= List of Maharajas of Mysore =

The following article lists the Maharajas of Mysore.

Maharajas of Mysore (1399–present)
Feudatory monarchy (As vassals of the Vijayanagara Empire) (1399–1553)
1	Yaduraya Wodeyar	(1399–1423)
2	Chamaraja Wodeyar I	(1423–1459)
3	Timmaraja Wodeyar I	(1459–1478)
4	Chamaraja Wodeyar II	(1478–1513)
5	Chamaraja Wodeyar III	(1513–1553)
Absolute monarchy (Independent Wodeyar rulers) (1553–1761)
6	Timmaraja Wodeyar II	(1553–1572)
7	Chamaraja Wodeyar IV	(1572–1576)
8	Chamaraja Wodeyar V	(1576–1578)
9	Raja Wodeyar I	(1578–1617)
10	Chamaraja Wodeyar VI	(1617–1637)
11	Raja Wodeyar II	(1637–1638)
12	Narasaraja Wodeyar I	(1638–1659)
13	Devaraja Wodeyar I	(1659–1673)
14	Devaraja Wodeyar II	(1673–1704)
15	Narasaraja Wodeyar II	(1704–1714)
16	Krishnaraja Wodeyar I	(1714–1732)
17	Chamaraja Wodeyar VII	(1732–1734)
18	Krishnaraja Wodeyar II	(1734–1761)
Puppet monarchy (Under the Sultanate of Hyder Ali and Tipu Sultan) (1761–1799)
(18)	Krishnaraja Wodeyar II	(1761–1766)
19	Nanjaraja Wodeyar	(1766–1770)
20	Chamaraja Wodeyar VIII	(1770–1776)
21	Chamaraja Wodeyar IX	(1776–1796)
Puppet monarchy (Under the British rule) (1799–1831)
22	Krishnaraja Wodeyar III	(1799–1831)
Titular monarchy Monarchy abolished under the Mysore Commission (1831–1881)
(22)	Krishnaraja Wodeyar III	(1831–1868)
23	Chamaraja Wadiyar X	(1868–1881)
Absolute monarchy Monarchy restored by Rendition Act 1881 (In subsidiary alliance with British Crown) (1881–1947)
(23)	Chamaraja Wadiyar X	(1881–1894)
24	Krishna Raja Wadiyar IV	(1894–1940)
25	Jayachamaraja Wadiyar	(1940–1947)
Constitutional monarchy (Mysore State, Dominion of India) (1947–1956)
(25)	Jayachamaraja Wadiyar (As Rajpramukh)	(1947–1956)
Titular monarchy (Monarchy abolished) (1956–1974)
(25)	Jayachamaraja Wadiyar	(1956–1974)
Head of the family (Titles abolished; Governors heading the state) (1974–present)
26	Srikantadatta Narasimharaja Wadiyar	(1974–2013)
27	Yaduveer Krishnadatta Chamaraja Wadiyar	(2015–present)

== See also ==
- List of Dewans of Mysore
- List of colonial governors and presidents of the Madras Presidency
- List of governors of Tamil Nadu
- List of governors of Karnataka
