= Chamaraja =

Chamaraja or Chamarajendra is the title of kings from the Wadiyar dynasty (or Wodeyar) of the former Kingdom of Mysore in southern India:

- Chamaraja Wodeyar I, Raja of Mysore (1408–1459; r. 1423–59)
- Chamaraja Wodeyar II, Raja of Mysore (1463–1513; r. 1478–1513)
- Chamaraja Wodeyar III, Raja of Mysore (1492–1553; r. 1513–53)
- Chamaraja Wodeyar IV, Raja of Mysore (1507–1576; r. 1572–76)
- Chamaraja Wodeyar V, Raja of Mysore (r. 1576–78)
- Chamaraja Wodeyar VI, Raja of Mysore (1608–1637; r. 1617–37)
- Chamaraja Wodeyar VII, Maharaja of Mysore (1704–1734; r. 1732–34)
- Chamaraja Wodeyar VIII, Maharaja of Mysore (1759–1776; r. 1770–76)
- Chamaraja Wodeyar IX, Maharaja of Mysore (1774–1796; r. 1776–96)
- Chamarajendra Wadiyar X, Maharaja of Mysore GCSI (1863–1894; r. 1868–94); m. Kempananjammanni Devi CI (1866–1934; Regent of Mysore: 30 December 1894 – 8 August 1902).
- Jayachamarajendra Wadiyar, Maharaja of Mysore GCB, GCSI (1919–1974; r. 1940–50); titular Maharaja and family head (1950–71); head of the Wadiyar family (1971–74)
- Yaduveer Krishnadatta Chamaraja Wadiyar (born 1992), titular Maharaja of Mysore and head of the Wadiyar family (2015–)

== Places ==
=== India ===
- Chamaraja (Vidhana Sabha constituency), a constituency in Karnataka Legislative Assembly named after Chamaraja Wodeyars of the Kingdom of Mysore
- Chamaraja Mohalla, a zone in Mysore named after Chamaraja Wodeyars of the Kingdom of Mysore

Named after Chamarajendra Wadiyar X

- Chamaraja Road, Mysore, a road in Mysore, Karnataka
- Chamaraja Road, Vadodara, a road in Vadodara, Gujarat
- Chamaraja Road, a road in Vijayawada, Andhra Pradesh
- Chamaraja Road, a road in Srinivaspur, Karnataka
- Chamarajendra Academy of Visual Arts, Mysore
- Chamarajendra reservoir, lake in Bengaluru, Karnataka

== See also ==
- Chamarajanagar, city in Karnataka, India
  - Chamarajanagar district
  - Chamarajanagar Assembly constituency, Karnataka Legislative Assembly
  - Chamarajanagar Lok Sabha constituency, Parliament of India
  - Chamarajanagar railway station
- Chamarajpet, suburb of Bengaluru, Karnataka, India
- Chamarajapuram, suburb of Mysore, Karnataka, India
  - Chamarajapuram railway station
