= List of Dewans of Mysore =

The following lists the dalvoys and dewans of Mysore from the 18th century to the 20th.

Prime Ministers of Mysore
No.	Portrait	Name	Tenure	Term	Maharaja
Dalvoys of Mysore Kingdom (1732–1782)
Under Chamaraja Wodeyar VII (1732–1734)
		Devarajaiya Urs	1732 - 1734		
Under Krishnaraja Wodeyar II (1734–1766)
		Devarajaiya Urs	1734 - 1761		
		Hyder Ali	1761 - 1766		
Under Nanjaraja Wodeyar (1766–1770)
		Hyder Ali	1766 - 1770		
Under Chamaraja Wodeyar VIII (1770–1776)
		Hyder Ali	1770 - 1776		
Under Chamaraja Wodeyar IX (1776–1782)
		Hyder Ali	1776 - 1782		
Dewans of Mysore Kingdom (1782–1949)
Under Chamaraja Wodeyar IX
1		Purnaiah	Dec 1782 - May 1799	1	
Under Krishnaraja Wadiyar III (1799–1881)
(1)		Purnaiah	May 1799 - Apr 1811	2	
2		Bargir Bakshi Balaji Rao	Apr 1811 - Jan 1812	1	
3		Savar Bakshi Rama Rao	Feb 1812 - Oct 1817	1	
4		Babu Rao	Nov 1817 - Apr 1818	1	
5		Siddharaj Urs	May 1818 - Feb 1820	1	
(4)		Babu Rao	Mar 1820 - Aug 1821	2	
6		Lingaraj Urs	Nov 1821 - Nov 1822	1	
(4)		Babu Rao	Dec 1822 - Nov 1825	3	
-		(None)	Nov 1825 - May 1827	-	
7		Venkata Urs	May 1827 - Oct 1831	1	
8		Venkataramanaiya	Oct 1831 - May 1832	1	
(4)		Babu Rao	May 1832 - Aug 1834	4	
9		Kollam Venkata Rao	Apr 1834 - 1838	1	
10		Surappaya	1838 - 1840	1	
(9)		Kollam Venkata Rao	1840 - 1844	2	
11		Kola Krishnama Naidu	1844 - 1858	1	
12		Kola Vijayarangam Naidu	1858 - 1864	1	
13		Arunachala Mudaliar	1864 - 1866	1	
		(None)	1866 - 1868	-	
Under British Crown (1881–1894)
		(None)	1868 - 20 Mar 1881	-	
Under Chamarajendra Wadiyar X (1881–1894)
14		C. V. Rungacharlu	Mar 1881 - Jan 1883	1	
15		K. Seshadri Iyer	Jan 1883 - Dec 1894	1	
Under Krishna Raja Wadiyar IV (1894–1940)
(15)		K. Seshadri Iyer	Dec 1894 - Aug 1900	(1)	
[15]		T. R. A. Thumboo Chetty(acting for Iyer)	Aug 1900 - Mar 1901	1	
16		P. N. Krishnamurti	Mar 1901 - Jun 1906	1	
17		V. P. Madhava Rao	Jun 1906 - Mar 1909	1	
18		T. Ananda Rao	Apr 1909 - Sep 1912	1	
19		M. Visvesvaraya	Nov 1912 - Dec 1918	1	
20		M. Kantaraj Urs	Dec 1918 - Feb 1922	1	
21		A. R. Banerjee	Mar 1922 - Apr 1926	1	
22		Mirza Ismail	May 1926 - Aug 1940	1	
Under Jayachamarajendra Wadiyar (1940-1950)
(22)		Mirza Ismail	Aug 1940 - 1941	(1)	
23		M. N. Krishna Rao	1941 - 1941	1	
24		N. Madhava Rao	1941 - 1946	1	
25		A. R. Mudaliar	1946 - 1949	1	
Chief Ministers of Karnataka
List of chief ministers of Karnataka

== See also ==
- List of Maharajas of Mysore
- List of chief ministers of Karnataka
- Prime Minister of Hyderabad
- List of Dewans of Travancore
