= Krishnaraja =

Krishnaraja may refer to:

- Krishnaraja (Vidhana Sabha constituency), a constituency in Karnataka, India
- Krishnaraja (Kalachuri dynasty), a 6th-century king of India
- Krishnaraja Wadiyar II, ruler of Mysore Kingdom of India
- Krishnaraja Wadiyar III, ruler of Mysore Kingdom of India
- Krishna Raja Wadiyar IV, ruler of Mysore Kingdom of India

== See also ==
- Krishna (disambiguation)
- Raja (disambiguation)
