= Mummadi =

Mummadi is the 3rd ordinal number or regnal number given to Kings and Queens in Kannada. Similarly there is Immadi(2nd) Nalvadi(4th). Regnal numbers are used to distinguish among persons with the same name who held the same office.

It is also a surname in the Telugu speaking states of Andhra Pradesh and Telangana.

A couple of the well-known personalities carrying the last name of "Mummadi" is Mummadi Krishnaraja Wodeyar and Krishnaraja Wodeyar III, member of the Wodeyar dynasty which ruled Mysore, known for his service to the Mysore state.
