= Chamaraja Wodeyar IX =

Maharaja of Mysore from 1776 to 1796

21st Maharaja of Mysore
- Reign: 27 September 1776 – 17 April 1796
- Coronation: 27 September 1776, Seringapatam
- Predecessor: Chamaraja Wodeyar VIII (older brother)
- Successor: Krishnaraja Wodeyar III (son)
- Born: 28 February 1774; Chamarajanagar
- Died: 17 April 1796 (aged 22); Royal Palace, Seringapatam
- Issue: Krishnaraja Wodeyar III
- House: Wodeyar
- Dynasty: Wodeyar dynasty
- Father: Krishnaraja Wadiyar II
- Mother: Honnajamma
- Religion: Hinduism

Chamaraja Wodeyar IX (28 February 1774 – 17 April 1796) was the twenty-first maharaja of the Kingdom of Mysore from 1776 for two decades until 1796.

== Life ==
Chamaraja Wodeyar IX was a son of Chikka Devaraj Urs of Arikuthara of the Karugahalli family. After the death of his older brother and predecessor Chamaraja Wodeyar VIII, he was adopted by Maharani Lakshmi Ammani Devi, widow of Maharaja Krishnaraja Wodeyar II. He reigned under the controls of Sarvadhikari Hyder Ali and his son Tipu Sultan, like his three immediate predecessors did: Maharajas Krishanaraja Wodeyar II, Nanjaraja Wodeyar, and Chamaraja Wodeyar VIII.

In January 1786, Tipu Sultan seized total power, established the new state of Khudadad, and assumed the title of Padshah.

The maharaja died of smallpox at the Royal Palace of Seringapatam on 17 April 1796.

== Family ==
Chamaraja Wodeyar IX married Maharani Kempa Nanjammani Vani Vilasa Sannidhana and they had a daughter named Jayalakshmi Ammani.
