= Urs (surname) =

Urs (Kannada: ಅರಸು) pronounced as "Arasu", is a surname used by the community associated to the royal family of Mysore Wodeyars based in Mysore in Karnataka, India. The word is derived from Arasu or Arasa which is used to designate royalty or ruler and meant ruler in Kannada.They are part of the Kshatriya caste.They claim various religious and sectarian affiliations like Shaivism, Vaishnavism, or Jainism according to their clan and lineage. They are directly related to the wodeyars or are related to distant Vijayanagar rulers or noble families from Hampi. The community consisted of landowners,court officials,rich merchants. The Arasu community is classified as a OBC by the Government of Karnataka.

The Arasu caste, Arasu or Urs are kshatriyas,they belong to Kannada Dravidian lineage. Kannada is their mother tongue. Even though some of them follow Shaivism, Vaishnavism, and Jainism; they wear Janivara after Upanayana in childhood. These practices don't hinder their marriages. However, the Vedic method is generally followed in marriage. There is a tradition of keeping a sword or a knife with the groom. Dashara is a big festival for them, during which Kali, Lakshmi and Saraswati are worshiped

== History ==
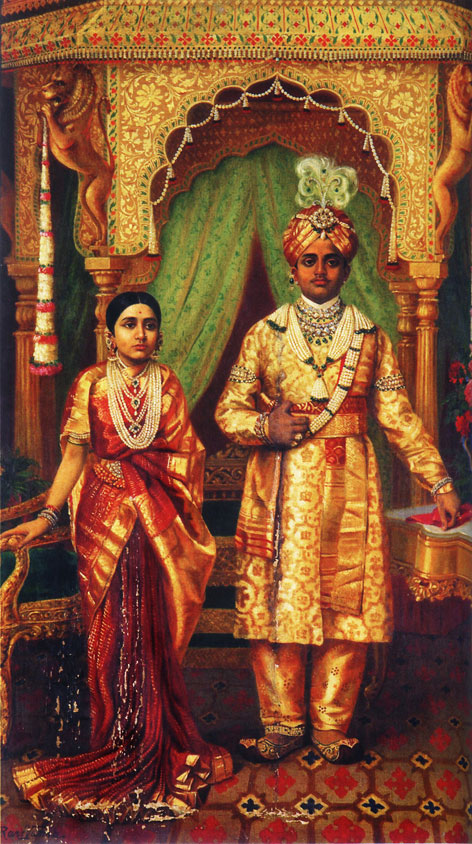
Urs wedding dress

Mysore's erstwhile rulers were the Wadiyars, known for their administrative skills, vision and social justice. They had a close attachment with the Urs community. Men in this community were commonly named as Chamaraja Urs, Nanjaraj Urs, Devaraj Urs, Srikanta Raje Urs etc. and women were most commonly named as Devajammani, Jayalaxammani, Chelvajammani etc. '.

=== Legend ===
The original name of erstwhile Mysore region was Puragere, coming under the purview of Hadinaadu, meaning Hadimooru (13) naadu (villages). The fiefdom coming under Vijayanagar Empire was ruled by Chamaraja. The term Urs (Arasu) means ruler. Such rulers, having hold over smaller regions around Hadinaadu ruled by Chamaraja, had close ties with him and his clan. Chamaraja's queen Chikkadevarasammanni had a daughter, the beautiful Devajammanni. Chamaraja had an untimely death. Taking advantage of this, Mara Naika, chieftain of neighbouring Karagahalli, attempted to conquer Hadinaadu. Instead of waging a war, Mara Naika planned to marry young Devajammanni, to gain control over her father's province. When his repeated attempts to woo the princess were resisted by her, he threatened to abduct her and marry forcibly.

Folklore says that at that time, Yaduraya and his brother Krishnaraya travelled from Dwaraka to Vijayanagar, Melukote and other places as pilgrims. One night, Goddess Chamundeshwari appeared in the dreams of Yaduraya, directing him to go to Hadinaadu. That was the time when Devajammanni was being pestered by Mara Naika. Yaduraya, along with his brother, reached Hadinaadu and halted at Kodi Bhairaveshwara temple. They learned about the plight of Hadinaadu, their friendly state. They met the queen-mother and gave her assurance of solving her problem. The brothers then sent a message to Mara Naika that Devajammanni had agreed to marry him. The wedding procession, in all jubilation, proceeded from Karagahalli to Hadinaadu. Yaduraya and Krishnaraya, guised as ordinary people, managed to join the wedding procession. Yaduraya stealthily reached the tent where Mara Naika camped and killed him. He then directed his brother Krishnaraya to lay siege to Karagahalli and capture it. Thus, Hadinaadu's rulers and subjects heaved a sigh of relief. The queen, grateful to Yaduraya, gave her daughter's hand in marriage to him. He was crowned as the ruler of Hadinaadu on May 11, 1399, after which a new empire was established in the region. Yaduraya became the founder of the Mysore Wadiyar dynasty. He ruled the province till 1423.

Noted historian Prof. P. V. Nanjaraj Urs however argues that Yaduraya and Krishnaraya were not from Dwaraka, as is the belief among some, but had come from Vijayanagar or some other region around the then Mysore province. Having heard of their valour, Chikkadevarasammanni invited them to the Palace to slay Mara Naika, he says. Historians like Shyam Prasad, Nobuhiro Ota, David Leeming, Aya Ikegame suggest that the Wodiyars were local feudal lords who adopted puranic legend to claim themselves as direct descendants of legendary Lunar Dynasty.

=== Origins ===
Yaduraya was succeeded by senior Bettada Chamaraja Wadiyar (1423–1459), Thimmaraja Wadiyar (1459–1478) and senior Chamaraja Urs Wadiyar (1478–1513). Fifth Bettada Chamaraja Wadiyar entrusted to his three sons parts of his empire namely Hemmanahalli, Haravu and Puragere (present Mysore region). He also passed an order that marriages of their lineage must be held among the relatives of the three families only and in case there were no issues in a family, they must adopt a child from the other two families. The three sons', their wives' and their relatives' families led to the growth of Ursu community.

The Hadinaadu Empire, restricted to 33 villages during the Yaduraya era, over the years was expanded. The headquarters of Hadinaadu was then Puragere. Its ruler Bettada Chamaraja Wadiyar's son changed the name of Puragere to Mahishasurana Ooru, which later became shortened to Mysooru. The successive rulers, having political ambitions, had more than one wife. During their military campaigns when the enemy ruler was certain of a defeat, married off the daughter to the Maharaja as a token of friendship. As such, they had more than one wife, who went on joining the Ursu community. Ranadheera Kanteerava Wadiyar had 10 wives. Except the queen, rest of the wives and their relatives became members of the Ursu community. From Yaduraya to Jaya Chamaraja Wadiyar, the dynasty had 25 rulers.

=== Recent History ===
About a century ago, following on order from the Maharaja to conduct a census of the Ursu community, a committee led by Gopala Krishne Urs reported that there were 5,000 Ursu community members. Now, there may be at least 40,000. In the Khas Durbar conducted by Srikanta Datta Narasimharaja Wadiyar in the Palace, members of Ursu community attend in royal robes.

== Culture ==
Owing to their broader outlook and modern administrative reforms, it is being alleged that Ursu community's culture and traditions are getting diluted and disintegrated. However, it is not so. On the contrary, members of Ursu community are strictly following their ancient customs and traditions. Long coat, Zari valli (zari embroidered shawl) and zari peta (embroidered turban) are compulsory for the Ursu groom and wearing only gold ornaments is compulsory for the bride.

== Demographics ==
They mostly reside in Mysuru, Chamarajanagar and Bengaluru districts and though a minority in population, there are several achievers in political, literature and social fields. The children of queen mother (pattada rani) were considered eligible to be crowned and were called Ursu. Children of their queens were never to be crowned as rulers. They were called as Bangarada Ursu. Even today, Ursu community is segregated under Thet Ursu and Bangarada Ursu.

== See also ==
- Arasu (2007 film), a Kannada film whose protagonist bears the name Shivaraj Arasu
