= Chamaraja Wodeyar I =

Raja of Mysore from 1423 to 1459

2nd Raja of Mysore
- Reign: 18 July 1423 – January 1459
- Predecessor: Yaduraya Wodeyar (father)
- Successor: Timmaraja Wodeyar I (son)
- Born: 22 November 1408
- Died: January 1459 (aged 50); Puragiri, Mysore
- Issue: Timmaraja Wodeyar I
- House: Wodeyar
- Father: Yaduraya Wodeyar

Chamaraja Wodeyar I (Bettada Chamaraja; 22 November 1408 – January 1459) was the second raja of the Kingdom of Mysore from 1423 at the age of 24, after his father's death, until his own in 1459. He was the elder son of Yaduraya.

== Inheritance and expansion ==
He inherited a crown for which recognition and respect was growing. However, his realm had taken the form of a principality and a young kingdom. Further, Mysore Kingdom was a subordinate power to the Vijayanagara Empire and would not survive without aids and grants from the high command. When he ascended the throne, the Vijayanagara Empire, although prosperous and a militarily power, was in a political crisis, with successive and frequent assassinations of the Sangama emperors. His father faced similar problems, and their own power was called into question. In spite of political uncertainty, Mysore saw slow but steady expansion by accession of unincorporated villages and towns in and around Mysore, during both Yaduraya and Chamaraja Wodeyar's reigns.

Soon after Chamaraja Wodeyar I took power, Vijaya Bukka Raya died. However, his successor, Deva Raya II, proved to be an able politician and an administrator. Deva Raya, with Chamaraja Wodeyar I in Mysore, became a dominant ruler in his time in India, a noted ruler of the Sangama dynasty. Hence, Deva Raya II's reign, and transitively Chamaraja Wodeyar I's formed the golden era of South India under the Vijayanagara Empire.

Chamaraja Wodeyar took village-level organisations and other governing bodies beyond his domain under his control, without resorting to military action, thereby diplomatically accessing remote, uninhabited places and those with settlements. He is noted for containing the contempt of the remnant Dalvoys for the Vijayanagara Empire and the new Kingdom of Mysore.

== Death ==
Chamaraja Wodeyar I died in 1459. He ruled under three emperors, Vijaya Bukka Raya, Deva Raya II (for the most part of his rule), and under Mallikarjuna Raya for nearly a decade. His father's reign spanned 24 years while his own lasted 36, Mysore came to be recognised as Vijayanagara Empire's prodigy and a potential successor in case of the Empire's disintegration, which, in the course of a century and a half, took place. The focus began to shift on Mysore because a royal-family-feud in Vijayanagara, interim emperors, and other incompetent subordinate rulers parallel to the Mysore rajas. However, after Deva Raya II's ascension, both Vijayanagara and Mysore began to flourish.

== See also ==
- Yaduraya
- Deva Raya II
- Wodeyar dynasty
- Maharaja of Mysore
- Kingdom of Mysore
- Vijayanagara Empire
