= Chamaraja Wodeyar VIII =

Maharaja of Mysore from 1770 to 1776

20th Maharaja of Mysore
- Reign: 2 August 1770 – 6 September 1776
- Coronation: Seringapatam, 16 August 1770
- Predecessor: Nanjaraja Wodeyar (eldest brother)
- Successor: Chamaraja Wodeyar IX (youngest brother)
- Born: 27 August 1759
- Died: 6 September 1776 (aged 17); Royal Palace, Seringapatam
- House: Wodeyar
- Dynasty: Wodeyar dynasty
- Father: Krishnaraja Wodeyar II
- Mother: Devaja Ammani Avaru
- Religion: Hinduism

Chamaraja Wodeyar VIII (Bettada Chamaraja Wodeyar VIII Bahadur; 27 August 1759 – 6 September 1776.) was the twentieth maharaja of the Kingdom of Mysore from 1770 for six years until 1776. He reigned under the powerful control of Sarvadhikari Hyder Ali.

== Life ==
He was the second son of Krishnaraja Wodeyar II and succeeded on the death of his elder brother Nanjaraja Wodeyar on 2 August 1770.

== See also ==
- Wodeyar dynasty
