= Krishnaraja Wadiyar II =

Maharaja of Mysore from 1734 to 1766

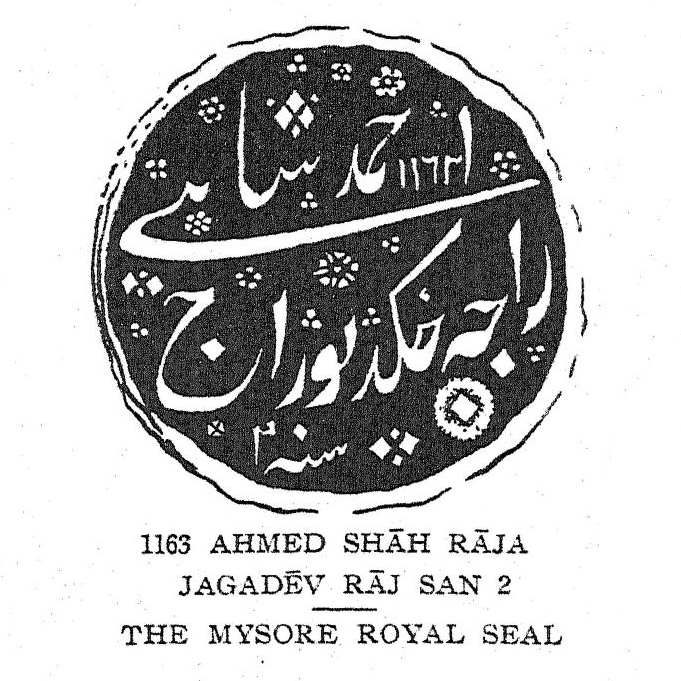
- Seal of Krishnaraja Wodeyar II

18th Maharaja of Mysore
- Reign: 10 June 1734 – 25 April 1766
- Coronation: 15 June 1735
- Predecessor: Chamaraja Wodeyar VII (brother)
- Successor: Nanjaraja Wodeyar (eldest son); Hyder Ali (dispute)
- Born: 1728
- Died: 25 April 1766 (aged 37–38); Seringapatam
- Spouse: Devaja Ammani Avaru, Putaja Ammani Avaru, Lakshmi Ammani Devi Avaru
- Issue: Nanjaraja Wodeyar, Chamaraja Wodeyar VIII, Chamaraja Wodeyar IX
- House: Wadiyar
- Father: Chame Urs; Dodda Krishnaraja I (adoptive father)
- Mother: Devajammani (Adoptive mother)
- Religion: Hinduism

Krishnaraja Wadiyar II (1728 – 25 April 1766), was the eighteenth maharaja of the Kingdom of Mysore from 1734 to 1766. He ruled as monarch during his entire rule, first under the dalvoys, and then, for the last five years, under Hyder Ali.

== Life ==
On 8 October 1731, Krishnaraja Wadiyar II was adopted by Maharani Devajammani and Maharaja Krishnaraja Wodeyar I under the title Cikka Krishnaraja Wodyar.

He was crowned at Mysore on 15 June 1735. He reigned under the control of dalvoy Devarajaiya Urs, who was in charge of Mysore from 1724 to 1746. After the decline of the Devarajaiya's power and eventual death, Hyder Ali, another dalvoy, succeeded as the de facto ruler of Mysore from 1761 until his death in 1782.

Krishnaraja Wadiyar had very little power as there was a tripartite struggle between himself, Hyder Ali, and sarvadhikari Nanja Raja. In fact, the kingdom became weak because of the struggle. Hyder Ali gradually filled the place of Nanja Raja. The king executed many plots to regain his power but was not successful.

Krishna Raja Wadiyar II died at Seringapatam on 25 April 1766.
