= Yaduraya Wodeyar =

Raja of Mysore from 1399 to 1423

Raja of Mysore
- Reign: 11 April 1399 – October 1423
- Predecessor: Position established
- Successor: Chamaraja Wodeyar I (son)
- Born: 20 January 1371; Srirangapatna, Vijayanagara Empire
- Died: October 1423 (aged 52); Puragiri, Mysore
- Issue: Chamaraja Wodeyar I
- House: Wodeyar

Vijaya Raja Wodeyar (Adi Yaduraya; 20 January 1371 – October 1423), also known as Yaduraya Wodeyar, was the first raja of Mysore from 1399 until his death in October 1423. The Vijayanagara emperor Harihara II installed Yaduraya as his vassal and as a dedicated ruler of Mysore principality in 1399 to suppress the opposition of the Dalavays. The Dalavays were a decommissioned clan of royal fighters, advisers, and ministers who were active in the Vijayanagara Empire before, during, and after Harihara II and Yaduraya.
