= Wadiyar dynasty =

Kingdom of Mysore royal family, 1399–1950

House of Wadiyar

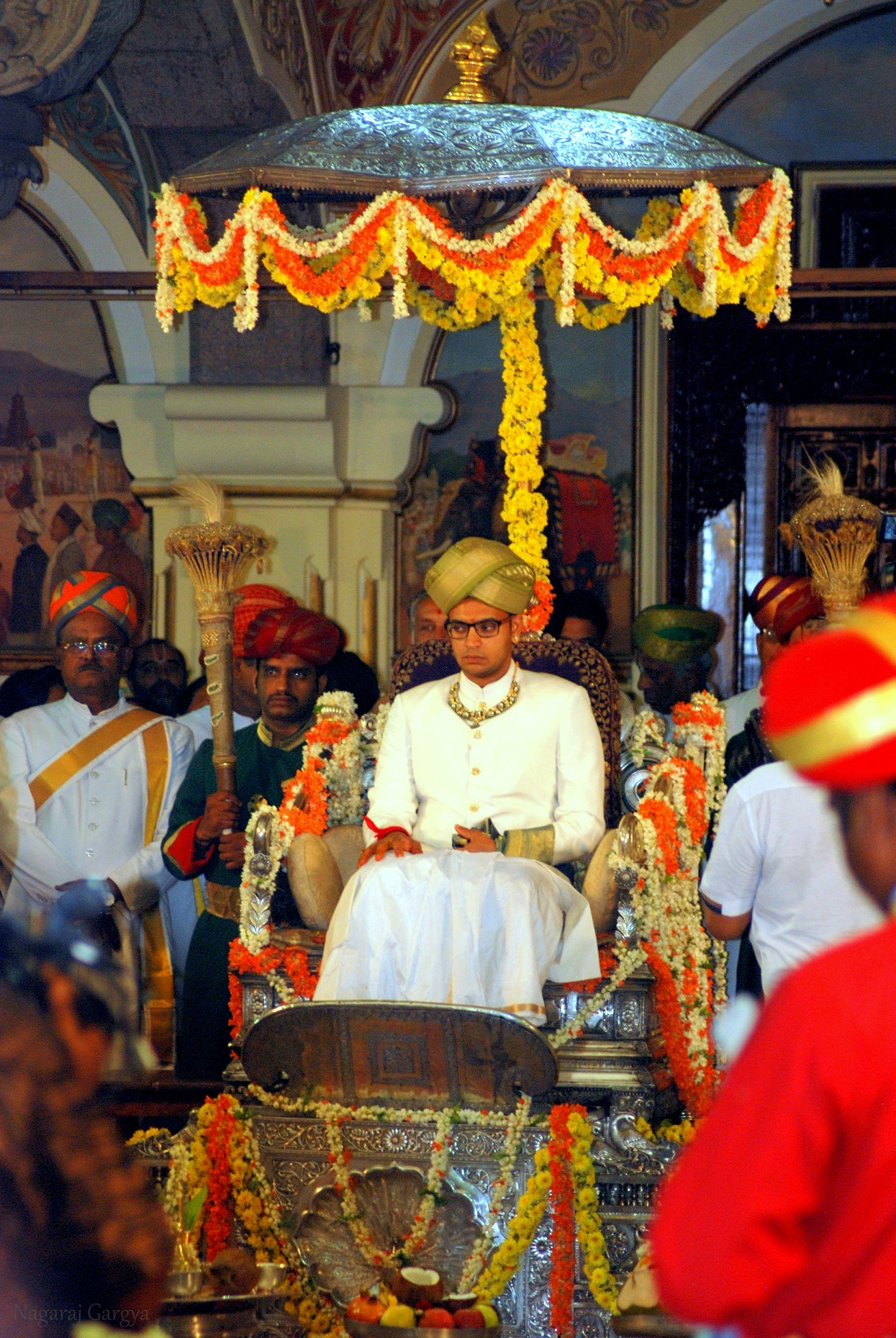
- Yaduveer Krishnadatta Chamaraja Wadiyar, the present head of the family
- Country: Kingdom of Mysore
- Founded: 11 April 1399; 627 years ago
- Founder: Yaduraya Wodeyar
- Current head: Yaduveer Krishnadatta Chamaraja Wadiyar
- Final ruler: Jayachamaraja Wodeyar
- Titles: Maharaja of Mysore
- Website: www.ykcwadiyar.in

The Wadiyar dynasty (Kannada: [(ʷ)oɖejɐru]), also referred to as the Wadiyars of Mysore (also spelt Wodeyar/Odeyar), is a late-medieval Indian royal family of former maharajas of Mysore from the Urs clan originally based in Mysore city. They assumed the title ‘Wodeyar,’ which means ‘Lord’ in Kannada.

As Maharajas of Mysore, the Wadiyars ruled the Kingdom of Mysore from the late 1300s until 1950. Members of the Wadiyar dynasty and the Urs clan have also been royal advisers as dewans to their reigning siblings, cousins, nephews, or distant relatives. Some members have also commanded army divisions as dalvoys (commander-in-chief) for their reigning monarch.

During the late 14th century, the family was originally poleygars (Kannada for garrison) defending the regions in and around Mysore town for the Vijayanagara Empire, their feudal overlords. With the fall and decline of the empire in the 16th century, the Wadiyars declared independence when Timmaraja Wodeyar II seized the nearby town of Srirangapattana, the seat of Tirumala, Sriranga II's viceroy, in 1610. Between 1766 and 1799, when Hyder Ali and Tipu dictated the kingdom, the Wadiyar rulers as maharajas were largely nominal without any actual powers. After Tipu's execution in 1799, the East India Company which governed large territories in India at that time restored the kingdom back to the Wadiyars under a subsidiary alliance. After India's independence from the Crown, the ruling Maharaja Jayachamaraja Wadiyar ceded the kingdom to the newly formed Dominion of India.

== Name ==
In Kannada, the common noun odeyaru (Kannada: ಒಡೆಯರು oḍeyaru) is the plural form of odeya (ಒಡೆಯ) which means lord or lordship. The first poleygar and raja of Mysore, Yaduraya, assumed the term as his titular proper noun.

Members of the Wadiyar dynasty hail from the Urs clan; upon adoption or by heredity, they assume the title Wadiyar and their immediate family therewith, the latest instance of its happening with the present head of the family Yaduveer Wadiyar upon his coronation in 2015.

== History ==
The Wadiyars claim descent from the Hindu deity Krishna. Legend has it that they arrived from Dvārakā. However, historians like P. V. Nanjaraj Urs, Shyam Prasad, Nobuhiro Ota, David Leeming, and Aya Ikegame instead suggest that the Wadiyars were local feudal lords who purported Puranic ancestry and claimed to be the direct descendants of the Lunar Dynasty.

=== Vassal fiefdom ===
The Wadiyar dynasty started when Yaduraya, a garrison leader (poleygar), was made the prefect of Mysore and the surrounding regions by his overlord Harihara II of the Vijayanagara Empire in 1399. With this, Yaduraya assumed the title Raja and the honorary surname Wadiyar. He and his successors ruled the fiefdom of Mysore as rajas under the vassalage of the Vijayanagara Empire until around 1553.

=== Independent kingdom ===
The Vijayanagara Empire disintegrated in 1565. With the fall of the empire, Mysore became an independent kingdom, the first independent king being Timmaraja Wodeyar II, the great-great-great-grandson of the founding ruler Yaduraya. Thimmaraja's nephew Raja Wodeyar I expanded the borders of the kingdom. In 1610, he moved the capital from Mysore to nearby island town of Srirangapattana on the river Kaveri, which provided strategic protection against military attacks. Raja Wadiya's cousin and successor down the line Kanthirava Narasaraja I expanded the frontiers of the kingdom to Trichy in present-day Tamil Nadu. The kingdom reached its peak under Kanthirava's grand-nephew Devaraja Wodeyar II, who reformed the administration of the kingdom by dividing it into 18 departments (called chavadis); he also introduced a coherent system of taxation.

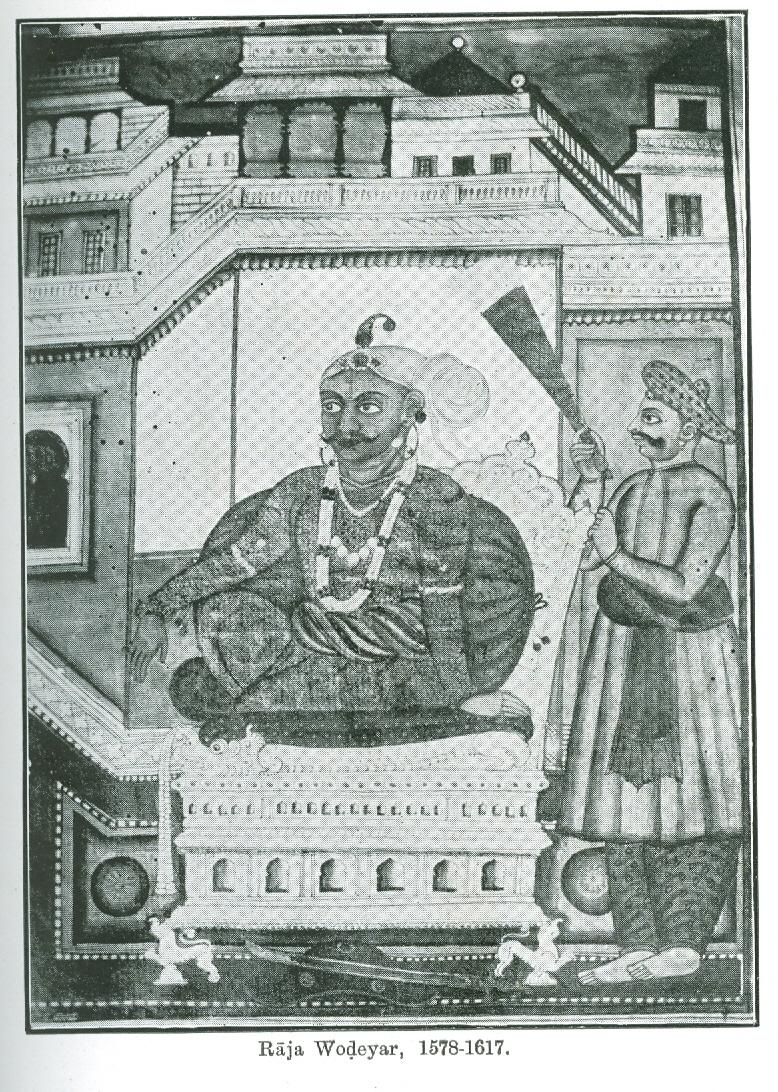
Maharaja Raja Wadiyar who started Mysore Dasara

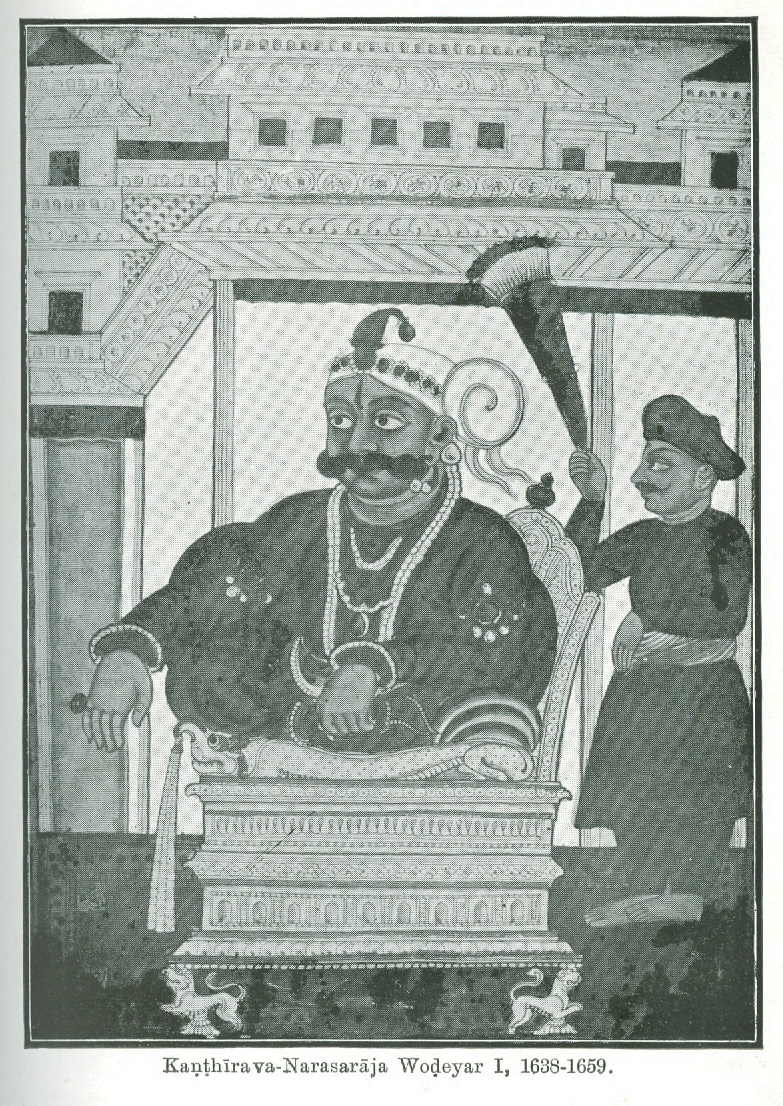
Maharaja Kanthirava Narasaraja I was referred to ranadheera (valiant on the battlefield)

=== During Hyder Ali and Tipu ===
From 1760 to 1799, the rule of the Wadiyar dynasty was essentially nominal, with real power firmly in the hands of the Commander-in-chief and later self-proclaimed sultan, Hyder Ali, and his son and successor Tipu. The two, ruling the sultanate from Srirangapattana, expanded the kingdom aggressively.

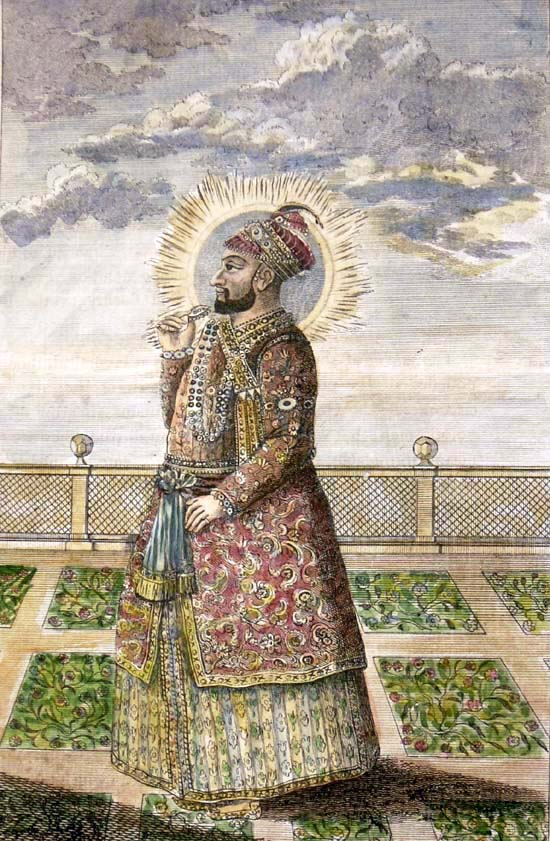
Hyder Ali, the commander-in-chief who usurped power

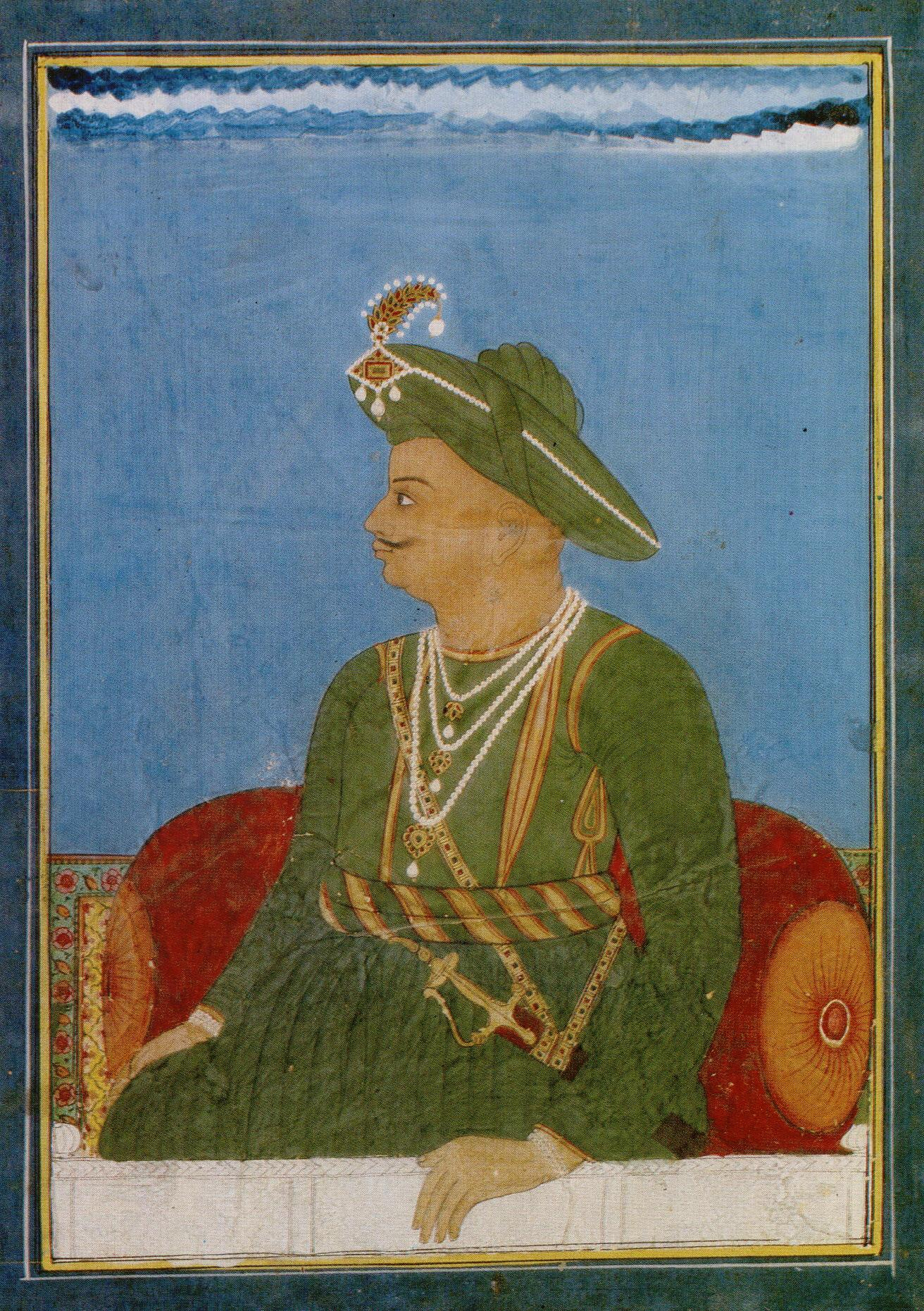
Ali's son Tipu, the Sultan of Mysore

The Kingdom of Mysore under Tipu

=== Independent kingdom in a subsidiary alliance ===
After Tipu's defeat in the Siege of Srirangapattana during the Fourth Anglo-Mysore War in 1799, the British restored the Kingdom to the Wadiyars under a subsidiary alliance that required an annual payment as tribute. The capital was moved back to Mysore. The four-year-old infant prince Krishnaraja Wodeyar III, adopted son of the previous ruler Chamaraja Wadiyar IX, was anointed as the Maharaja of Mysore.

In 1831, on a specious plea of non-payment by Krishnaraja Wodeyar III, the kingdom was placed under Mysore Commission that lasted from 1831 to 1881. Mark Cubbon and L. B. Bowring were among the well-known commissioners of the period.

In 1868, upon Krishnaraja Wodeyar III's demise, his five-year-old grandson Chamaraja Wadiyar X became the heir to the throne. When in 1881 he attained the age of majority, through an act of parliament, the British once again transferred power back to the Wadiyars. The maharaja changed the English spelling of their royal name from Wodeyar to Wadiyar. He established the Mysore Representative Assembly; the first of its kind in Princely India.

Chamaraja Wadiyar X's son and successor Krishnaraja Wadiyar IV earned great fame as a saintly king, and his kingdom was hailed as Ramarajya by Mahatma Gandhi–as an ideal kingdom comparable to the one ruled by Lord Rama.

Krishnaraja Wadiyar IV's nephew, successor, and the last reigning king of the Wadiyar dynasty, Jayachamarajendra Wadiyar, ruled from 1940 until 1950. Upon India's independence from the British crown in 1947, Jayachamarajendra Wadiyar ceded his kingdom to the new provisional Dominion of India but continued as Maharajah until India became a Republic in 1950.

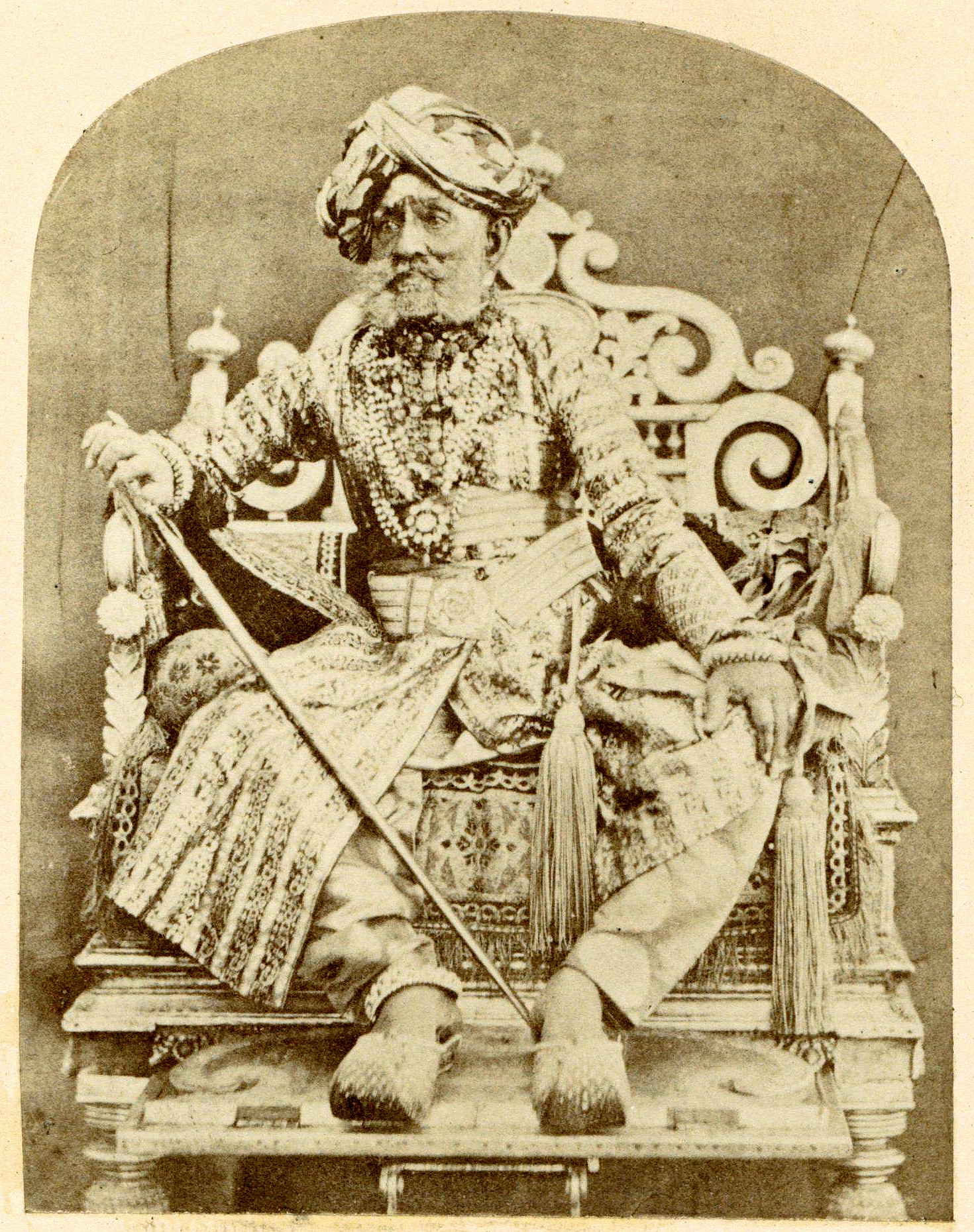
Maharaja Krishnaraja Wadiyar III during his latter years

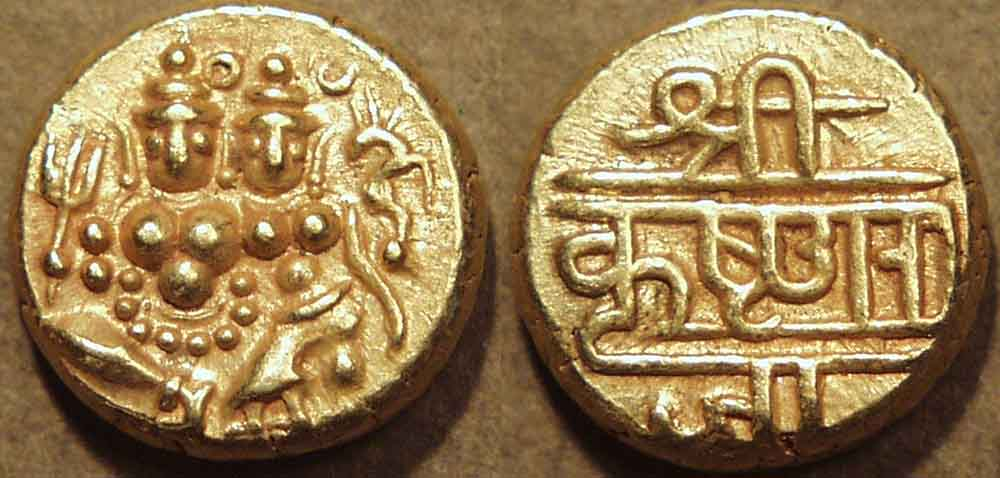
Golded coins during Krishnaraja Wadiyar III depicting Shiva holding his attributes of a trident and a deer, with his consort Parvati seated on his lap. The obverse reads: Sri Krishnaraja in Sanskrit

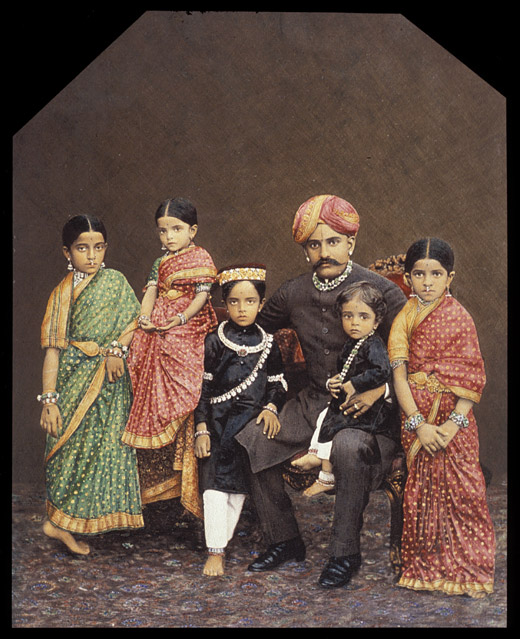
Maharaja Chamaraja Wadiyar X with his children

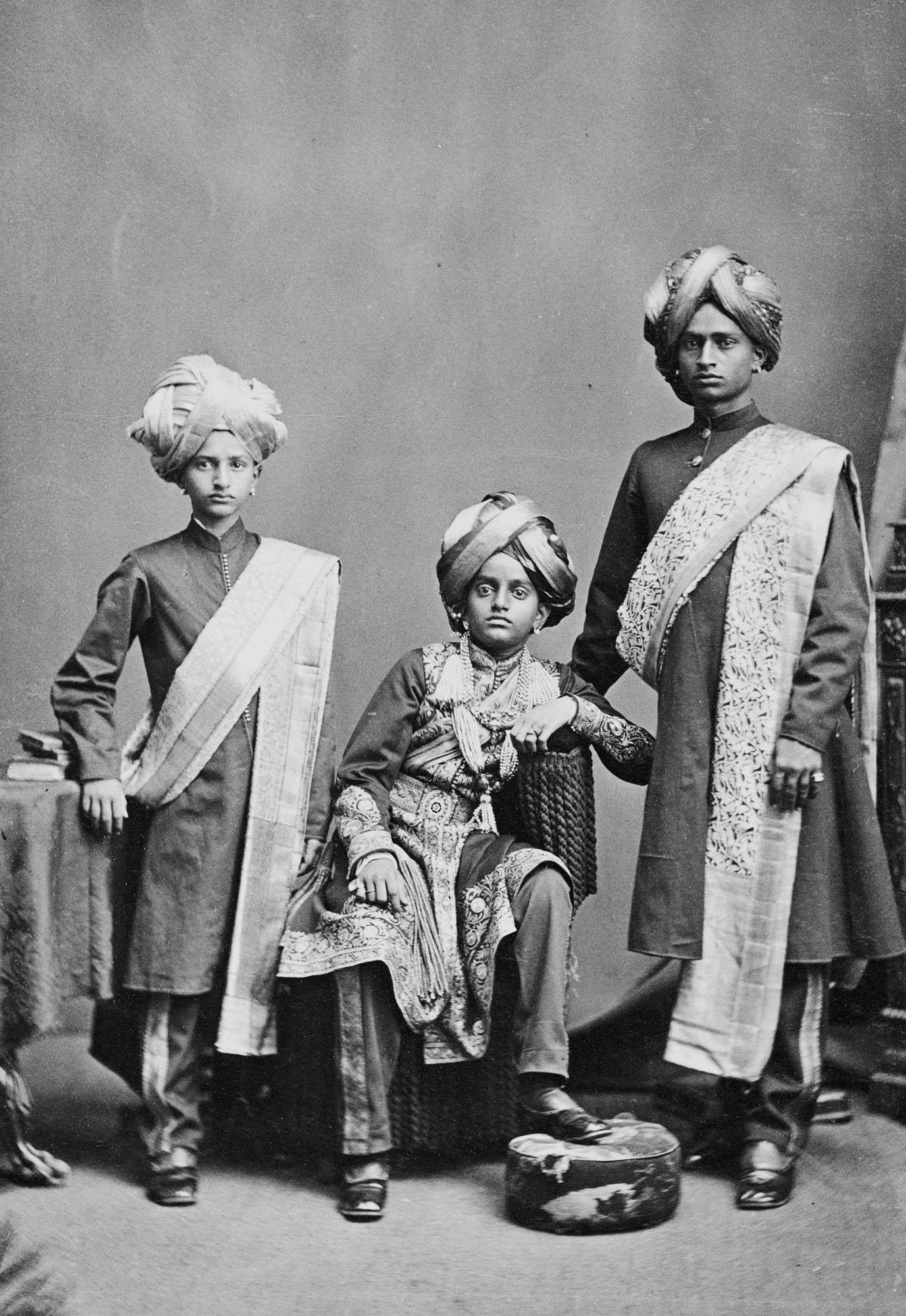
Crown prince Yuvaraja Krishnaraja Wadiyar IV with two other Indian princes

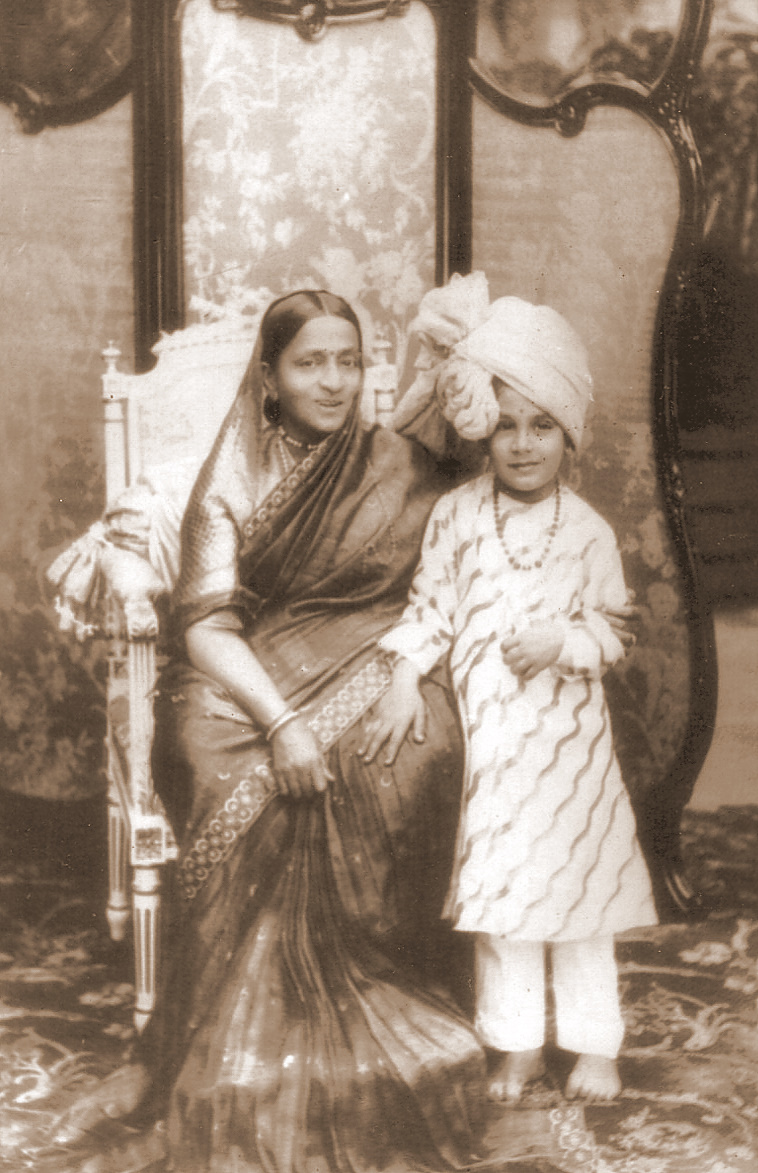
Rajamate Kempananjammanni Devi with grandson and future king Jayachamarajendra Wadiyar

=== Dissolution of the kingdom ===
Jayachamarajendra Wadiyar became the rajapramukh of the renamed Mysore State from 1950 to 1956. After the reorganisation of Indian states on a linguistic basis in 1956, he was appointed Governor of the integrated Mysore State (present Karnataka State), a post which he held until 1964. He was then appointed Governor of Madras (now Tamil Nadu) for two years.

The Indian Constitution continued to recognise him as the Maharajah of Mysore until 1971, when titles and privy purses of maharajas were abolished by the Government of India under Indira Gandhi. The maharajah died in 1974.

His only son Srikantadatta Narasimharaja Wadiyar became the head of the family; he was a member of the Indian Parliament.

Upon Srikantadatta Wadiyar's demise 2013, his widowed wife Devi Pramoda Wadiyar adopted Yaduveer Wadiyar, who was anointed as the maharaja of Mysore and the head of the family in 2015.

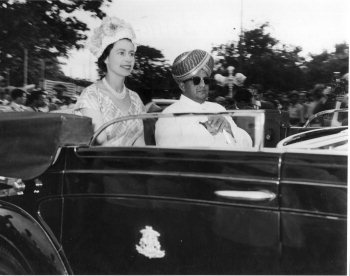
Jayachamaraja Wadiyar with Elizabeth II

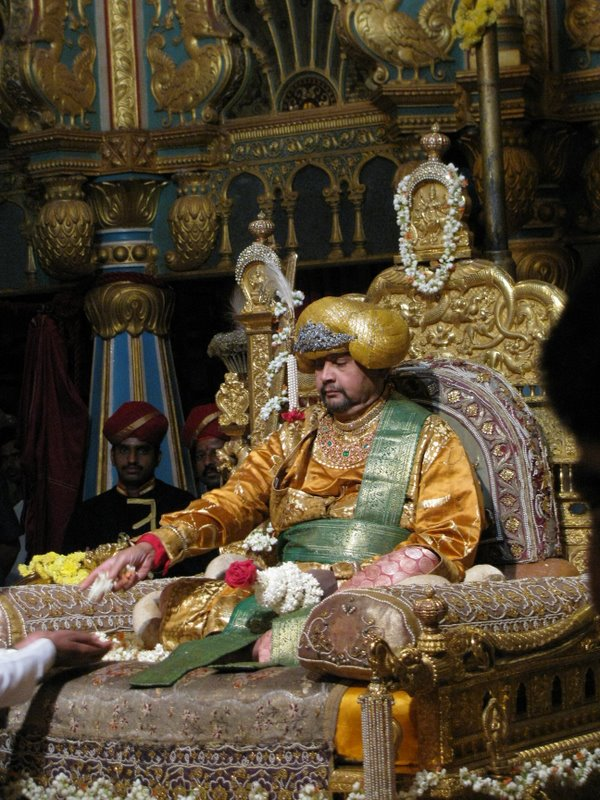
Srikantadatta Wadiyar holding a private durbar during a Dasara festival

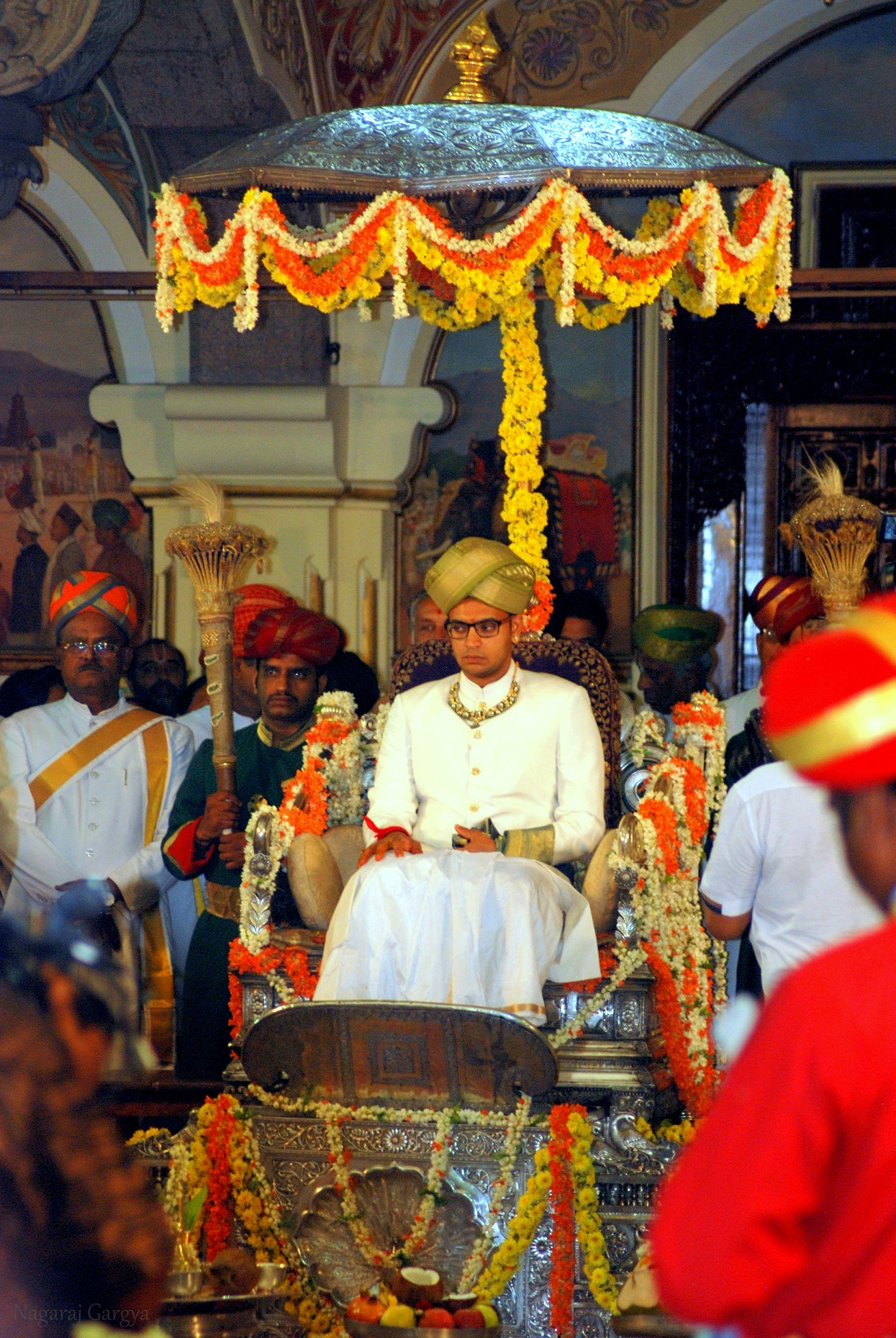
Yaduveer Wadiyar, the present head of the Wadiyar dynasty

== Residences ==
Mysore Palace has been the official residence of the Wadiyars for most of the family's recorded history. Briefly, Srirangapattana was also the seat of the Wadiyars. By the early 1900s, Bangalore had seen significant infrastructural development and had become a secondary residence for the Wadiyars at the Bangalore Palace.

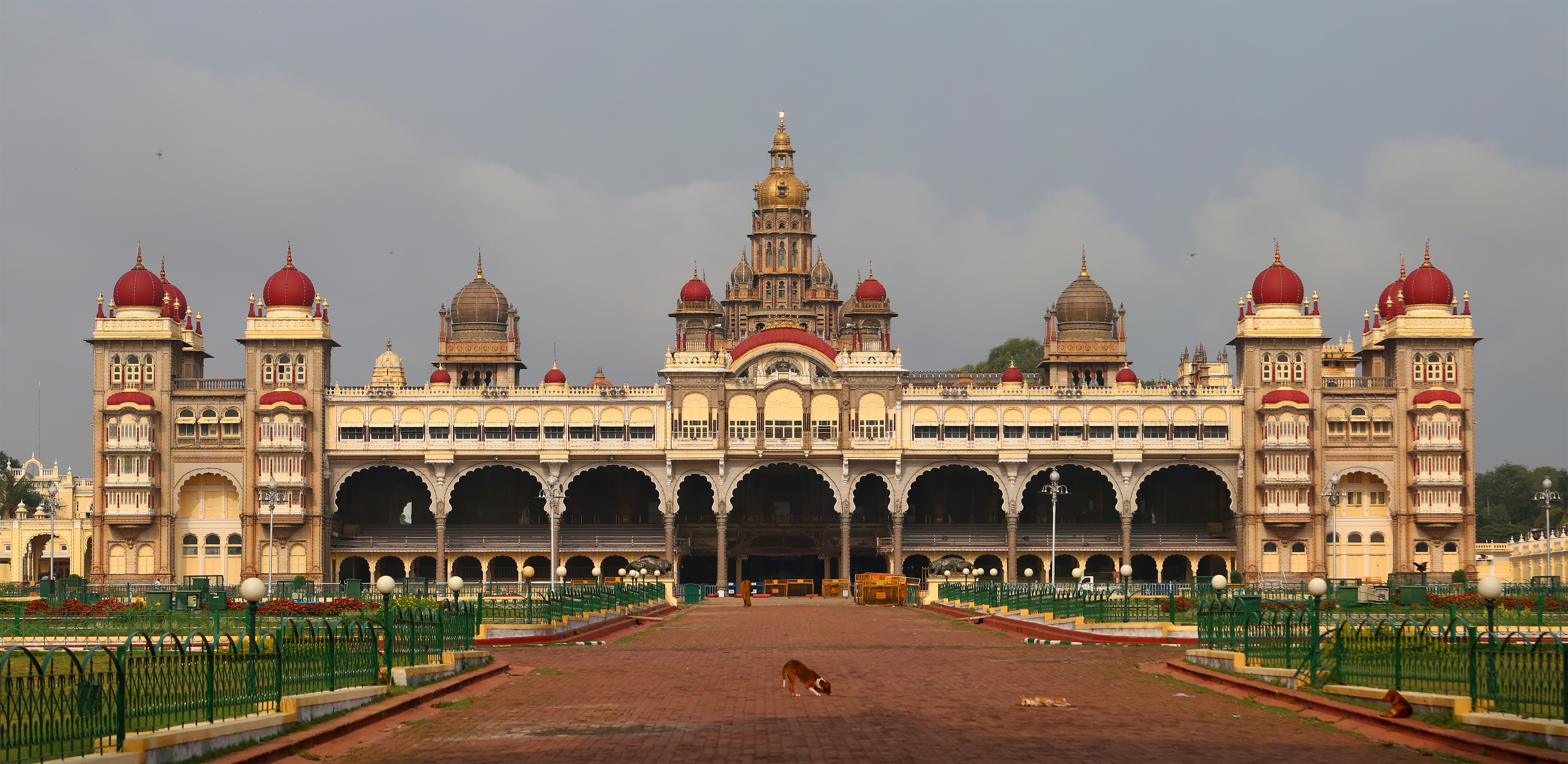
Mysore Palace is the traditional seat of the Wadiyars in Mysuru

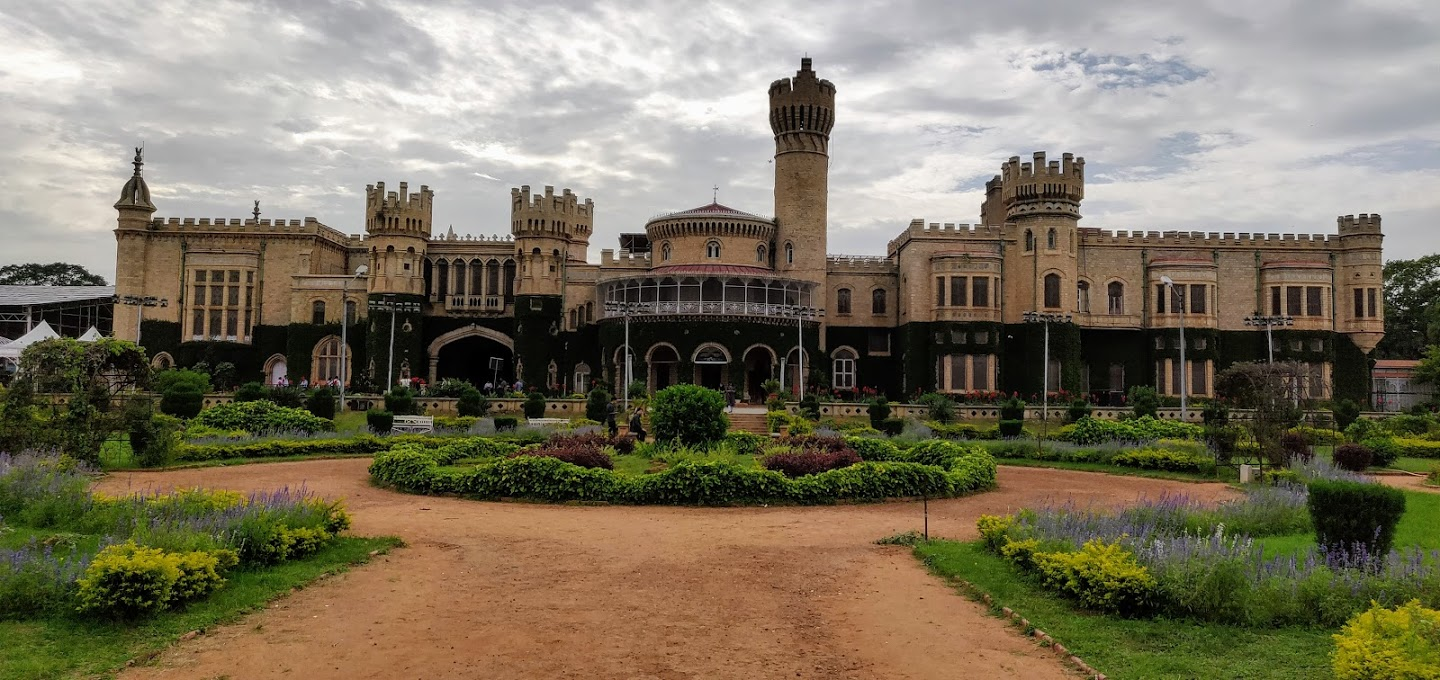
Bengaluru Palace, the Wadiyars' residence in Bengaluru

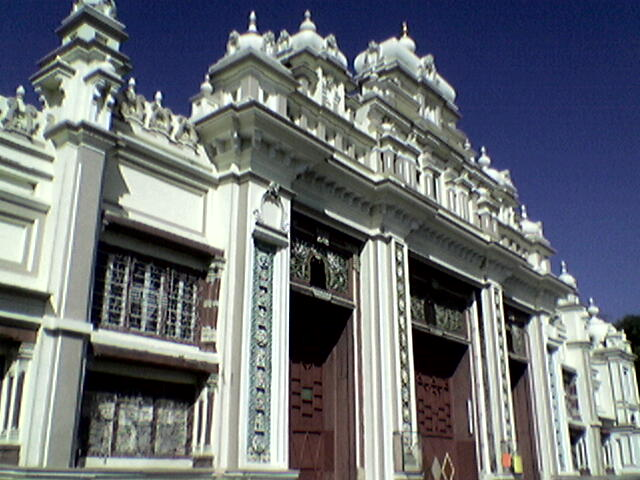
Jaganmohan Palace served as a temporary residence in the early 1900s when the old Mysore Palace burnt down

== Alamelamma's Curse ==
With a declining Vijayanagara Empire, in 1610 Raja Wadiyar conquered the fort of Srirangapattana from Tirumala, the Vijayanagara viceroy stationed there. Tirumala is said to have retired to the nearby town of Talakadu with his two wives. At about the same time, Tirumala suffered from a terminal disease; his condition deteriorated and he eventually died.

One of his wives was Alamelamma, a staunch devotee of Ranganayaki, the consort of Lord Ranganatha, the presiding deity of the famous Adi-Ranga temple in the island fortress of Srirangapatna. Alamelamma had a large amount of jewellery, including a fine nose ring studded with a large pearl. As a widow, customs forbade jewellery on her. She frequently lent the jewels to the temple of Ranganayaki. Every Tuesdays and Fridays, Ranaganayaki's idol would be decorated with the jewellery, returned to Alamelamma's safe custody for rest of the week.

On one instance, the temple requested the king's soldiers to fetch the jewels from Alamelamma as has become a practice. An approaching king's emissaries, headed by Chief Courtier Ramanath Molahalli, seems to have scared her off. To escape an ill-presumed imminent wrath of the king, she ran over to a cliff overlooking the Kaveri river into the whirlpool and cursed before plunging to her own death, "may Talakadu become a barren expanse of land, Malangi turn into a whirlpool, and may kings of Mysore never beget children to all eternity" (Kannada: ತಲಕಾಡು ಮರಳಾಗಲಿ, ಮಾಲಂಗಿ ಮಡುವಾಗಲಿ, ಮೈಸೂರು ದೊರೆಗಳಿಗೆ ಮಕ್ಕಳಿಲ್ಲದೆ ಹೋಗಲಿ; transliteration: talakāḍu maral̤āgali, mālaṃgi maḍuvāgali, maisūru dŏrĕgal̤igĕ makkal̤illadĕ hogali).

=== Alamelamma's idol ===
Learning of this accident, the king felt repentant and had an idol of Alamelamma made in gold, installed it in the palace, and worshipped it as a deity. To this day, the idol can be found in Mysore Palace. The king's only surviving son, Narasaraja Wadiyar, died (believed to be an effect of the curse in folklore).

The Dasara festivities inside the palace end on the evening of Navarathri with a formal pooja to Alamelamma. Another interesting part of the story is that the Alamelamma temple is under the care of her legal heirs. Strangely, these priests/caretakers appear to be cursed by the same curse, following the same pattern afflicting the Wadiyars.

=== Talakadu and Malangi ===
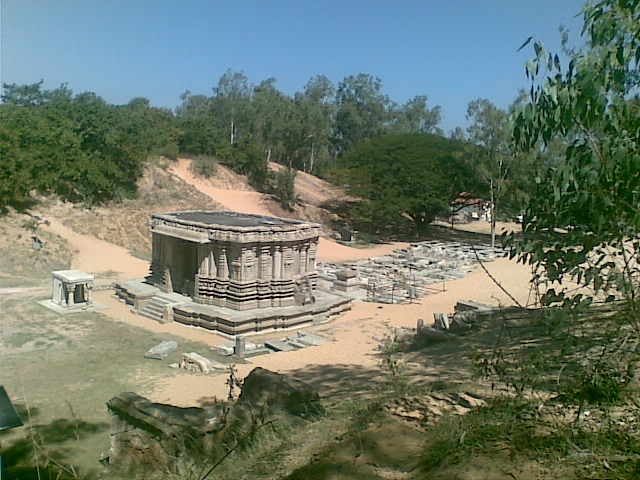
Lord Vishnu Temple under sand dunes in Talakadu, Karnataka

Talakadu and Malangi are two small towns near Tirumakudalu Narasipura on the banks of the Kaveri where the river takes a bend. To date, most parts of Talakadu lie under sand, and the village of Malangi is slowly eroding due to whirlpools. Talakadu's temples lie buried in a vast expanse of sand and are dug up and exposed every 12 years. At Malangi, on the other hand, the river is at its deepest. Whether these phenomena appeared only after Alamelamma's curse in 1610 is a matter of conjecture.

== Family tree of the Wadiyars ==
=== Direct lineage from Yaduraya ===
Raja Yaduraya is recorded as the founding ruler of the Kingdom of Mysore. The sixteenth maharaja Krishnaraja Wodeyar I was the last direct male lineage of Raja Yaduraja. However, Krishnaraja Wodeyar I's successor was his adopted son, Maharaja Chamaraja Wodeyar VII from the Ankanahalli Urs branch. After him, Maharaja Chamaraja Wodeyar III's second daughter Rajakumari Chikkadevi's family with the Bettada Kote Urs branch takes over the monarchy.

I. Yaduraya	Chikkadevi
II. Chamaraja Wodeyar I	?
III. Timmaraja Wodeyar I	?
IV. Chamaraja Wodeyar II	?
V. Chamaraja Wodeyar III	?	Kalale; Mallaraja Urs I	?
VI. Timmaraja Wodeyar II	Rajakumara; Krishnaraja	?	Rajakumari; Chikkadevi	Mallaraja Urs II	VII. Chamaraja Wodeyar IV	?
VIII. Chamaraja Wodeyar V	IX. Raja Wodeyar I	?	Rajakumara; Devaraja	?	Rajakumara; Bettada Chamaraja	?	Rajakumari; Chikkadepa
Yuvaraja; Narasaraja	?	XI. Raja Wodeyar II	Devaraja	?	XIII. Devaraja Wodeyar I	XII. Narasaraja Wodeyar I
X. Chamaraja Wodeyar VI	XIV. Devaraja Wodeyar II	?
XV. Narasaraja Wodeyar II	?
XVI. Krishnaraja Wodeyar I	Maharani; Devaja

=== Bettada Kote (Hill Fort) Urs branch ===
The Bettada Kote Urs was one of the larger jagirs, or feudal estates, in the Kingdom of Mysore. After the death of the 22nd ruler Maharaja Chamaraja Wodeyar VIII, his widowed queen mother Maharani Lakshmi Devi adopted Chamaraja Wodeyar IX of the Bettada Kote Urs branch which continues to-date.

Chikkanahalli; Chamaraja Urs	?	Bettada Kote Sardar; Gopalraj Urs	?
XVII. Chamaraja Wodeyar VII	?	XVIII. Krishnaraja Wodeyar II	Maharani; Lakshmi Devi	Karugahalli Sardar; Devaraj Urs	Honnajamma
XIX. Nanjaraja Wodeyar	XX. Chamaraja Wodeyar VIII	XXI. Chamaraja Wodeyar IX	Maharani; Kempananjammani Devi
XXII. Krishnaraja Wadiyar III	Maharani; Devarajammanni
Rajakumari; Puttammanni	Sardar; Krishnaraja Urs II
Maharani; Kempananjammani Devi	XXIII. Chamarajendra Wadiyar X	Yuvaraja; Sardar Gopal Raj Urs	Kantamanni Devi
XXIV. Krishnaraja Wadiyar IV	Maharani; Pratapa Kumaribai Devi	Yuvaraja; Kanteerava Narasimharaja Wadiyar	Yuvarani; Kempu Cheluvaja Devi	Rajakumari; Jayalakshmi Devi	Diwan; M. Kantharaj Urs	Rajakumari; Krishnajammani Devi	Col Desaraja Urs	Rajakumari; Cheluvajammani Devi	Sardar; M. Lakshmikantha Raj Urs	Col. Madan Gopala Krishna Urs	Kempumallaja Ammanni
Rani Vijaya Devi	?	Sujayakantha Ammani Devi	?	Maharani; Jayachamundi Ammani Devi	?	XXV. Jayachamarajendra Wadiyar	Tripurasundari Devi	K.G. Madan Gopala Raj Urs	Uma Devi Ammanni
Gayatri Devi	Kanthraj Basavaraj Urs	Meenakshi Devi	?	XXVI. Srikantadatta Narasimharaja Wadiyar	Maharani; Pramoda Devi	Kamakshi Devi	?	Indrakshi Devi	?	Vishalakshi Devi	?
Leela Tripurasundari Devi	Swarup Anand Gopalraj Urs
XXVII. Yaduveer Krishnadatta Chamaraja Wadiyar	Trishikha Kumari Devi	Jayathmika Lakshmi	Kunwar Divyraj Singhji
Adyaveer Narasimharaja Wadiyar

=== Kalale Urs branch ===
Kalale; Mallaraja Urs I	?
Mallaraja Urs II	Rajakumari; Chikkadevi
Thimmaraja Urs	Rajakumari; Chikkadepa
Sardar; Karikala Mallaraja Urs	?
Thimmaraja Urs II	?
Kantaraja Urs I	?	Maddur; Narasaraja Urs
Sardar; Raja Urs I	?
Sardar; Viraraja Urs	?
Sardar Karachuri; Nanjaraja Urs	?
Maharani; Devaja	XVI. Krishnaraja Wodeyar I

=== Maddur Urs branch ===
Maddur; Narasaraja Urs	?
Maddur; Kantharaja Urs II	?
Maddur; Krishnaraja Urs	?
Maddur; Krishnaraja Urs III	?
Maddur; Narasaraja Urs II	?
Maddur; Kantharaja Urs III	?
Maddur; N. Kantharaja Urs IV	?
Dewan; M. Kantharaj Urs	Maharani; Kempananjammani Devi	XXIII. Chamarajendra Wadiyar X
Rajakumari; Jayalakshmi Devi
Rajakumari; Lelavathi

== Contributions ==
The Wadiyars were patrons of fine arts, fostering a number of famous musicians, writers and painters. Their contributions to music and literature has rendered the city of Mysore a cultural centre of Karnataka.

In 1940, Jaya Chamaraja Wadiyar in association with industrialist Walchand Hirachand founded Hindustan Aircraft Limited (HAL) in Bengaluru whose name was later changed to Hindustan Aeronautics Limited (HAL).

== See also ==
- Dewan of Mysore
- Kingdom of Mysore
- Maharaja of Mysore
- Mysore
- Mysore State
- Srirangapatna
- Talakad
