= Lakshmi Ammani Devi =

Lakshmi Ammanni Devi
- Maharani of Mysore
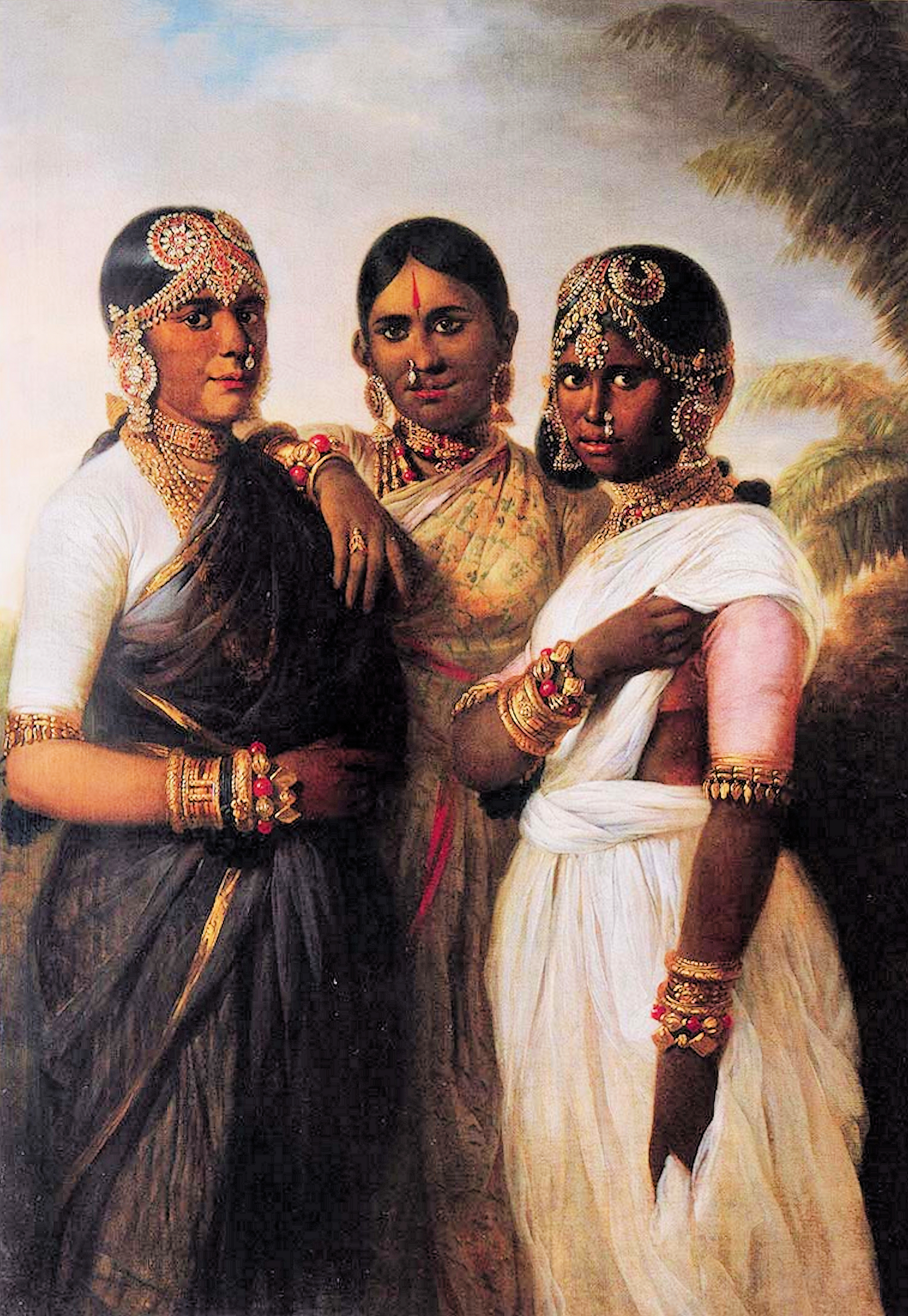
- Portrait (centre) by Thomas Hickey, 1805
- Born: 1742
- Died: 1810 (aged 67–68)
- Spouse: Krishnaraja Wodeyar II
Names
- Maharani Lakshmammanni Lakshmi Vilasa Sannidhana Avaru

Lakshmi Ammani Devi (1742-1810) was the Maharani of the Kingdom of Mysore and later regent of Mysore between 1799 and 1810 during the minority of Krishnaraja Wadiyar III.

== Life and regency ==
She was born to Sardar Kathi Gopalraj Urs, of the Bettadakotte family. She became the third wife of Maharaja Krishnaraja Wadiyar II.

She was regent of Mysore during the minority of her adopted grandson, Maharaja Krishnaraja Wadiyar III, from 25 June 1799 to February 1810. The period is referred to as Laksmi Vilas Sannidhana.
