= Krishnaraja Wodeyar III =

Maharaja of Mysore from 1799 to 1868

Krishnaraja Wadiyar III
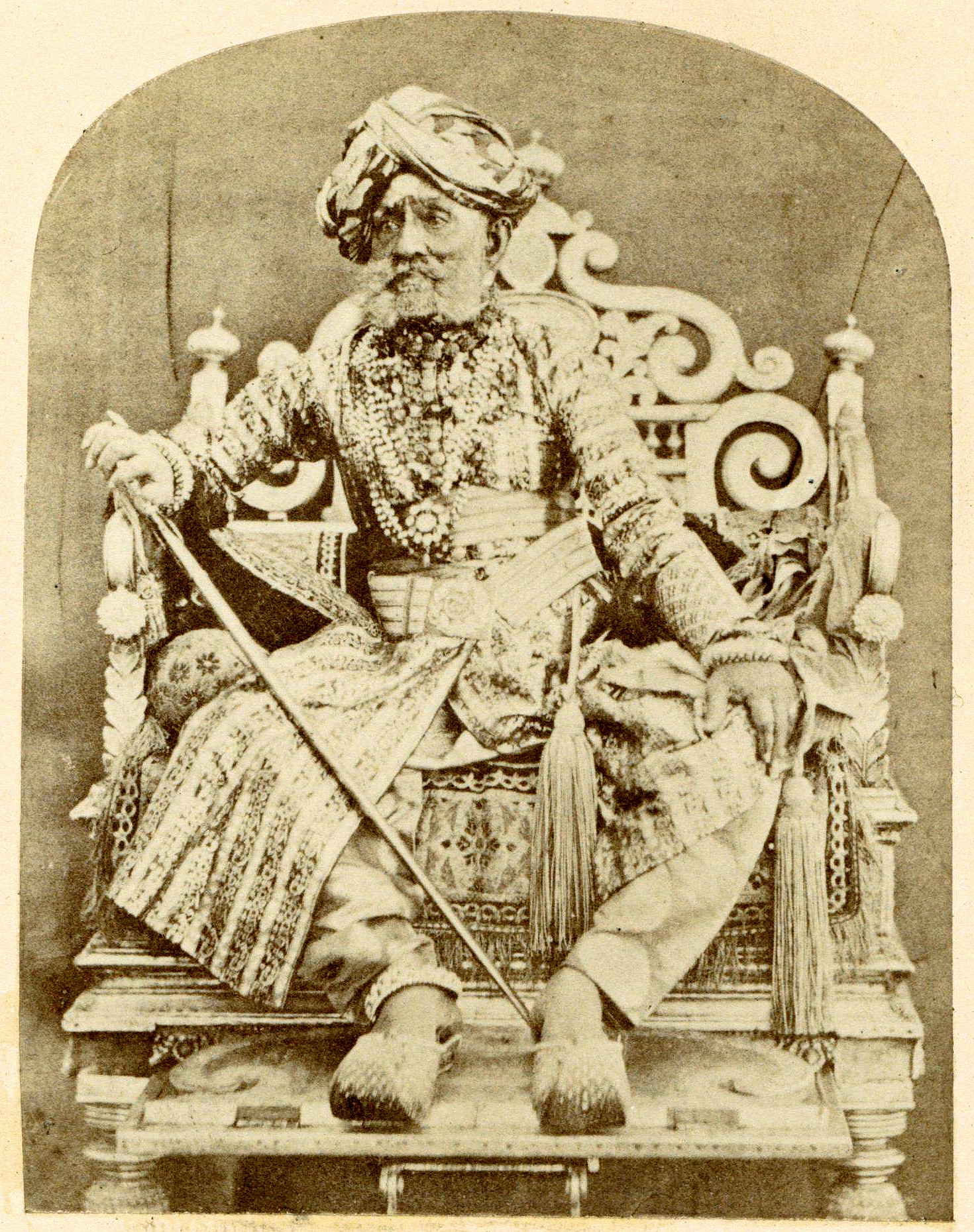
- Photograph of Maharaja Krishnaraja Wodeyar III, c. 1866

22nd Maharaja of Mysore
- Reign: 30 June 1799 – 19 October 1831; 19 October 1831 – 27 March 1868 (titular)
- Coronation: 30 June 1799, Royal Palace, Mysore
- Predecessor: Chamaraja Wodeyar IX (1776–1796) (father)
- Successor: Chamarajendra Wadiyar X
- Born: 14 July 1794; Royal Palace, Srirangapatna, Sultanate of Mysore, (present-day Karnataka, India)
- Died: 27 March 1868 (aged 73); Royal Palace, Mysore, Kingdom of Mysore (present-day Karnataka, India)
- Spouse: Devajammanni
- Issue: Chamarajendra Wadiyar X (adopted son)
Names
- Sriman Rajadhiraja Raja Parameshvara Praudha-pratapa Apratima-vira Narapati Birud-antembara-ganda Maharaja Sir Krishnaraja Wodeyar III Bahadur
- House: Wadiyar dynasty
- Father: Chamaraja Wodeyar IX
- Mother: Maharani Kempa Nanja Ammani Avaru
- Religion: Hinduism

Krishnaraja Wadiyar III (14 July 1794 – 27 March 1868) was a Kannadiga king who was the twenty-second Maharaja of Mysore. He ruled the kingdom for nearly seventy years, from 30 June 1799 until his death, for a good portion of the latter period of which he was merely a nominal ruler. He is known for his contribution and patronage to different arts and music during his reign. He was succeeded by his biological grandson and adopted son, Chamarajendra Wadiyar X.

== Early years ==
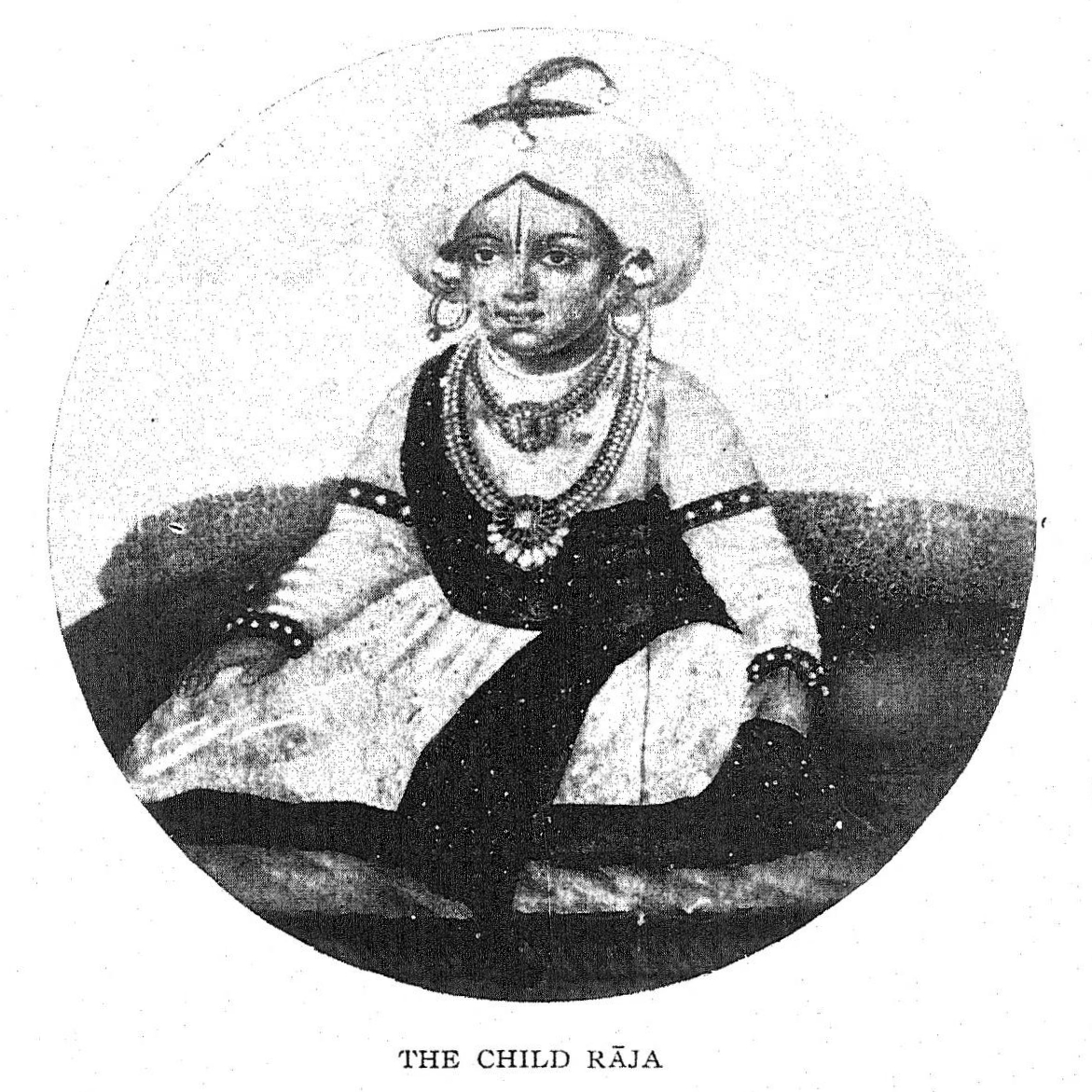
Krishnaraja Wodeyar III as a child

Krishnaraja Wodeyar III was born at Srirangapatna to Maharaja Chamaraja Wadiyar IX and his first wife, Maharani Kempananjammani Devi. Maharani Lakshmi Devi, his adoptive grandmother, played a major role in the education and upbringing of her adopted grandson, Krishnaraja Wodeyar III, and was instrumental in his ascent to the throne.

Since the insurrection of Mysore and storming into power by Hyder Ali and Tipu, Lakshmi Devi had been awaiting an opportunity to unseat Ali, who died, and later his son, and had delegated numerous feelers to the British to unseat him and hand over the kingdom to the Wadiyars. She also informed the British about the treaty between Tipu and the French. When Tipu died at the hands of the British in 1799, she discussed the handing-over of the Mysore throne, which finally led to the installation of the five-year-old Krishnaraja Wodeyar III as the Maharaja of Mysore on 30 June 1799 under her regency.

The ceremony took place in a special pavilion constructed near the Lakshmiramana Swamy temple in Mysore. Being led to it by Arthur Wellesley on his right, Lakshmi Devi managed to have Tipu's adviser Purnaiah continue as the Dewan of Mysore with the instruction that he should be loyal to the king till the latter himself attains the age of discretion.

== Ruler of Mysore State ==
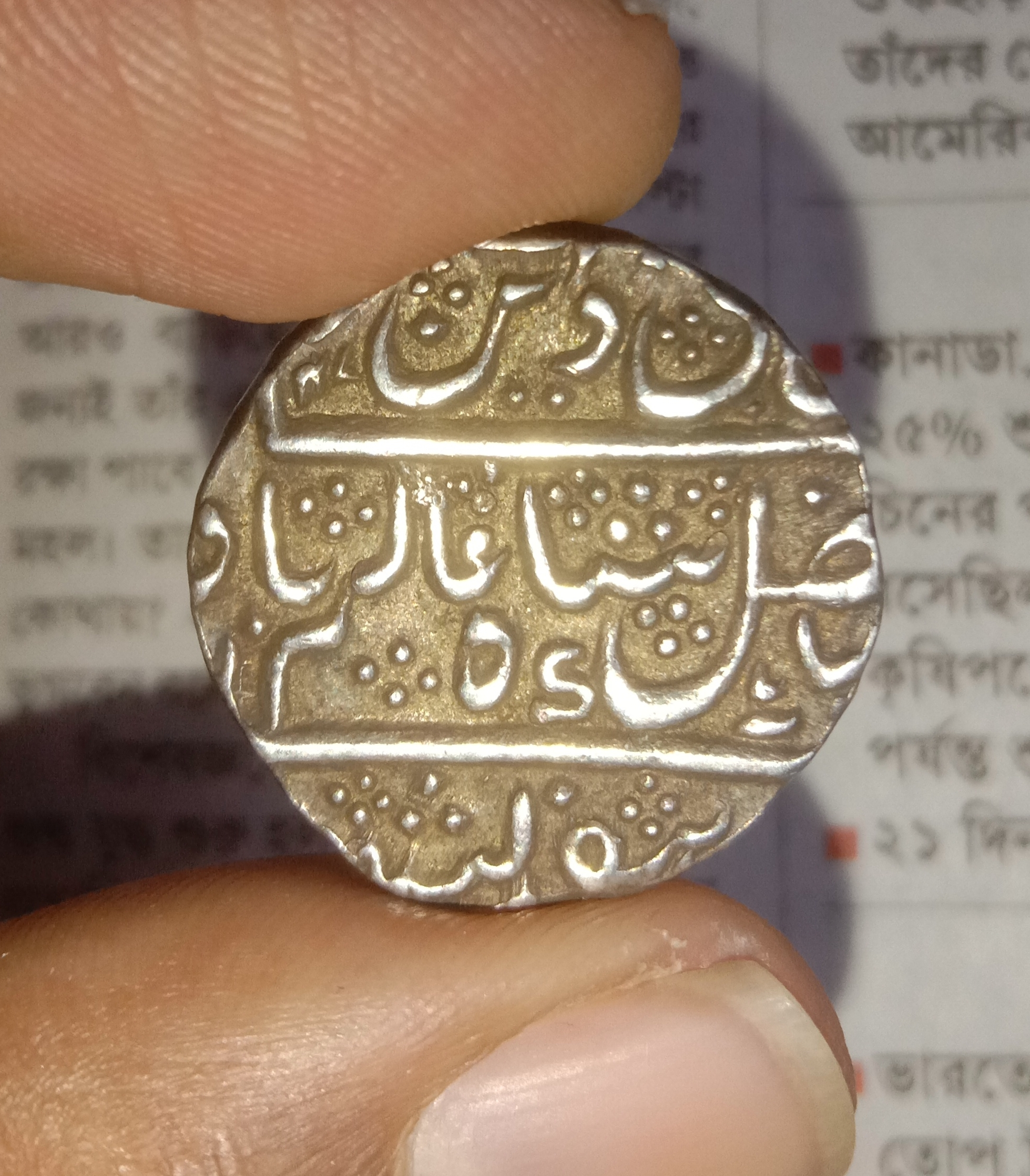
Silver Rupee of Krishna Raja Wodeyar III, Mysore State, struck in the name of Mughal emperor Shah Alam II, Zarb Mahisur Mint, RY47, AD 1805.

Krishnaraja Wodeyar III attained the age of 16 in early 1810, an age then no longer deemed him a minor. After discussing with Arthur Cole, the British Resident of Mysore, the reins of the state were transferred from Purnaiah to the prince. Wodeyar's grandmother died in 1810, soon followed by Purnaiah, who died in 1812.

=== Removal from power ===
The years that followed witnessed cordial relations between Mysore and the British until things began to sour in the 1820s. Even though Thomas Munro, the governor of Madras, determined after a personal investigation in 1825 that there was no substance to the allegations of financial impropriety made by Cole, the civil insurrection leading to the Nagar revolt broke out towards the end of the decade and changed things considerably. In 1831, close on the heels of the insurrection and citing maladministration, the British took direct control of the princely state and instituted Mysore Commission. For the next fifty years, Mysore passed under the rule of successive British Commissioners; Mark Cubbon, renowned for his statesmanship, served from 1834 until 1861 and put into place an efficient and successful administrative system which left Mysore a well-developed state.

== Contribution to culture ==
Krishnaraja Wodeyar III was responsible for the cultural growth of the Kingdom of Mysore. He was himself a writer, having written Kannada books like Sritattvanidhi and Sougandhikaparinaya. He also has a number of writers in his court who together contributed to the development of modern Kannada prose, which had a style different from the Champu style of prose which was followed till then. Other important writings that emerged during his rule include Mudramanjusha by Kempu Narayana, Kalavati Parinaya by Yadava, and Vachana Kadamabari. The king was well versed in many languages, including Sanskrit, Kannada, Tamil, English, Telugu, and Urdu. He even played the musical instrument, veena. He was an expert player of board games and is credited to have revived the Ganjifa game. He was also a collector and an inventor of board games.

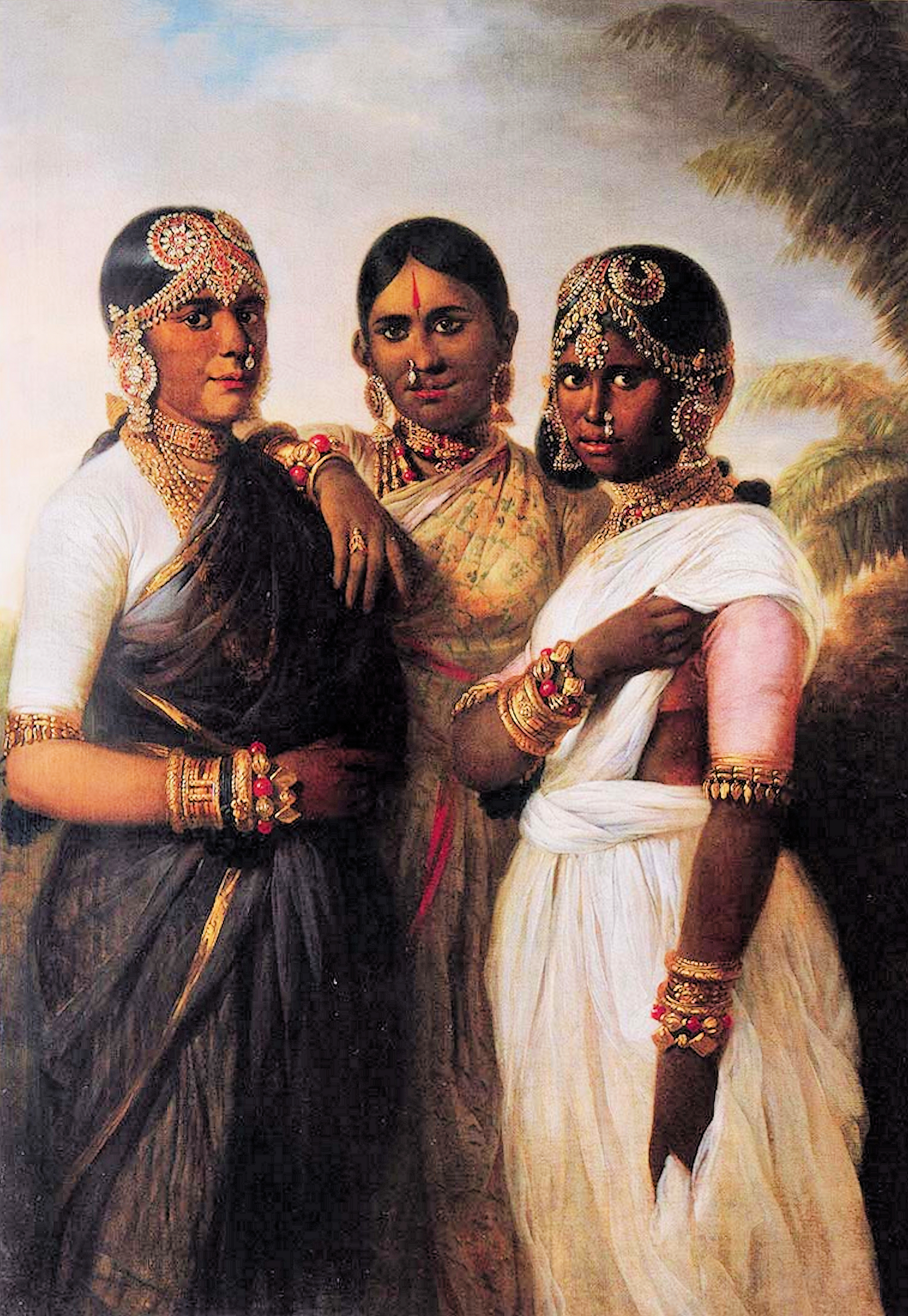
"Queens" of Mysore: left, Krishnaraja Wodeyar III's first wife, Devajammani, right, his second wife, also named Devajammani. Thomas Hickey, 1805. The two queens in the painting are thought to advertise vaccination over variolation, as they display the respective traces on their skin.

Krishnaraja Wodeyar III was a ruler who gave a lot of importance to the development of art during his period. He patronised many scholars in his court and he himself was a great Kannada and Sanskrit Scholar, and has composed more than 50 works. The Yakshagana form of literature, its growth, and survival are all due to his efforts. Parti Subba from South Canara, a famous Yakshagana writer, flourished during his period. Devachandra, Venkatarama Shastri, Basavappa Shastri, Aliya Lingaraja, Kempu Narayana, Srinivasa Kavisarvabhouma, Thammaya Kavi, Nanjunda Kavi, Shantaraja Pandita were all patronised by him.

Devachandra wrote Rajavali Katha which is of great historical importance and also Ramakathavathara, a work in Champu style. Kempu Narayana wrote Mudra Manjusha, which is a Kannada prose. Asthana Vidwan Basavappa Shastri has written various works. He composed Kannada poems such as Shakuntala, Vikramorvasiya, Rathnavali, Chandakousika, and Uttara Ramacharita. He has also translated the famous work of Shakespeare, Othello, into Kannada and it is known as Shurasena Charita. He has also written Damayanti in Champu style, Savitri Charita in Shatpadi, Sri Raghavendra Swamy Ashtottara Stotram, and numerous other works in Sanskrit.

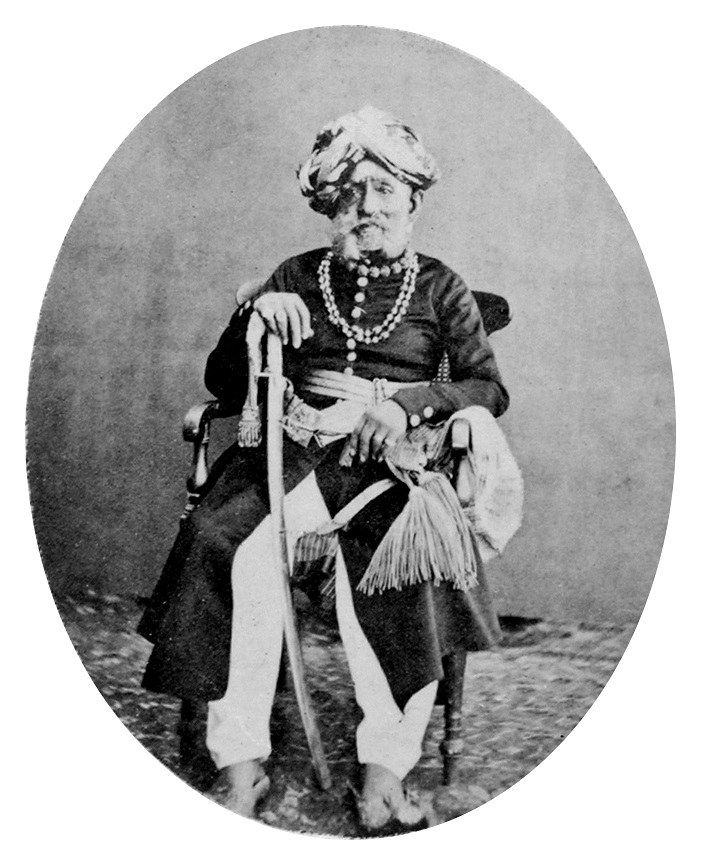
Krishnaraja Wadiyar lll in 1866

Krishnaraja Wodeyar III has composed many works like Dasharatha Nandana Charita, Grahana Darpana, Sankya Ratna Kosha, Chaturanga Sara Sarvasva, Sri Tatvanidhi, Saugandhika Parinaya, Sri Krishna Katha Sangraha, Ramayana, Mahabharata, Surya Chandra Vamsavali, etc. He was called Bhoja Raja of Kannada. Wodeyar's Surya Chandra Vamsavali narrates a hundred episodes from the Ramyana and the Mahabharata, and the adventures of Yaduraya and Krishnaraya, the founders of the Wadiyar Dynasty.

Krishnaraja Wodeyar III also sponsored a number of art pieces and invited a large number of artists to the royal workshop, where a number of ambitious projects including murals and illustrated manuscripts were commissioned. These included illustrated volumes of the Bhagavata Purana and a splendid Ramayana featuring Rama shooting a flaming arrow exploding on the page.

== See also ==
- Mummadi

== Notes ==
Krishnaraja Wodeyar III Wodeyar dynasty Born: 1794 Died: 1868
Regnal titles
| Preceded by Tipu Sultan (as Ruler of Mysore) | Maharaja of Mysore; 1799–1831 | Succeeded by J. Briggs (As Senior Commissioner) and C. M. Lushington (As Junior Commissioner) |
Titles in pretence
| Preceded by None | — TITULAR — Maharaja of Mysore; 1831–1868 | Incumbent; Heir: Chamarajendra Wadiyar X |
