= Nanjaraja Wodeyar =

Maharaja of Mysore from 1766 to 1770

19th Maharaja of Mysore
- Reign: 25 April 1766 – 2 August 1770
- Coronation: Srirangapatna, 6 May 1766
- Predecessor: Krishnaraja Wadiyar II (father)
- Successor: Chamaraja Wodeyar VIII (younger brother)
- Born: 1748
- Died: 2 August 1770 (aged 21–22); Royal Palace, Srirangapata
- House: Wodeyar
- Dynasty: Wodeyar dynasty
- Father: Krishnaraja Wodeyar II
- Mother: Devaja Ammani Avaru
- Religion: Hinduism

Nanjaraja Wodeyar (Nanjaraja Wodeyar Bahadur; 1748 – 2 August 1770) was the nineteenth maharaja of the Kingdom of Mysore for only four years, from 1766 to 1770.

== Life ==
He was eldest son of Maharaja Krishnaraja Wodeyar II, and succeeded on the death of his father in 1766.

== See also ==
- Wodeyar dynasty
