= Sarvadhikari =

Administrative title in India

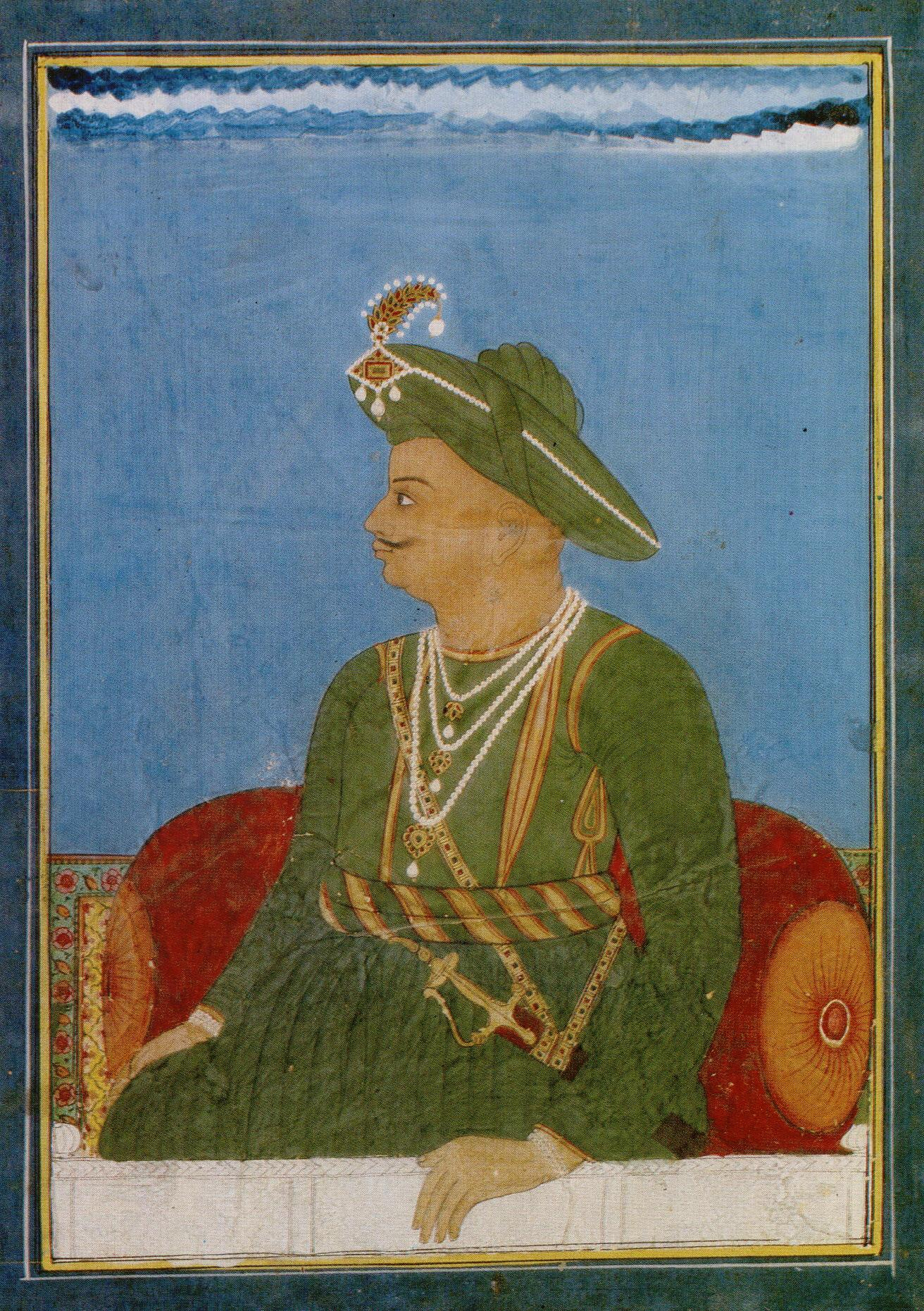
Tipu Sultan, Sarvadhikari of Mysore, who was appointed this position after Hyder Ali's demise, 2 January 1783.

Sarvādhikārī is a title with diverse uses in India, including:

- An old title for the Chief minister of a southern Indian ruler, notably of:
  - Under the Western Ganga Dynasty's Maharaja Dharma of Talakkad (in modern Karnataka state), heading a cabinet which further included the Sandhivigrahi (minister for dispute settlement), the Dandanayaka, the commander-in-chief of the armed forces, Srikaranadhikari (minister of finance and revenue), Manemagatine or Manevergade (steward of the royal household) and Hiriyabhandari (in charge of accounts and keeping of records); sometimes, the Purohita too found a place in this council of ministers, advising in matters of religion
  - The hereditary Chief Minister of Mysore; this was the office Tipu Sultan succeeded his father Hyder Ali and established a Muslim dynasty called Sarkar-e-Khudadad (God-gifted kingdom)
- Superintendent, e.g. of a military camp
- General manager of an enterprise

== Sources ==
- Platt's dictionary
- Our Karnataka
- IMDb
