= Chamaraja Wodeyar VII =

Maharaja of Mysore from 1732 to 1734

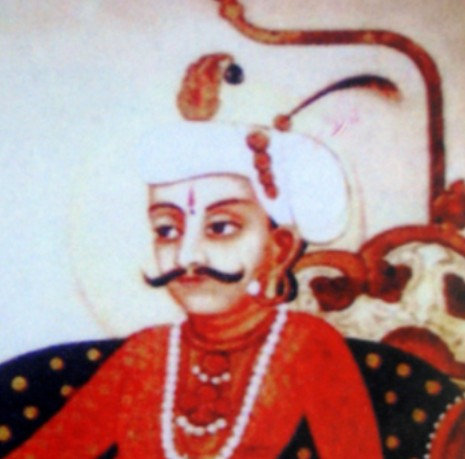
- A modern representation of Chamaraja Wodeyar VII (1806)

17th Maharaja of Mysore
- Reign: 19 March 1732 – 10 June 1734
- Coronation: 19 March 1732
- Predecessor: Dodda Krishnaraja I (adoptive father)
- Successor: Krishnaraja Wadiyar II (brother)
- Born: Chamaiya Hadidentu Tingal; 1704
- Died: 1734 (aged 29–30); Kabaladurga
- House: Wodeyar
- Dynasty: Wodeyar dynasty
- Father: Devaraj Urs Dodda Krishnaraja I (adoptive father)
- Religion: Hinduism

Chamaraja Wodeyar VII (1704–1734) was the seventeenth maharaja of the Kingdom of Mysore. He nominally ruled from 1732 to 1734.

== Adoption and coronation ==
He was son of Devaraj Urs of Ankanhalli and adopted by Maharani Devajamma and Maharaja Dodda Krishnaraja Wodeyar I.

On 19 March 1732, he ascended the throne at Seringapatam. Two years later, on 10 June 1734, he was deposed and imprisoned along with his wife for opposing the dalvoys, his late father's cousin Nanjaraja and commander Devaraja. He died in prison at Kabaladurga the same year. He was succeeded by his brother, Krishnaraja Wadiyar II.

== See also ==
- Wodeyar dynasty
