= Dalavayi =

Indian title

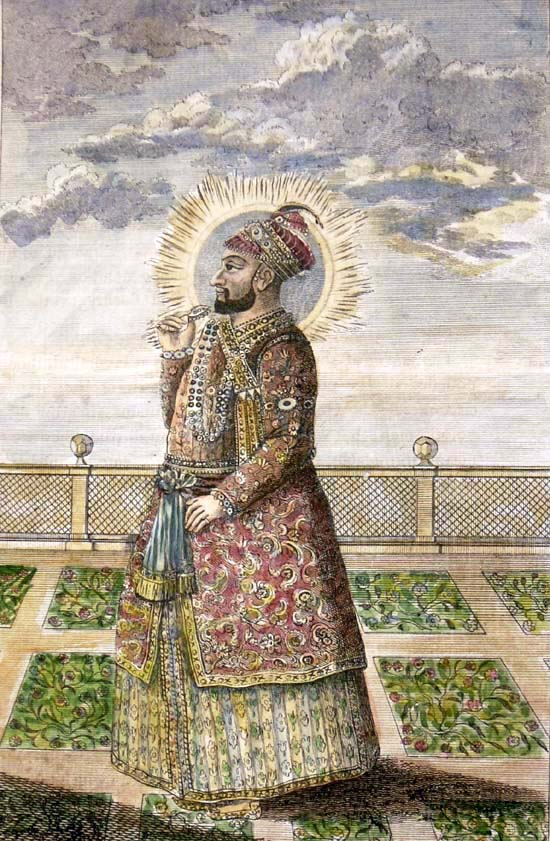
Hyder Ali, Dalavayi of the Kingdom of Mysore

A Dalavayi also spelled Dalwai, Dalavay and Dalvoy was a Commander-in-chief in Peninsular India. In the Vijayanagara Empire, Vira Narasimha Raya was appointed to the position before being crowned the Emperor of Vijayanagara. And in the Kingdom of Mysore, Commander Hyder Ali and his eldest son Tipu Sultan were appointed to this position.

The word Dalavayi is a Prakrit or vernacular form of the Sanskrit word Dalapati (which literally means: leader or chief of the team or a wing). In western India, especially in the modern states of Maharashtra and Goa, the descendants of Dalavayis still use the title Dalvi (Devanagari: दळवी) as surname, which is modern form of the Prakrit word Dalavayi.
