= Maharaja of Mysore =

Ruler of the Kingdom of Mysore

- Royal coat of arms (1893)

Details
- Style: His Highness
- First monarch: Yaduraya Wodeyar
- Last monarch: Jayachamaraja Wodeyar
- Formed: 1399
- Abolished: 26 January 1950
- Residence: Mysore Palace

The Maharaja of Mysore was the king and principal ruler of the Kingdom of Mysore between the late 14th century to 1947, and briefly of the princely state of Mysore in the Dominion of India between August 1947 and January 1950.

In the late 14th century CE, the Vijayanagara Empire appointed local chieftains called poleygars. Yaduraya Wodeyar, a Vijayanagara chieftain, took control in the Mysore region, and adopted the title raja (king) in 1399 CE. Chamaraja Wodeyar III (1513–1553 CE) built a small fort and a settlement named Mahisuranagara (buffalo town) near the Kaveri River, around which the state of Mysore developed later. After the decline of the Vijayanagara Empire, Timmaraja Wodeyar II declared independence and assumed the title of Maharaja (great king) of Mysore.

The kingdom expanded significantly during the reigns of Kanthirava Narasaraja I (1638–1659 CE) and Dodda Kempadevaraja (1659–1673 CE). The kingdom became weak in the 18th century CE, and during the reign of Krishnaraja Wodeyar II, Hyder Ali gained power as dalvoy (commander-in-chief) in 1761, thus reducing the maharaja to a nominal ruler. Hyder Ali's son Tipu ruled Mysore as the sultan from 1782 to 1799 until his defeat in the Anglo-Mysore wars.

In 1799, the British Empire took control of Mysore and restored it to the Wadiyar dynasty, and Krishnaraja Wadiyar III became the maharaja. The British ruled Mysore directly through the Mysore Commission from 1831 to 1881. The power was restored to the Wadiyars in 1881, when Chamarajendra Wadiyar X was crowned as the king. Several administrative reforms, industries, education and infrastructure projects were implemented during the reign of Chamarajendra X and his successor Krishnaraja Wadiyar IV. Jayachamaraja Wadiyar ascended to the throne in 1940, and was the last recognised maharaja, as India achieved independence in 1947. He remained a nominal ruler until India became a republic in 1950, and the honorary title of maharaja was abolished in 1971.

== Origins ==
In the late 14th century CE, in the Vijayanagara Empire, the administration and protection of the various regions were designated to the respective local chieftains. The protection of the regions in and around present-day Mysore was given to Yaduraya Wodeyar, the Vijayanagara chieftain stationed in the region at that time. The local chief, who was till then known by the title of poleygar (Kannada: pālegāra meaning 'chieftain') during the early days of the fiefdom, Yaduraya later took over the title of raja (king, especially a small region) in 1399 CE.

Chamaraja Wodeyar III, who ruled from 1513 to 1553 CE over the territory consisting of a few villages close to the Kaveri River, constructed a small fort and named it 'Mahisuranagara' (Kannada: buffalo town). Though the region was referred to as 'Mahishaka' in early Indian literature, the later state of Mysore developed around the town.

== Maharaja ==
With the decline of the Vijayanagara Empire, Chamaraja Wodeyar III's son and successor Timmaraja Wodeyar II declared independence and assumed the title of Maharaja (great king) of Mysore. During the reigns of Kanthirava Narasaraja I (1638-1659 CE) and Dodda Kempadevaraja (1659-1673 CE), the territory of the kingdom was expanded significantly. However, the kingdom started to become weak under the rule of Dodda Krishnaraja I (1714-1732 CE). Hence, during the later reign of Krishnaraja Wodeyar II (1734–1766), Hyder Ali, who was a soldier in the kingdom, took over as the dalvoy (commander-in-chief) and reducing the maharaja to a nominal ruler. Ali's son Tipu proclaimed himself Sultan of Mysore and ruled from 1782-1799 CE.

In 1799 CE, after the defeat of Tipu in the Anglo-Mysore wars, the region came under the control of the British Empire, and the Wadiyars were restored as the maharajas. Krishnaraja Wadiyar III was restored as the maharaja under his grandmother's regency. While Krishnaraja's reign lasted for nearly seventy years, till 1868, he was not in control of the kingdom from 1831. In 1831, citing maladministration, the British took direct control of the princely state of Mysore and instituted the Mysore Commission. The region was ruled by British Commissioners, while the maharaja remained without actual power. Krishnaraja III was considered a great patron of arts, and he instituted the first English school, which later became a precursor to Mysore University.

Though Krishnaraja III appealed for a return of power, it was rejected, and the deposed king died a dejected man. Chamarajendra Wadiyar X ascended the throne on 23 September 1868. The state, which had been under the direct administration of the British Raj since 1831, was restored to the Wadiyar dynasty by an instrument of rendition in 1881, and Chamarajendra X was officially handed the reins in the same year. Chamarajendra X ruled till 1894, and during his reign, various irrigation and industrial projects were carried out. He divided the state into several administrative divisions, and established the Mysore Representative Assembly in 1881, one of the earliest legislative institutions in princely India. He founded several schools including Maharaja's College, Mysore and Oriental Research Institute Mysore, textile mills, and expanded mining activities at the Kolar Gold Fields. Several buildings including the Bangalore Palace and Lalbagh Glass House in Bangalore, Dufferin Clock Tower, and Mysore Zoo in Mysore, and the Fernhills Palace in Ooty were built during his reign. He started the annual Dasara Industrial Exhibition, patronised several artisans, and established agricultural banks.

Krishna Raja Wadiyar IV ascended the throne in 1895 following the death of his father, Chamarajendra X, in 1894. During his reign, the Mysore Legislative Council was established in 1907. He also established several educational institutions, hospitals, research institutes and industries. After Krishnaraja IV died in 1940, Jayachamaraja Wadiyar ascended the throne, and he was the last maharaja of the state. During Jayachamaraja's reign, several educational and research institutes were established, and the Hindustan Aeronautics Limited was established in 1940. As India gained independence from the British Crown in 1947, crown allies acceded to the Dominion of India, and the maharaja continued as a nominal ruler till January 1950.

== Gallery ==
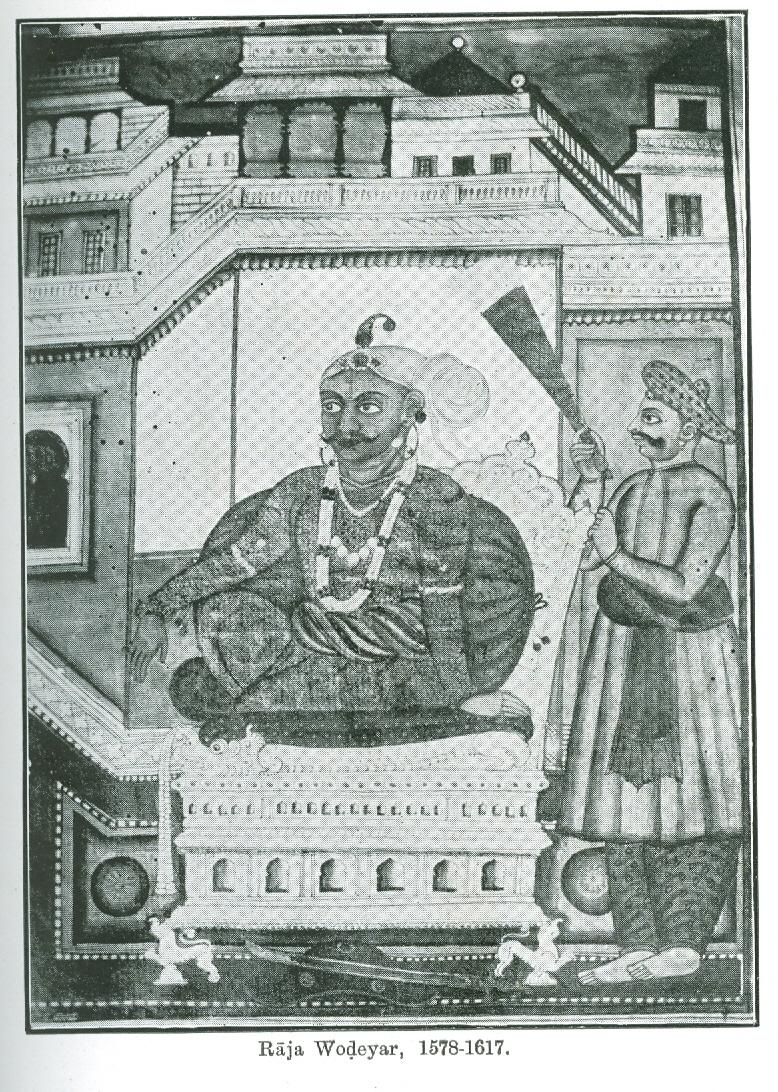
Raja Wodeyar I (1578–1617)

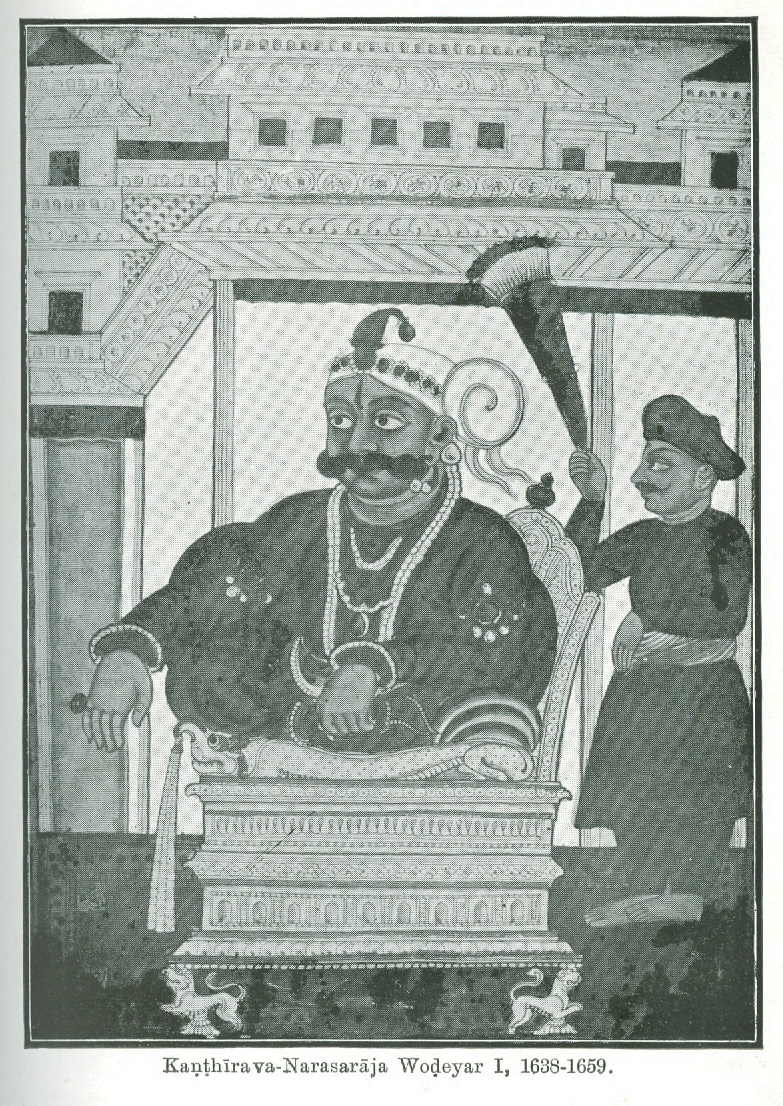
Kanthirava Narasaraja I (1638–1659)

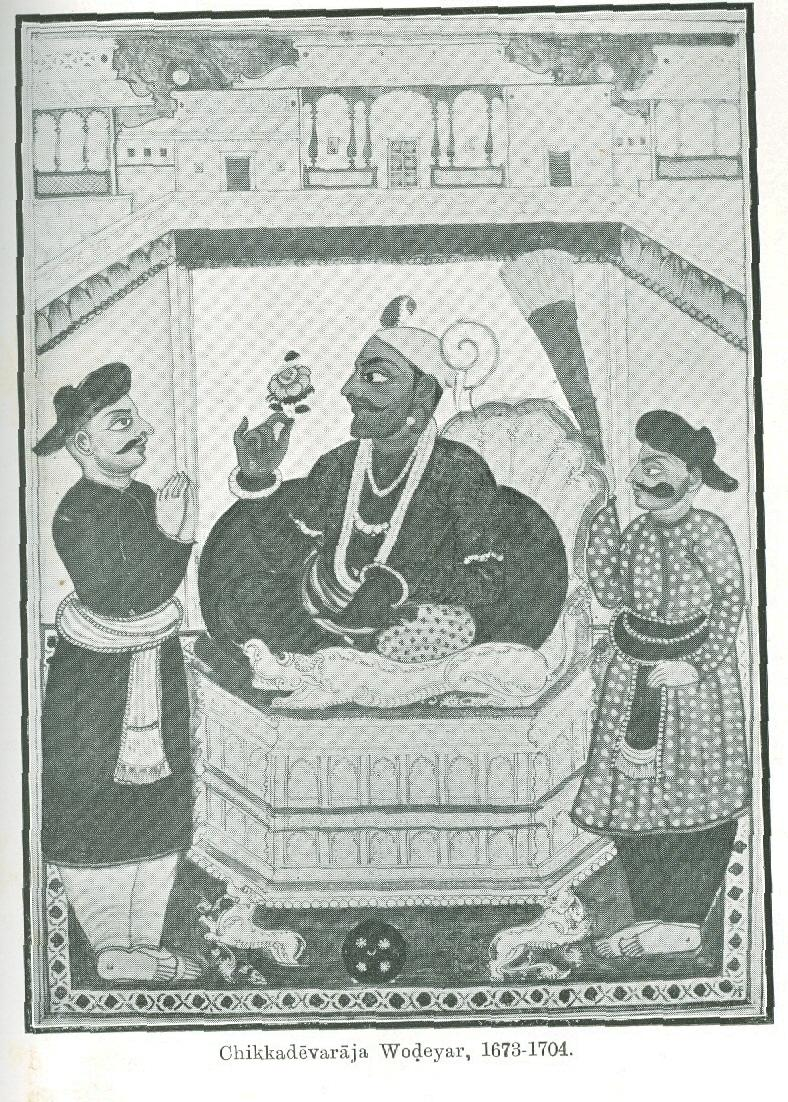
Chikka Devaraja (1673–1704)

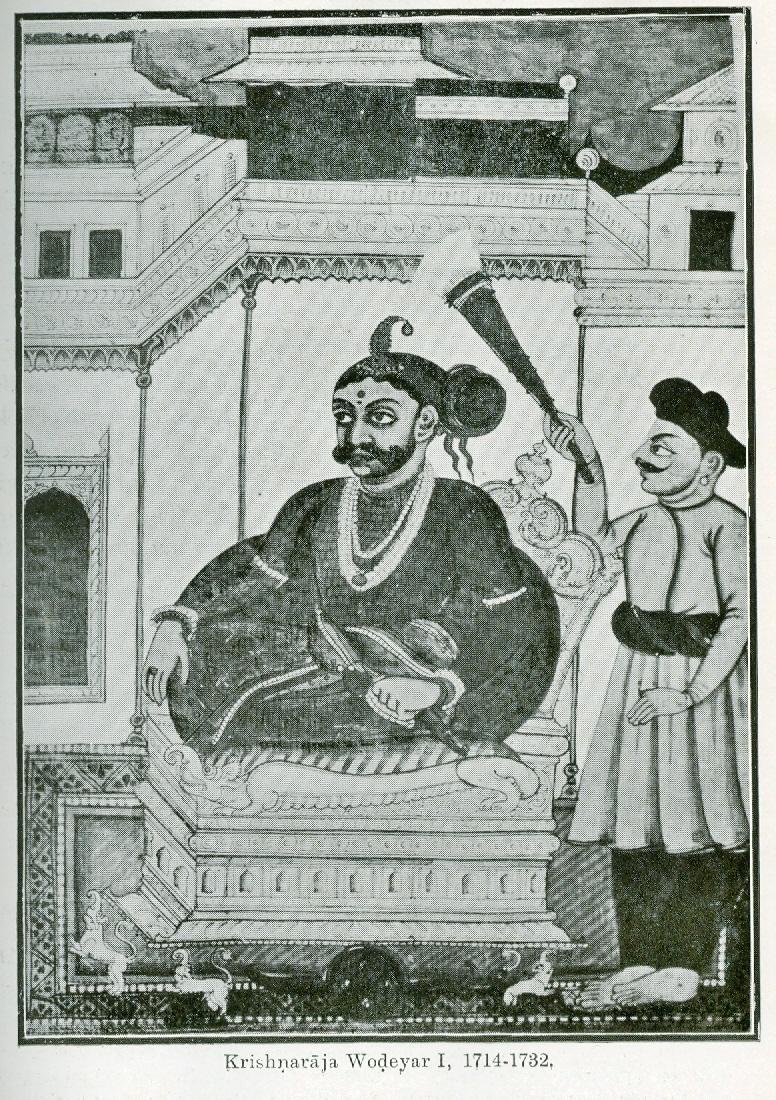
Dodda Krishnaraja I (1714–1732)

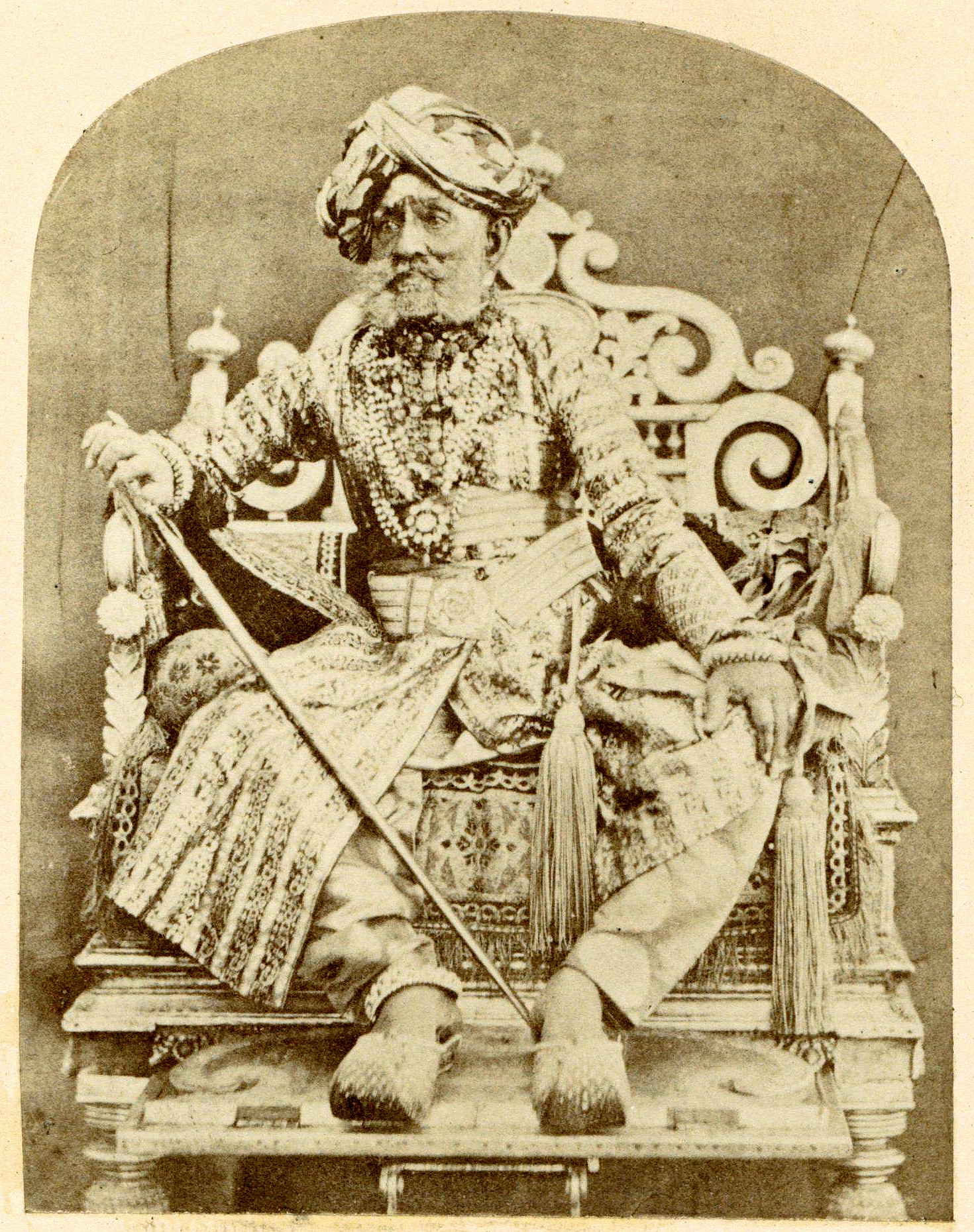
Krishnaraja Wodeyar III (1799–1868)

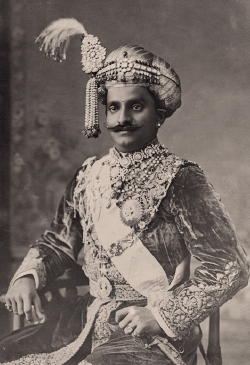
Chamarajendra Wadiyar X (1868–1894)

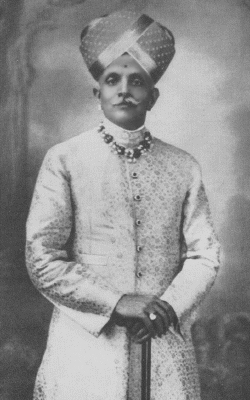
Krishna Raja Wadiyar IV (1894–1940)

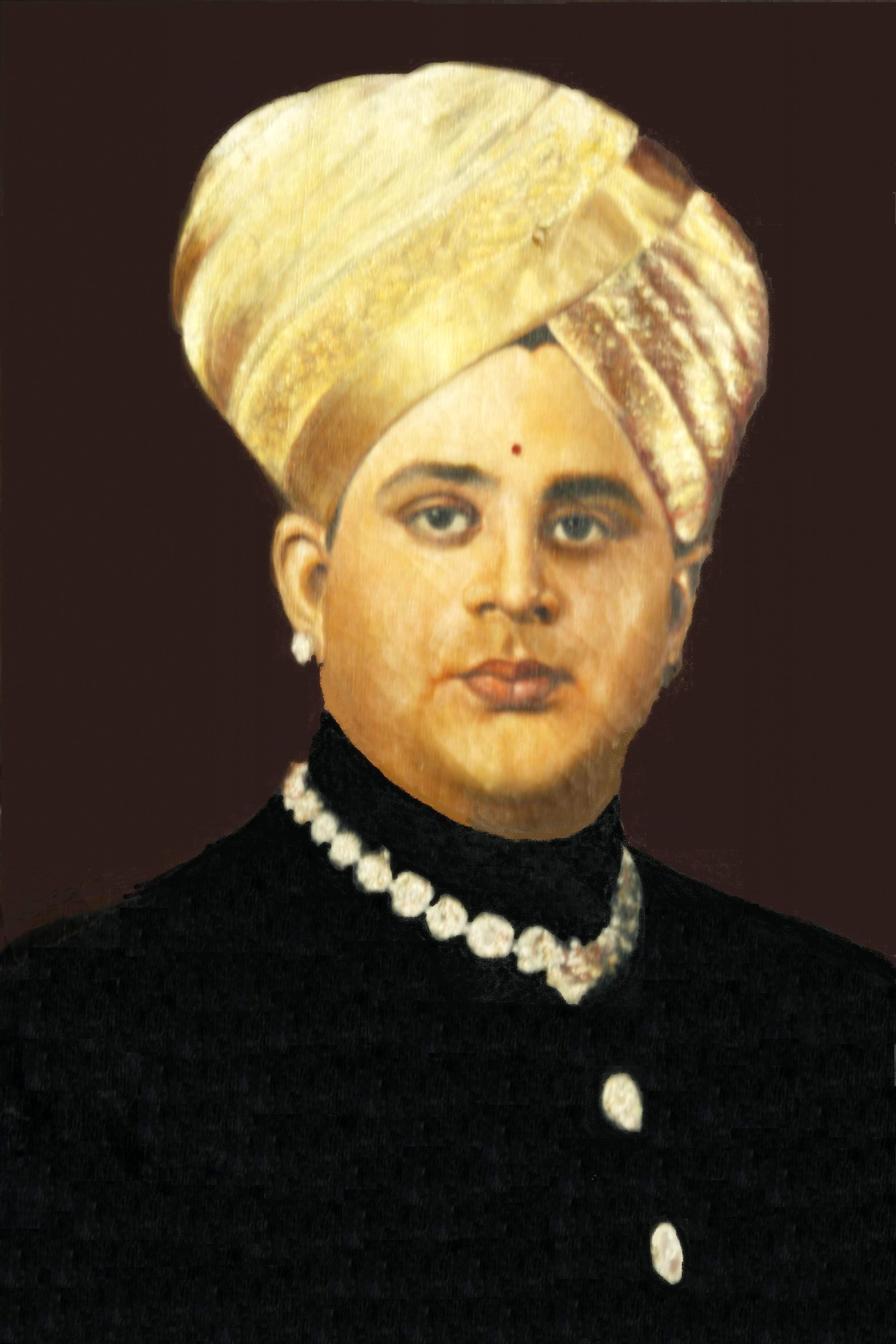
Jayachamarajendra Wadiyar (1940–1950)

== Aftermath ==
After India became a republic in 1950, the role of maharaja was replaced with that of the rajpramukh and later governor. In the democratic system, the governor is appointed by the President. Nevertheless, like most kings in India at that time, the maharaja and his successors were allowed an annual payment or privy purse, certain privileges, and the use of the title of "Maharaja". However, after the 26th Amendment to the Constitution of India was enacted in 1971, the titles and privy purse were discontinued. Although the titles and privy purse were abolished in 1971, the Wadiyar family has retained a prominent ceremonial role, and the title "Maharaja of Mysore" continues to be used in cultural and ceremonial contexts. In 2015, Yaduveer Krishnadatta Chamaraja Wodeyar was crowned as the titular head of the dynasty in a traditional ceremony. The ceremony was attended by several elected representatives, including former Prime Minister H. D. Deve Gowda, Karnataka Home Minister K. J. George, and state ministers V. Srinivas Prasad and D. K. Shivakumar. The palace is guarded by a dedicated Palace Security Force headed by an Assistant Commissioner of Police (ACP), and in 2022 the family hosted Prime Minister Narendra Modi at the palace.

== See also ==
- Dewan of Mysore

== Bibliography ==
- Imperial Gazetteer of India: Provincial Series (1908). Mysore and Coorg. Calcutta: Superintendent of Government Printing. Pp. xvii, 365, 1 map.
- Kamath, Suryanath U. (2001) [1980]. A concise history of Karnataka: from pre-historic times to the present. Bangalore: Jupiter books. LCCN 80905179. OCLC 7796041.
- Manor, James (1975). "Princely Mysore before the Storm: The State-Level Political System of India's Model State, 1920–1936". Modern Asian Studies. 9 (1): 31–58. doi:10.1017/s0026749x00004868. JSTOR 311796. S2CID 146415366.
- Michell, George (1995). Architecture and Art of Southern India: Vijayanagara and the successor states: 1350–1750. Cambridge University Press. ISBN 0-521-44110-2.
- Ramusack, Barbara (2004). The Indian Princes and their States. Cambridge University Press. ISBN 0-521-03989-4.
- Simmons, Caleb (2019). Devotional Sovereignty: Kingship and Religion in India. Oxford University Press. ISBN 978-0-19-008890-3.
- Stein, Burton (1987). Vijayanagara. Cambridge University Press. ISBN 0-521-26693-9.
