= Kingdom of Mysore =

Monarchy in India (1399–1947)

Coordinates: 12.30°N 76.65°E

- 1399–1950 (Note: 1761-1799: Sultanate of Mysore ruled by Hyder Ali and Tipu Sultan)
- Coat of arms
- Royal anthem: "Kāyau Śrī Gaurī" (1868–1950); English: "Great Gaurī (Parvati)"
- The kingdom of Mysore at its greatest extent in 1784 under Tipu Sultan
- Status: Vassal of the Vijaynagar Empire (before 1565); Independent state (1565-1799); Princely state of India (1799-1947)
- Capital: Mysore, Srirangapatna, Bangalore
- Largest city: Bangalore
- Official languages: Kannada (official and lingua franca); Persian (official from 1761 to 1799); Hindustani (court and literary purposes)
- Religion: Hinduism (official) (Note: except for 1761-1799); Islam; Christianity; Jainism; Buddhism; Sikhism; Judaism
- Demonym: Mysorean
- Government: Monarchy
- Maharaja
  - 1399–1423 (first): Yaduraya Wodeyar
  - 1940–1950 (last): Jayachamaraja Wodeyar
  - 1761–1782: Hyder Ali
  - 1782–1799: Tipu Sultan
- Dewan
  - 1782–1811 (first): Purnaiah
  - 1946–1949 (last): Arcot Ramasamy Mudaliar
- History
  - Established: 1399
  - Earliest records: 1551
  - Anglo-Mysore Wars: 1767–1799
  - Maratha–Mysore War: 1759–1787
  - Accession to India: 1950 (Note: 1761-1799: Sultanate of Mysore ruled by Hyder Ali and Tipu Sultan)
Preceded by	Succeeded by
Vijayanagara Empire	Mysore State
- Today part of: India

The Kingdom of Mysore was a geopolitical realm in southern India founded in around 1399 in the vicinity of the modern-day city of Mysuru. Existing until 1950, the territorial boundaries and the form of government transmuted substantially throughout the kingdom's lifetime. While originally a feudal vassal under the Vijayanagara Empire, it became a princely state in the British Raj from 1799 to 1947, marked in-between by major political changes.

The kingdom, which was founded and ruled for the most part by the Wadiyars, initially served as a feudal vassal under the Vijayanagara Empire. With the gradual decline of the Empire, the 16th-century Timmaraja Wodeyar II declared independence from it. The 17th century saw a steady expansion of its territory and, during the rules of Narasaraja Wodeyar I and Devaraja Wodeyar II, the kingdom annexed large expanses of what is now southern Karnataka and parts of Tamil Nadu, becoming a formidable power in the Deccan.

During the Muslim rule from 1761 to 1799, the kingdom became a sultanate under Hyder Ali and Tipu, often referring to it as Sultanat-e-Khudadad (transl. God gifted empire). During this time, it came into conflict with the Maratha Confederacy, the Nizam of Hyderabad, the Kingdom of Travancore, and the British, culminating in four Anglo-Mysore Wars. Mysore's success in the First Anglo-Mysore war and a stalemate in the Second were followed by defeats in the Third and the Fourth. Following Tipu's death in the Fourth War during the Siege of Seringapatam, large parts of his kingdom were annexed by the British, which signalled the end of a period of Mysorean hegemony over South India. Power returned absolutely to the Wadiyars when Krishnaraja Wodeyar III became king.

In 1831, the British took direct control of the kingdom and a commission administered it until 1881. Through an instrument of rendition, power was once again transferred to the Wadiyars in 1881, when Chamaraja Wadiyar X was made king. In 1913, in lieu of the instrument, a proper subsidiary alliance was struck with the kingdom during Maharaja Krishnaraja Wadiyar IV.

Upon India's independence from the Crown rule in 1947, the Kingdom of Mysore acceded to the Union of India. Upon accession, it became Mysore State, later uniting with other Kannada speaking regions to form the present-day Karnataka state. Soon after Independence, Maharaja Jayachamaraja Wadiyar was made Rajapramukh until 1956, when he became the first governor of the enlarged state.

Even as a princely state, Mysore came to be counted among the more developed and urbanised regions of South Asia. The period since the penultimate restoration (1799–1947) also saw Mysore emerge as one of the important centres of art and culture in India. The maharajas of Mysore were not only accomplished exponents of the fine arts and men of letters, they were enthusiastic patrons as well. Their legacies continue to influence music and the arts even today, as well as rocket science with the use of Mysorean rockets.

== History ==
=== Early history ===
Sources for the history of the kingdom include numerous extant lithic and copper plate inscriptions, records from the Mysore palace and contemporary literary sources in Kannada, Persian and other languages. According to traditional accounts, the kingdom originated as a small state based in the modern city of Mysore and was founded by two brothers, Yaduraya (also known as Vijaya) and Krishnaraya. Their origins are mired in legend and are still a matter of debate; while some historians posit a northern origin at Dwarka, others locate it in Karnataka. Yaduraya is said to have married Chikkadevarasi, the local princess and assumed the feudal title "Wodeyar" (Kannada: ಒಡೆಯರ್, romanized: Oḍeyar, lit. 'lord'), which the ensuing dynasty retained. The first unambiguous mention of the Wodeyar family is in 16th century Kannada literature from the reign of the Vijayanagara king Achyuta Deva Raya (1529–1542); the earliest available inscription, issued by the Wodeyars themselves, dates to the rule of the petty chief Timmaraja II in 1551.

=== Autonomy: advances and reversals ===
The kings who followed ruled as vassals of the Vijayanagara Empire until the decline of the latter in 1565. By this time, the kingdom had expanded to thirty-three villages protected by a force of 300 soldiers. King Timmaraja II conquered some surrounding chiefdoms, and King Bola Chamaraja IV (lit, "Bald"), the first ruler of any political significance among them, withheld tribute to the nominal Vijayanagara monarch Aravidu Ramaraya. After the death of Aravidu Ramaraya, the Wodeyars began to assert themselves further and King Raja Wodeyar I wrested control of Srirangapatna from the Vijayanagara governor (Mahamandaleshvara) Aravidu Tirumalla – a development which elicited, if only ex post facto, the tacit approval of Venkatapati Raya, the incumbent king of the diminished Vijayanagar Empire ruling from Chandragiri. Raja Wodeyar I's reign also saw territorial expansion with the annexation of Channapatna to the north from Jaggadeva Raya – a development which made Mysore a regional political factor to reckon with.

Consequently, by 1612–13, the Wodeyars exercised a great deal of autonomy and even though they acknowledged the nominal overlordship of the Aravidu dynasty, tributes and transfers of revenue to Chandragiri stopped. This was in marked contrast to other major chiefs, the Nayaks of Tamil country who continued to pay off Chandragiri emperors well into the 1630s. Chamaraja VI and Kanthirava Narasaraja I attempted to expand further northward but were thwarted by the Bijapur Sultanate and its Maratha subordinates, though the Bijapur armies under Ranadullah Khan were effectively repelled in their 1638 siege of Srirangapatna. Expansionist ambitions then turned southward into Tamil country where Narasaraja Wodeyar acquired Satyamangalam (in modern northern Erode district) while his successor Dodda Devaraja Wodeyar expanded further to capture western Tamil regions of Erode and Dharmapuri, after successfully repulsing the chiefs of Madurai. The invasion of the Keladi Nayakas of Malnad was also dealt with successfully. This period was followed by one of the complex geo-political changes when in the 1670s, the Marathas and the Mughals pressed into the Deccan.

Chikka Devaraja (r. 1672–1704), the most notable of Mysore's early kings, who ruled during much of this period, managed to not only survive the exigencies but further expand territory. He achieved this by forging strategic alliances with the Marathas and the Mughals. The kingdom soon grew to include Salem and Bangalore to the east, Hassan to the west, Chikkamagaluru and Tumkur to the north and the rest of Coimbatore to the south. Despite this expansion, the kingdom, which now accounted for a fair share of land in the southern Indian heartland, extending from the Western Ghats to the western boundaries of the Coromandel plain, remained landlocked without direct coastal access. Chikka Devaraja's attempts to remedy this brought Mysore into conflict with the Nayaka chiefs of Ikkeri and the kings (Rajas) of Kodagu (modern Coorg); who between them controlled the Kanara coast (coastal areas of modern Karnataka) and the intervening hill region respectively. The conflict brought mixed results with Mysore annexing Periyapatna but suffering a reversal at Palupare.

Nevertheless, from around 1704, when the kingdom passed on to the "Mute king" (Mukarasu) Kanthirava Narasaraja II, the survival and expansion of the kingdom was achieved by playing a delicate game of alliance, negotiation, subordination on occasion, and annexation of territory in all directions. According to historians Sanjay Subrahmanyam and Sethu Madhava Rao, Mysore was now formally a tributary of the Mughal Empire. Mughul records claim a regular tribute (peshkash) was paid by Mysore. However, historian Suryanath U. Kamath feels the Mughals may have considered Mysore an ally, a situation brought about by Mughal–Maratha competition for supremacy in southern India. By the 1720s, with the Mughal empire in decline, further complications arose with the Mughal residents at both Arcot and Sira claiming tribute. The years that followed saw Krishnaraja Wodeyar I tread cautiously on the matter while keeping the Kodagu chiefs and the Marathas at bay. He was followed by Chamaraja Wodeyar VII during whose reign power fell into the hands of prime minister (Dalwai or Dalavoy) Nanjarajiah (or Nanjaraja) and chief minister (Sarvadhikari) Devarajiah (or Devaraja), the influential brothers from Kalale town near Nanjangud who would rule for the next three decades with the Wodeyars relegated to being the titular heads. The latter part of the rule of Krishnaraja II saw the Deccan Sultanates being eclipsed by the Mughals and in the confusion that ensued, Hyder Ali, a captain in the army, rose to prominence. His victory against the Marathas at Bangalore in 1758, resulting in the annexation of their territory, made him an iconic figure. In honour of his achievements, the king gave him the title "Nawab Haider Ali Khan Bahadur".

=== Under Hyder Ali and Tipu Sultan ===
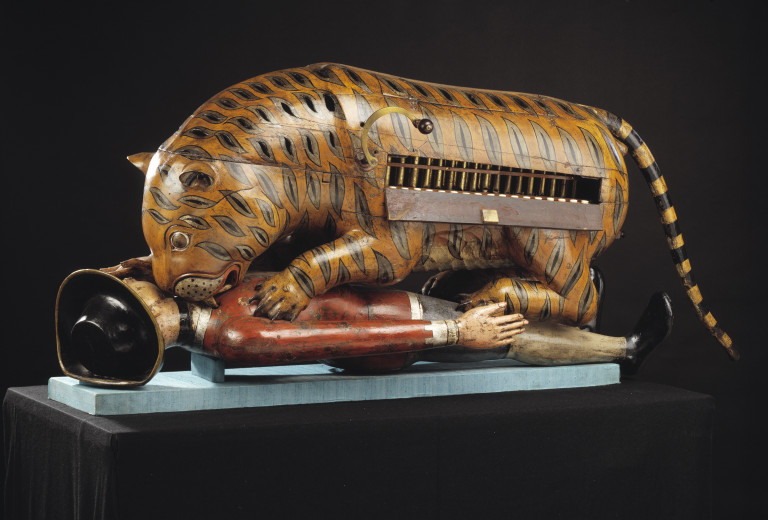
Tipu's Tiger with the organ keyboard visible

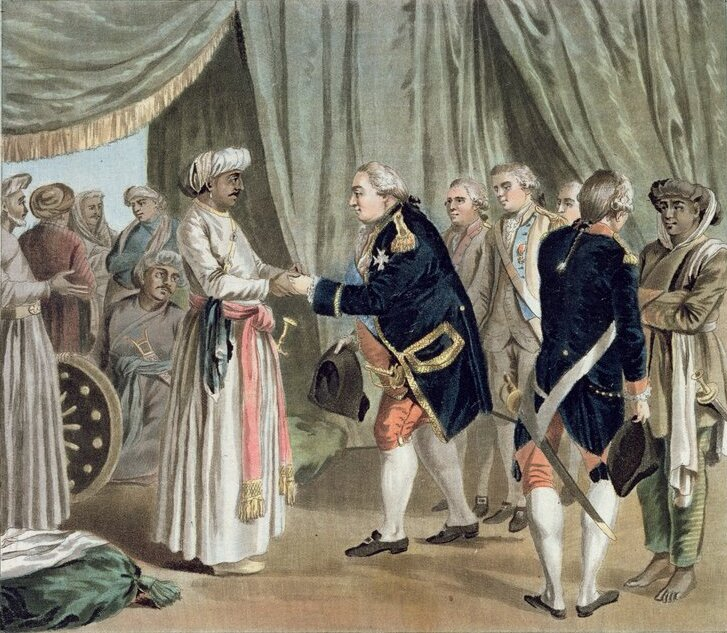
Admiral Suffren meeting with ally Hyder Ali in 1783. J. B. Morret engraving, 1789

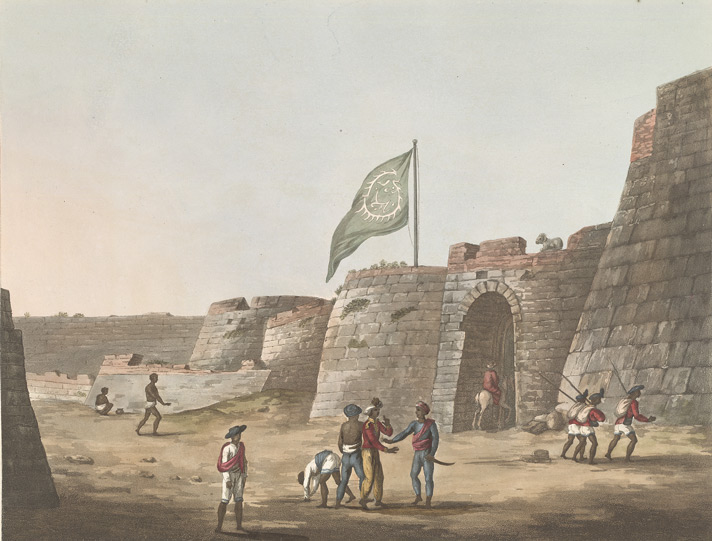
Tipu's flag at the entrance to the fort of Bangalore

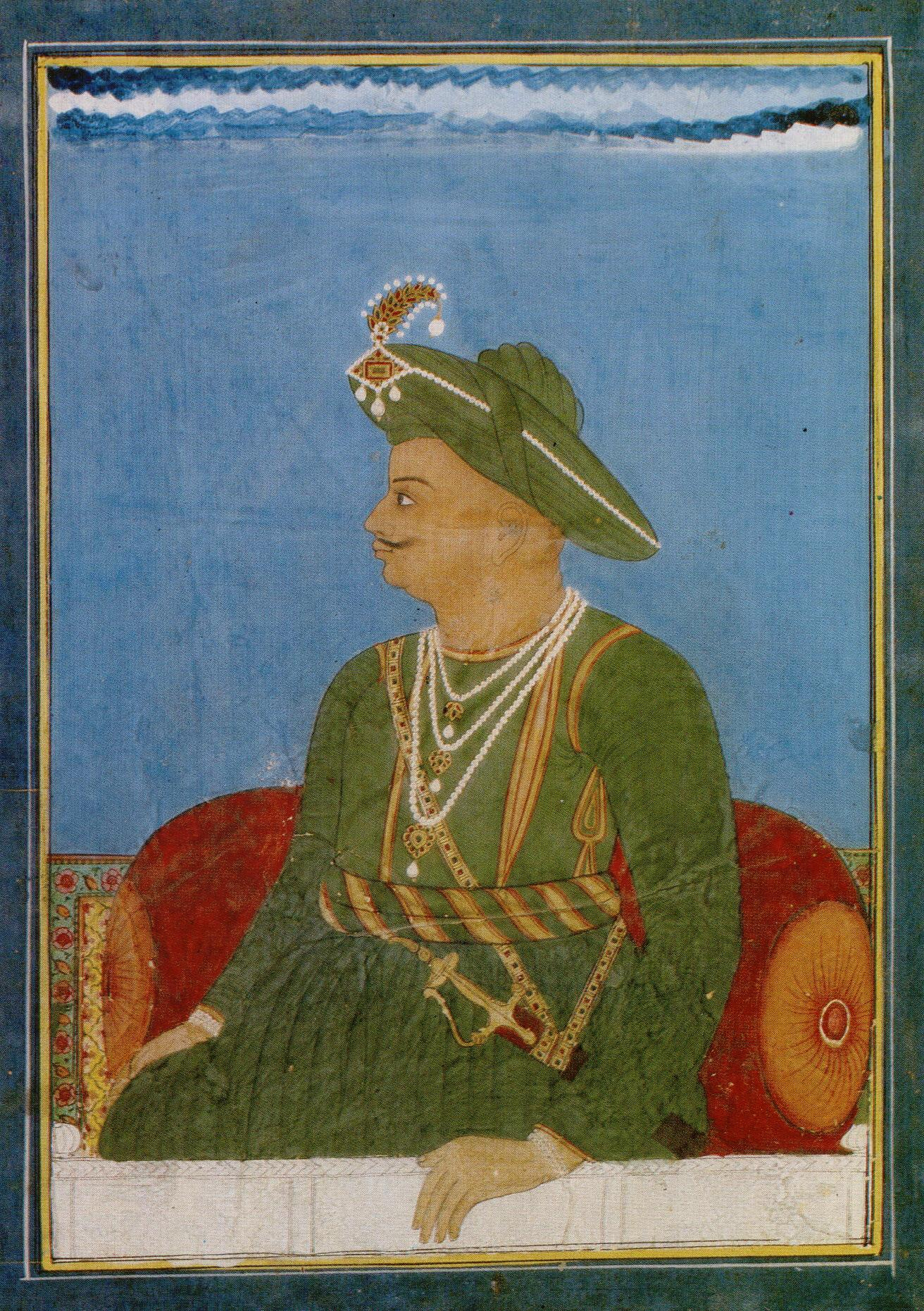
A portrait of Tipu Sultan, made during the Third Anglo-Mysore War

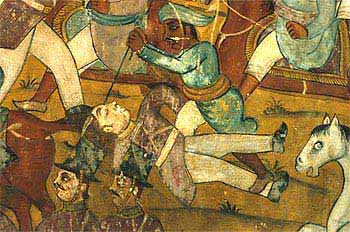
Mural of the Battle of Pollilur in Tipu Sultan's summer palace in Srirangapatna

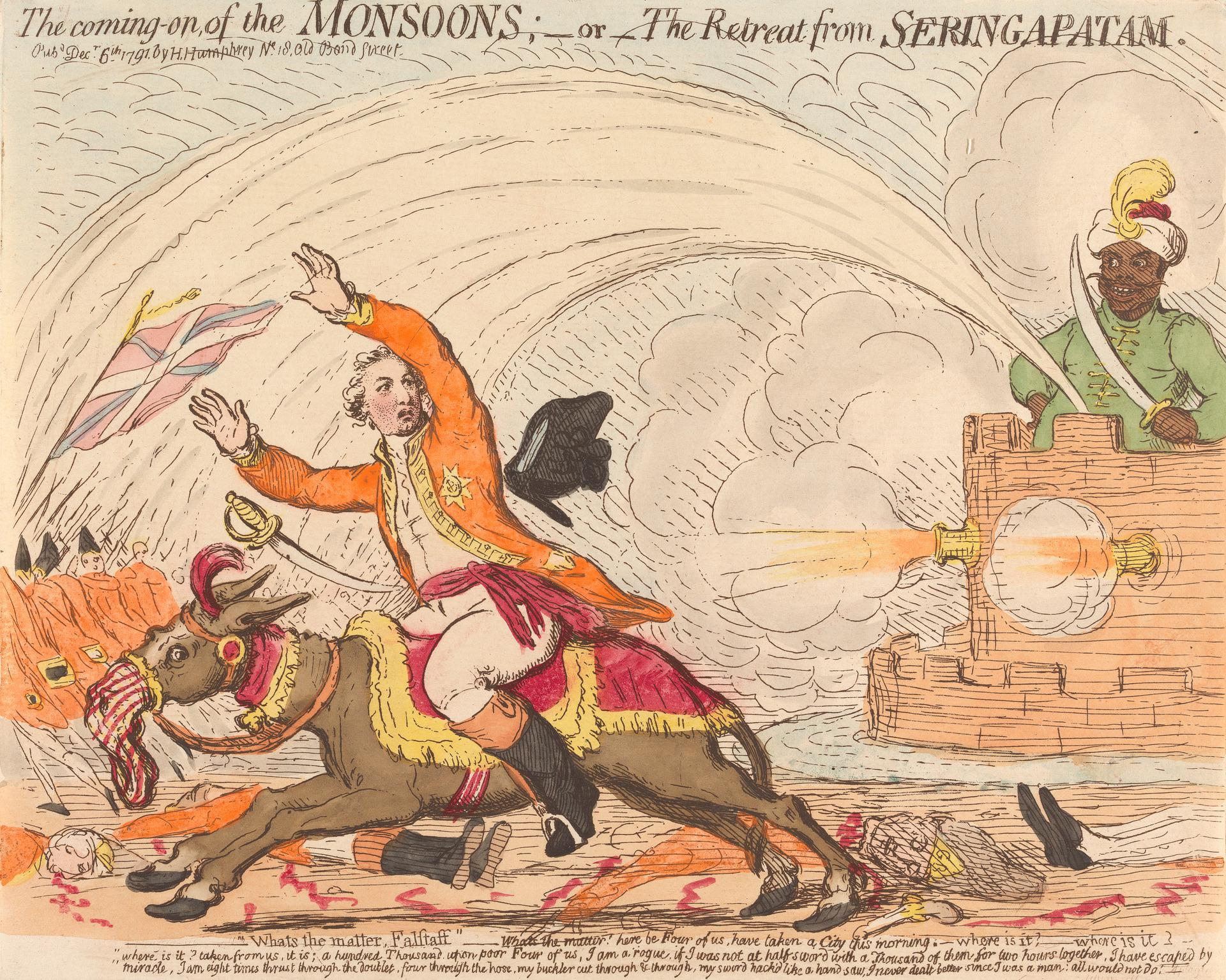
Cartoon mocking Lord Cornwallis for retreating from Seringapatam

Hyder Ali has earned an important place in the history of Karnataka for his fighting skills and administrative acumen. The rise of Hyder came at a time of important political developments in the sub-continent. While the European powers were busy transforming themselves from trading companies to political powers, the Nizam as the Subahdar of the Mughals pursued his ambitions in the Deccan, and the Marathas, following their defeat at Panipat, sought safe havens in the south. The period also saw the French vie with the British for control of the Carnatic—a contest in which the British would eventually prevail as British commander Sir Eyre Coote decisively defeated the French under the Comte de Lally at the Battle of Wandiwash in 1760, a watershed in Indian history as it cemented British supremacy in South Asia. Though the Wodeyars remained the nominal heads of Mysore during this period, real power lay in the hands of Hyder Ali and his son Tipu.

By 1761, Maratha power had diminished and by 1763, Hyder Ali had captured the Keladi kingdom, defeated the rulers of Bilgi, Bednur and Gutti, invaded the Malabar Coast in the south and conquered the Zamorin's capital Calicut with ease in 1766 and extended the Mysore kingdom up to Dharwad and Bellary in the north. Mysore was now a major political power in the subcontinent and Haider's meteoric rise from relative obscurity and his defiance formed one of the last remaining challenges to complete British hegemony over the Indian subcontinent—a challenge which would take them more than three decades to overcome.

In a bid to stem Hyder's rise, the British allied with the Marathas and the Nizam of Golconda, culminating in the First Anglo-Mysore War in 1767. Despite numerical superiority, Hyder Ali suffered defeats at the battles of Chengham and Tiruvannamalai. The British ignored his overtures for peace until Hyder Ali had strategically moved his armies to within five miles of Madras (modern Chennai) and was able to successfully sue for peace. Three wars were fought from 1764 and 1772 between the Maratha armies of Peshwa Madhavrao I against Hyder, in which Hyder was severely defeated and had to pay 36 lacs of tribute as war expenses along with an annual tribute of 14 lacs every year to the peshwa. In these wars Hyder had expected British support as per the 1769 treaty but the British stayed out of the conflict. British neutrality and Hyder's subsequent defeat reinforced his deep distrust of the British—a sentiment that would be shared by his son and one that would inform Anglo-Mysore rivalries of the next three decades. In 1777, Haider Ali recovered the previously lost territories of Coorg and parts of what would later become Malabar District from the Marathas. Haider Ali's army advanced towards the Marathas and fought them at the Battle of Saunshi and came out victorious during the same year.

By 1779, Hyder Ali had captured parts of modern Tamil Nadu and Kerala in the south, extending the kingdom's area to about 80,000 mi^{2} (205,000 km^{2}). In 1780, he befriended the French and made peace with the Marathas and the Nizam. However, Hyder Ali was betrayed by the Marathas and the Nizam, who made treaties with the British as well. In July 1779, Hyder Ali headed an army of 80,000, mostly cavalry, descending through the passes of the Ghats amid burning villages, before laying siege to British forts in northern Arcot starting the Second Anglo-Mysore War. Hyder Ali had some initial successes against the British notably at Pollilur, where Mysorean troops made effective use of rocket artillery, and Arcot, until the arrival of Sir Eyre Coote, when the fortunes of the British began to change. On 1 June 1781 Coote struck the first heavy blow against Hyder Ali in the decisive Battle of Porto Novo. The battle was won by Coote against odds of five to one and is regarded as one of the greatest feats of the British in India. It was followed up by another hard-fought battle at Pollilur (the scene of an earlier triumph of Hyder Ali over a British force) on 27 August, in which the British won another success, and by the rout of the Mysore troops at Sholinghur a month later. Hyder Ali died on 7 December 1782, even as fighting continued with the British. He was succeeded by his son Tipu Sultan who continued hostilities against the British by recapturing Baidanur and Mangalore.

By 1783 neither the British nor Mysore were able to obtain a clear overall victory. The French withdrew their support of Mysore following the peace settlement in Europe. Undaunted, Tipu, popularly known as the "Tiger of Mysore", continued the war against the British but lost some regions in modern coastal Karnataka to them. The Maratha–Mysore War occurred between 1785 and 1787 and consisted of a series of conflicts between the Sultanate of Mysore and the Maratha Empire. Following Tipu Sultan's victory against the Marathas at the siege of Bahadur Benda, a peace agreement was signed between the two kingdoms with mutual gains and losses. Similarly, the treaty of Mangalore was signed in 1784 bringing hostilities with the British to a temporary and uneasy halt and restoring the others' lands to the status quo ante bellum. The treaty is an important document in the history of India because it was the last occasion when an Indian power dictated terms to the British, who were made to play the role of humble supplicants for peace. A start of fresh hostilities between the British and French in Europe would have been sufficient reason for Tipu to abrogate his treaty and further his ambition of striking at the British. His attempts to lure the Nizam, the Marathas, the French and the Sultan of Turkey failed to bring direct military aid.

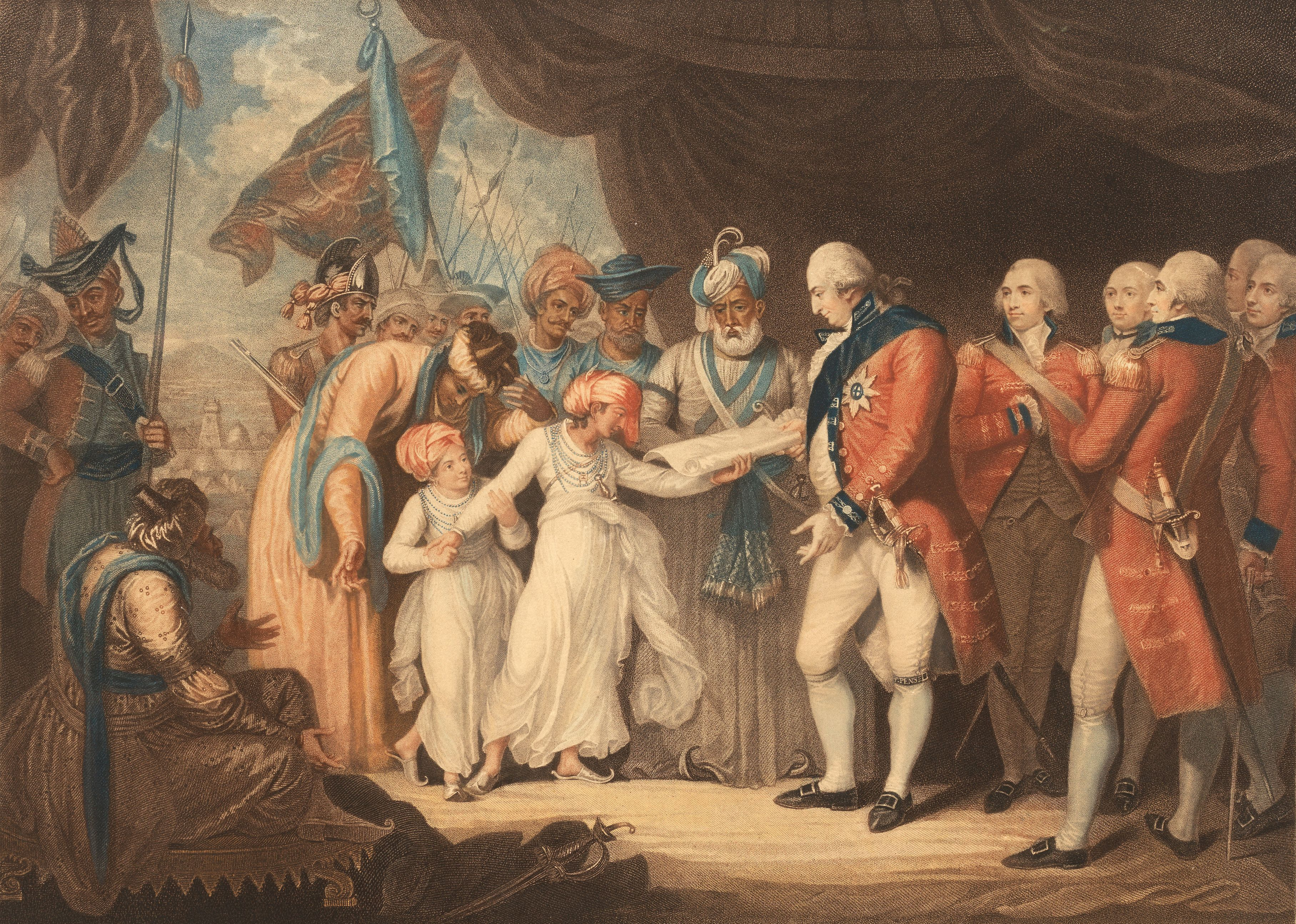
General Lord Cornwallis receiving Tipu Sultan's sons as hostages.

Tipu's successful attacks in 1790 on the Kingdom of Travancore, a later British ally, ended in defeat for him, and it resulted in greater hostilities with the British which culminated in the Third Anglo-Mysore War. In the beginning, the British made gains, taking the Coimbatore district, but Tipu's counterattack reversed many of these gains. By 1792, with aid from the Marathas who attacked from the north-west and the Nizam who moved in from the north-east, the British under Lord Cornwallis successfully besieged Srirangapatna, resulting in Tipu's defeat and the Treaty of Srirangapatna. Half of Mysore was distributed among the allies, and two of his sons were held to ransom. A humiliated but indomitable Tipu went about rebuilding his economic and military power. He attempted to covertly win over support from Revolutionary France, the Amir of Afghanistan, the Ottoman Empire and Arabia. However, these attempts to involve the French soon became known to the British, who were at the time fighting the French in Egypt and were backed by the Marathas and the Nizam. In 1799, Tipu died defending Srirangapatna in the Fourth Anglo-Mysore War, heralding the end of the kingdom's independence. Modern Indian historians consider Tipu Sultan an inveterate enemy of the British, an able administrator and an innovator.

=== Princely state ===
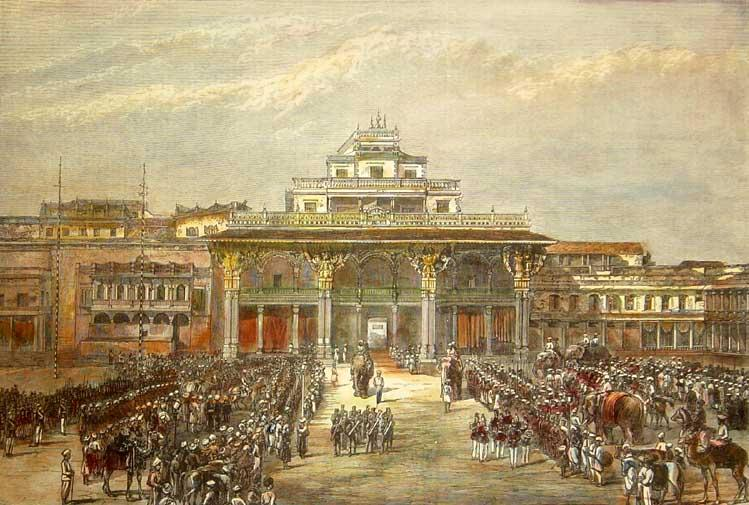
"Palace of the Maharajah of Mysore, India," from the Illustrated London News, 1881 (with modern hand coloring)

Following Tipu's fall, a part of the Kingdom of Mysore was annexed and divided between the Madras Presidency and the Nizam. The remaining territory was transformed into a Princely State; the five-year-old scion of the Wodeyar family, Krishnaraja III, was installed on the throne with Purnaiah continuing as Dewan, who had earlier served under Tipu, handling the reins as regent and Barry Close was appointed the British Resident for Mysore. The British then took control of Mysore's foreign policy and also exacted an annual tribute and a subsidy for maintaining a standing British army at Mysore. As dewan, Purnaiah distinguished himself with his progressive and innovative administration until he retired from service in 1811 (and died shortly thereafter) following the 16th birthday of the boy king.

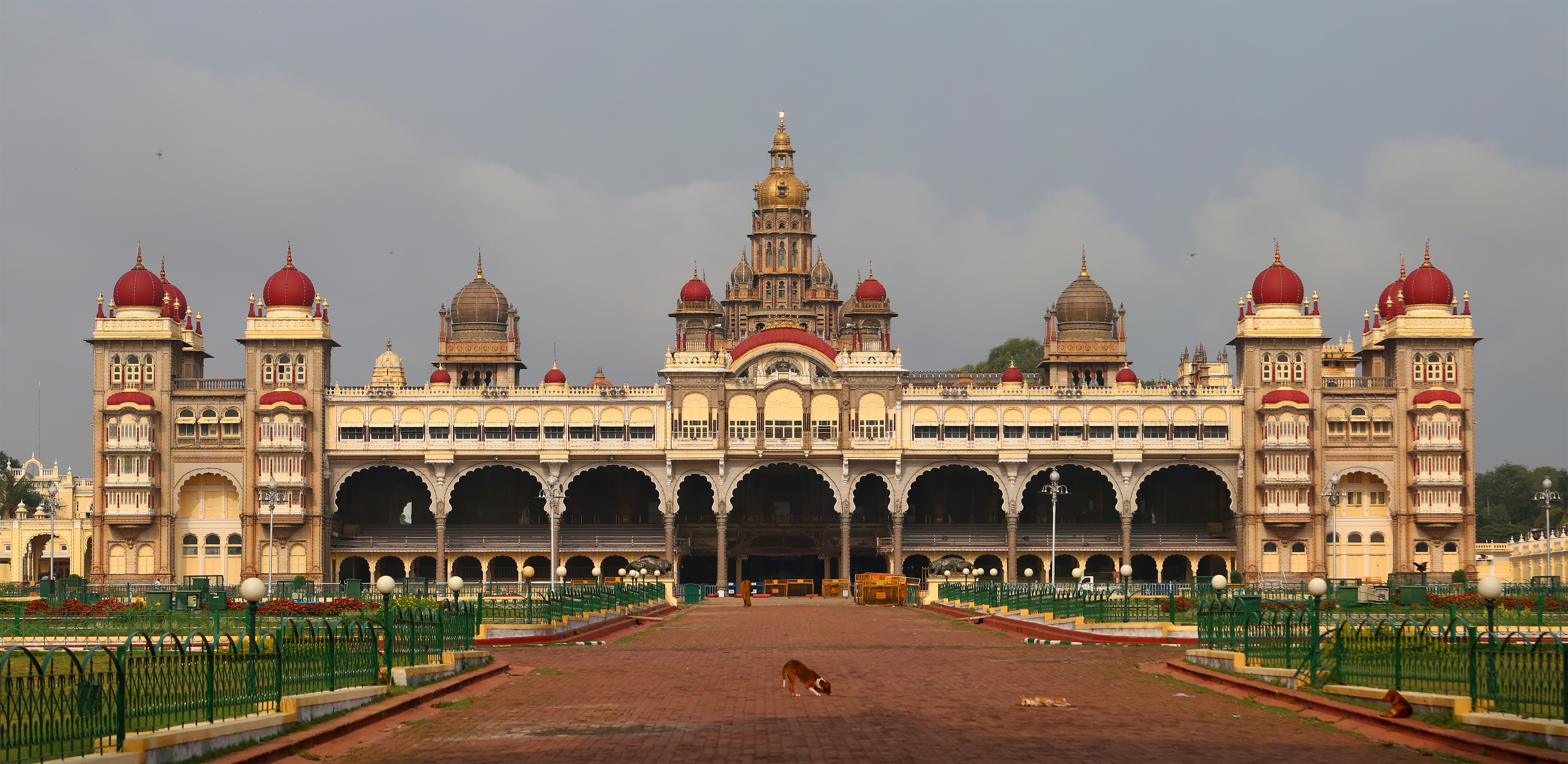
Mysore Palace built between 1897 and 1912

The years that followed witnessed cordial relations between Mysore and the British until things began to sour in the 1820s. Even though the Governor of Madras, Thomas Munro, determined after a personal investigation in 1825 that there was no substance to the allegations of financial impropriety made by A. H. Cole, the incumbent Resident of Mysore, the Nagar revolt (a civil insurrection) which broke out towards the end of the decade changed things considerably. In 1831, close on the heels of the insurrection and citing mal-administration, the British took direct control of the princely state, placing it under a commission rule. For the next fifty years, Mysore passed under the rule of successive British Commissioners; Sir Mark Cubbon, renowned for his statesmanship, served from 1834 until 1861 and put into place an efficient and successful administrative system which left Mysore a well-developed state.

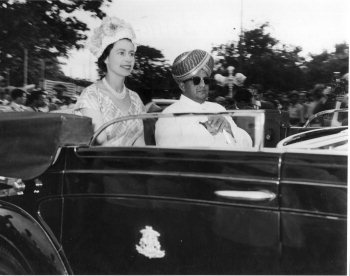
Jayachamrajendra Wadiyar with Elizabeth II

In 1876–77, however, towards the end of the period of direct British rule, Mysore was struck by a devastating famine with estimated mortality figures ranging between 700,000 and 1,100,000, or nearly a fifth of the population. Shortly thereafter, Maharaja Chamaraja X, educated in the British system, took over the rule of Mysore in 1881, following the success of a lobby set up by the Wodeyar dynasty that was in favour of rendition. Accordingly, a resident British officer was appointed at the Mysore court and a Dewan to handle the Maharaja's administration. From then onwards, until Indian independence in 1947, Mysore remained a Princely State within the British Indian Empire, with the Wodeyars continuing their rule.

After the demise of Maharaja Chamaraja X, Krishnaraja IV, still a boy of eleven, ascended the throne in 1895. His mother Maharani Kemparajammanniyavaru ruled as regent until Krishnaraja took over the reins on 8 February 1902. Under his rule, with Sir M. Visvesvayara as his Dewan, the Maharaja set about transforming Mysore into a progressive and modern state, particularly in industry, education, agriculture and art. Such were the strides that Mysore made that Mahatma Gandhi called the Maharaja a "saintly king" (Rajarishi). Paul Brunton, the British philosopher and orientalist, John Gunther, the American author, and British statesman Lord Samuel praised the ruler's efforts. Much of the pioneering work in educational infrastructure that took place during this period would serve Karnataka invaluably in the coming decades. The Maharaja was an accomplished musician, and like his predecessors, avidly patronised the development of the fine arts. He was followed by his nephew Jayachamarajendra whose rule continued for some years after he signed the instrument of accession and Mysore joined the Indian Union on 9 August 1947. Jayachamarajendra continued to rule as Rajapramukh of Mysore until 1956 when as a result of the States Reorganisation Act, 1956, his position was converted into Governor of Mysore State. From 1963 until 1966, he was the first Governor of Madras State.

== Administration ==
There are no records relating to the administration of the Mysore territory during the Vijayanagara Empire's reign (1399–1565). Signs of a well-organised and independent administration appear from the time of Raja Wodeyar I who is believed to have been sympathetic towards peasants (raiyats) who were exempted from any increases in taxation during his time. The first sign that the kingdom had established itself in the area was the issuing of gold coins (Kanthirayi phanam) resembling those of the erstwhile Vijayanagara Empire during Narasaraja Wodeyar's rule.

The rule of Chikka Devaraja saw several reforms effected. Internal administration was remodelled to suit the kingdom's growing needs and became more efficient. A postal system came into being. Far-reaching financial reforms were also introduced. Several petty taxes were imposed in place of direct taxes, as a result of which the peasants were compelled to pay more by way of land tax. The king is said to have taken a personal interest in the regular collection of revenues the treasury burgeoned to 90,000,000 Pagoda (a unit of currency) – earning him the epithet "Nine crore Narayana" (Navakoti Narayana). In 1700, he sent an embassy to Aurangazeb's court bestowed upon him the title Jug Deo Raja and awarded permission to sit on the ivory throne. Following this, he founded the district offices (Attara Kacheri), the central secretariat comprising eighteen departments, and his administration was modelled on Mughal lines.

During Hyder Ali's rule, the kingdom was divided into five provinces (Asofis) of unequal size, comprising 171 taluks (Paraganas) in total. When Tipu Sultan became the de facto ruler, the kingdom, which encompassed 160,000 km^{2} (61,776 sq mi) (62,000 mi^{2}), was divided into 37 provinces and a total of 124 taluks (Amil). Each province had a governor (Asof), and one deputy governor. Each taluk had a headman called Amildar and a group of villages were in charge of a Patel. The central administration comprised six departments headed by ministers, each aided by an advisory council of up to four members.

When the princely state came under direct British rule in 1831, early commissioners Lushington, Briggs and Morrison were followed by Mark Cubbon, who took charge in 1834. He made Bangalore the capital and divided the princely state into four divisions, each under a British superintendent. The state was further divided into 120 taluks with 85 taluk courts, with all lower level administration in the Kannada language. The office of the commissioner had eight departments; revenue, post, police, cavalry, public works, medical, animal husbandry, judiciary and education. The judiciary was hierarchical with the commissioners' court at the apex, followed by the Huzur Adalat, four superintending courts and eight Sadar Munsiff courts at the lowest level. Lewin Bowring became the chief commissioner in 1862 and held the position until 1870. During his tenure, the property "Registration Act", the "Indian Penal Code" and "Code of Criminal Procedure" came into effect and the judiciary was separated from the executive branch of the administration. The state was divided into eight districts – Bangalore, Chitraldroog, Hassan, Kadur, Kolar, Mysore, Shimoga, and Tumkur.

After the rendition, C. V. Rungacharlu was made the Dewan. Under him, Mysore Representative Assembly- the first Representative Assembly of British India, with 144 members, was formed in 1881. He was followed by K. Seshadri Iyer in 1883 during whose tenure gold mining at the Kolar Gold Fields began, the Shivanasamudra hydroelectric project was initiated in 1899 (the first such major attempt in India) and electricity and drinking water (the latter through pipes) was supplied to Bangalore. Seshadri Iyer was followed by P. N. Krishnamurti, who created The Secretariat Manual to maintain records and the Co-operative Department in 1905, V. P. Madhava Rao who focussed on the conservation of forests and T. Ananda Rao, who finalised the Kannambadi Dam project.

Sir Mokshagundam Visvesvaraya, popularly known as the "Maker of Modern Mysore", holds a key place in the history of Karnataka. An engineer by education, he became the Dewan in 1909. Under his tenure, membership of the Mysore Legislative Assembly was increased from 18 to 24, and it was given the power to discuss the state budget. The Mysore Economic Conference was expanded into three committees; industry and commerce, education, and agriculture, with publications in English and Kannada. Important projects commissioned during his time included the construction of the Kannambadi Dam, the founding of the Mysore Iron Works at Bhadravathi, founding of the Mysore University in 1916, the University Visvesvaraya College of Engineering in Bangalore, the establishment of the Mysore state railway department and numerous industries in Mysore. In 1955, he was awarded the Bharat Ratna, India's highest civilian honour.

Sir Mirza Ismail took office as Dewan in 1926 and built on the foundation laid by his predecessor. Amongst his contributions were the expansion of the Bhadravathi Iron Works, the founding of a cement and paper factory in Bhadravathi and the launch of Hindustan Aeronautics Limited. A man with a penchant for gardens, he founded the Brindavan Gardens (Krishnaraja Sagar) and built the Kaveri River high-level canal to irrigate 120,000 acres (490 km^{2}) in modern Mandya district.

In 1939 Mandya District was carved out of Mysore District, bringing the number of districts in the state to nine.

== Economy ==
The vast majority of the people lived in villages and agriculture was their main occupation. The economy of the kingdom was based on agriculture. Grains, pulses, vegetables and flowers were cultivated. Commercial crops included sugarcane and cotton. The agrarian population consisted of landlords (vokkaliga, zamindar, heggadde) who tilled the land by employing several landless labourers, usually paying them in grain. Minor cultivators were also willing to hire themselves out as labourers if the need arose. It was due to the availability of these landless labourers that kings and landlords were able to execute major projects such as palaces, temples, mosques, anicuts (dams) and tanks. Because land was abundant and the population relatively sparse, no rent was charged on land ownership. Instead, landowners paid tax for cultivation, which amounted to up to one-half of all harvested produce.

=== Under Hyder Ali and Tipu Sultan ===
Tipu Sultan is credited with founding state trading depots in various locations of his kingdom. In addition, he founded depots in foreign locations such as Karachi, Jeddah and Muscat, where Mysore products were sold. During Tipu's rule French technology was used for the first time in carpentry and smithing, Chinese technology was used for sugar production, and technology from Bengal helped improve the sericulture industry. State factories were established in Kanakapura and Taramandelpeth for producing cannons and gunpowder respectively. The state held the monopoly in the production of essentials such as sugar, salt, iron, pepper, cardamom, betel nut, tobacco and sandalwood, as well as the extraction of incense oil from sandalwood and the mining of silver, gold and precious stones. Sandalwood was exported to China and the Persian Gulf countries and sericulture was developed in twenty-one centres within the kingdom.

The Mysore silk industry was initiated during the rule of Tipu Sultan. Later the industry was hit by a global depression and competition from imported silk and rayon. In the second half of the 20th century, it however revived and the Mysore State became the top multivoltine silk producer in India.

=== Under British rule ===
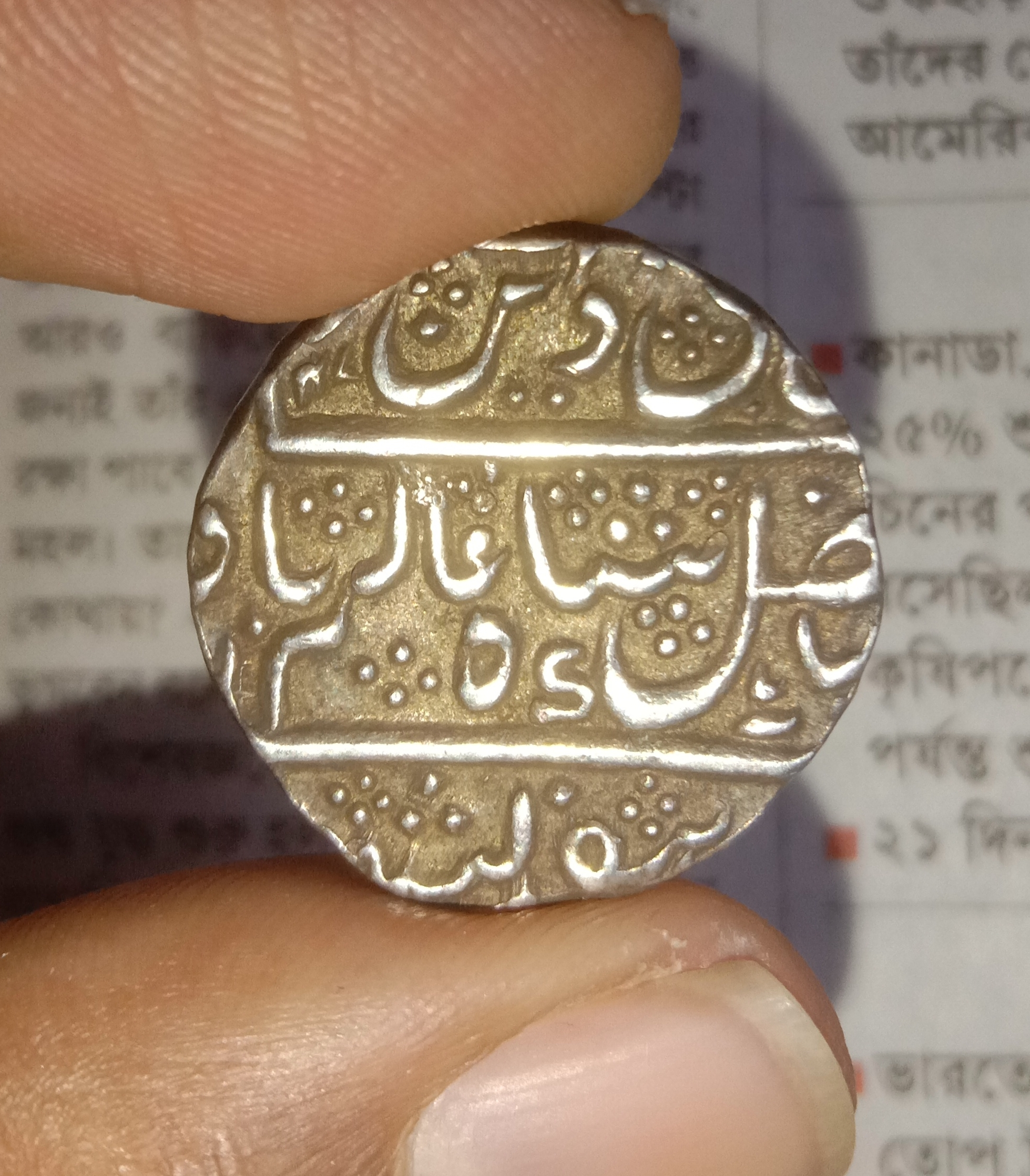
Silver Rupee of Krishna Raja Wodeyar III, Mysore State, struck in the name of Mughal emperor Shah Alam II, Zarb Mahisur Mint, AD 1805.

This system changed under the subsidiary alliance with the British, when tax payments were made in cash and were used for the maintenance of the army, police and other civil and public establishments. A portion of the tax was transferred to England as the "Indian tribute". Unhappy with the loss of their traditional revenue system and the problems they faced, peasants rose in rebellion in many parts of south India. After 1800, the Cornwallis land reforms came into effect. Reade, Munro, Graham and Thackeray were some administrators who improved the economic conditions of the masses. However, the homespun textile industry suffered while most of India was under British rule, except the producers of the finest cloth and the coarse cloth which was popular with the rural masses. This was due to the manufacturing mills of Manchester, Liverpool and Scotland being more than a match for the traditional handweaving industry, especially in spinning and weaving.

The economic revolution in England and the tariff policies of the British also caused massive de-industrialization in other sectors throughout British India and Mysore. For example, the gunny bag weaving business had been a monopoly of the Goniga people, which they lost when the British began ruling the area. The import of a chemical substitute for saltpetre (potassium nitrate) affected the Uppar community, the traditional makers of saltpetre for use in gunpowder. The import of kerosene affected the Ganiga community which supplied oils. Foreign enamel and crockery industries affected the native pottery business, and mill-made blankets replaced the country-made blankets called kambli. This economic fallout led to the formation of community-based social welfare organisations to help those within the community to cope better with their new economic situation, including youth hostels for students seeking education and shelter. However, the British economic policies created a class structure consisting of a newly established middle class comprising various blue and white-collared occupational groups, including agents, brokers, lawyers, teachers, civil servants and physicians. Due to a more flexible caste hierarchy, the middle class contained a heterogeneous mix of people from different castes.

== Culture ==
=== Religion ===
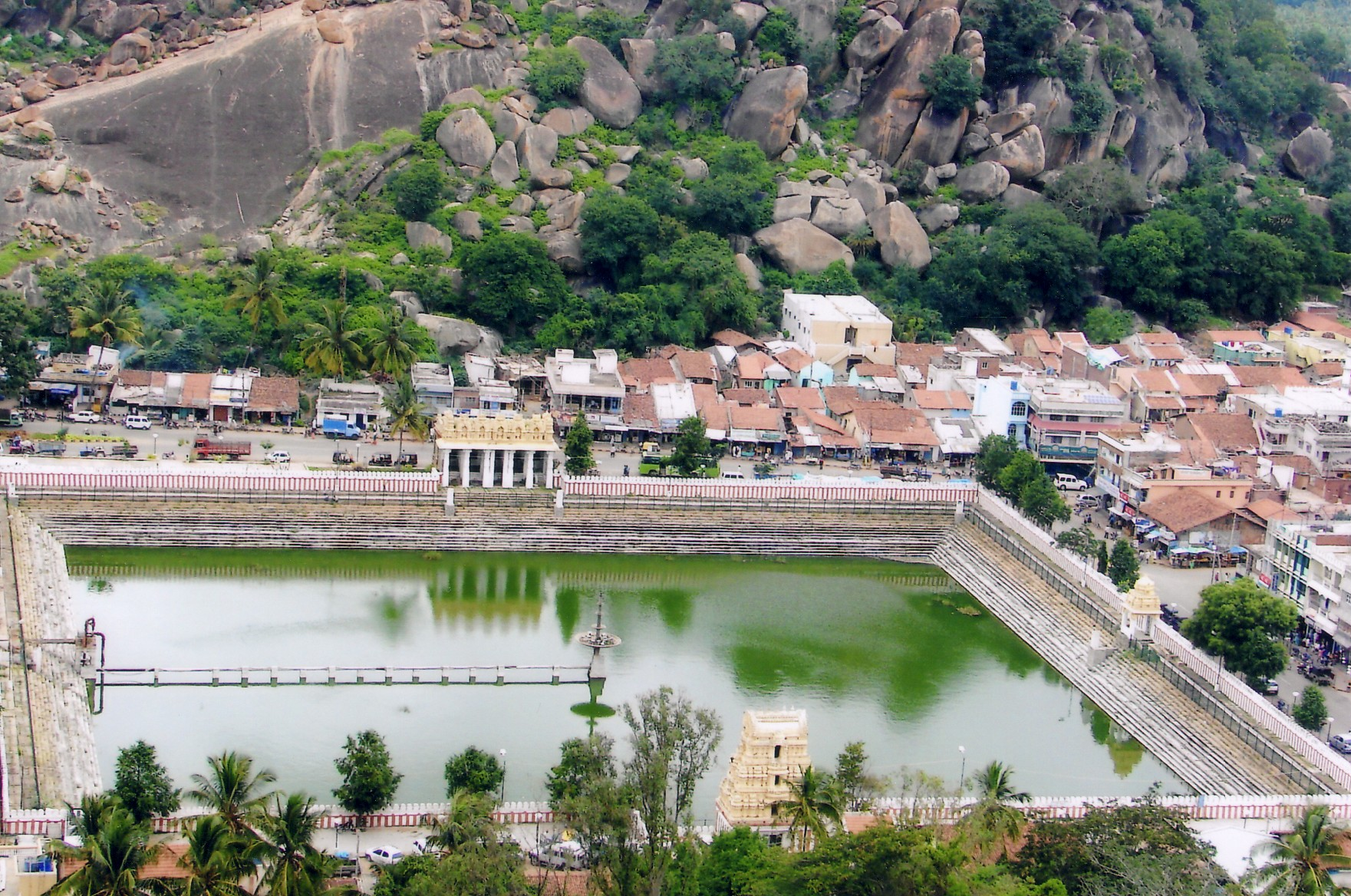
Temple pond constructed by King Chikka Devaraja Wodeyar at Shravanabelagola, an important Jain temple town

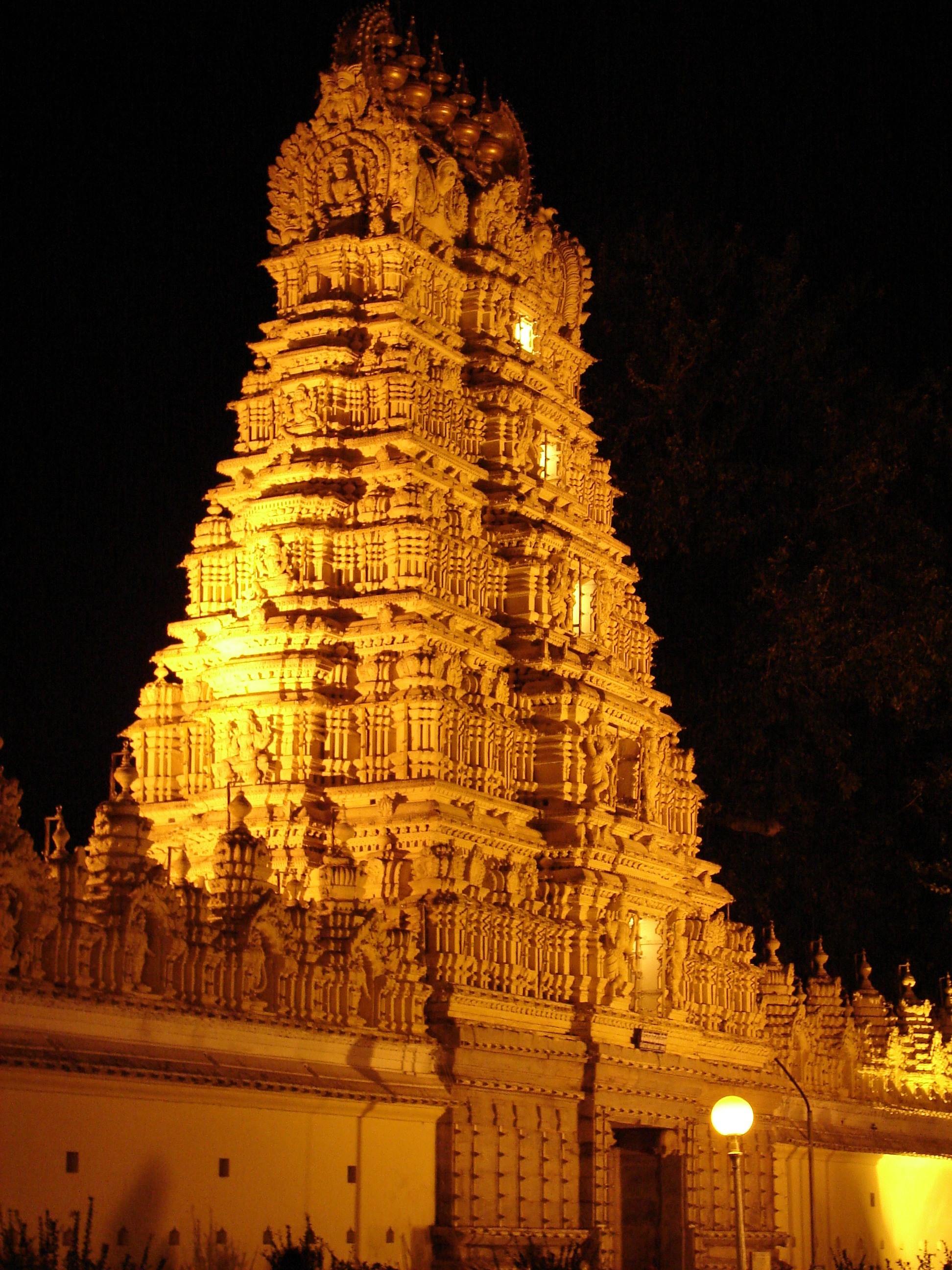
Shweta Varahaswamy temple (1673–1704) in the Mysore Palace grounds

The early kings of the Wodeyar dynasty were followers of Jainism. The later kings, starting from the 17th century, took to Vaishnavism, the worship of the Hindu god Vishnu and Shiva. According to musicologist Meera Rajaram Pranesh, King Raja Wodeyar I was a devotee of the god Vishnu, King Dodda Devaraja was honoured with the title "Protector of Brahmins" (Deva Brahmana Paripalaka) for his support to Brahmins, and Maharaja Krishnaraja III was devoted to the goddess Chamundeshwari (a form of Hindu goddess Durga). Wilks ("History of Mysore", 1800) wrote about a Jangama (Veerashaiva saint-devotee of Shiva) uprising, related to excessive taxation, which was put down firmly by Chikka Devaraja. Historian D.R. Nagaraj claims that four hundred Jangamas were murdered in the process but clarifies that Veerashaiva literature itself is silent about the issue. Historian Suryanath Kamath claims King Chikka Devaraja was a Srivaishnava (follower of Sri Vaishnavism, a sect of Vaishnavism) but was not anti-Veerashaiva. Historian Aiyangar concurs that some of the kings including the celebrated Narasaraja I and Chikka Devaraja were Vaishnavas, but suggests this may not have been the case with all Wodeyar rulers. The rise of the modern-day Mysore city as a centre of south Indian culture has been traced from the period of their sovereignty. Raja Wodeyar I initiated the celebration of the Dasara festival in Mysore, a proud tradition of the erstwhile Vijayanagara royal family.

Jainism, though in decline during the late medieval period, also enjoyed the patronage of the Mysore kings, who made munificent endowments to the Jain monastic order at the town of Shravanabelagola. Records indicate that some Wodeyar kings not only presided over the Mahamastakabhisheka ceremony, an important Jain religious event at Shravanabelagola, but also personally offered prayers (puja) during the years 1659, 1677, 1800, 1825, 1910, 1925, 1940, and 1953.

The contact between South India and Islam goes back to the 7th century when trade between Hindu kingdoms and Islamic caliphates thrived. These Muslim traders settled on the Malabar Coast with the permission and blessings of the Hindu Lords of those parts and married local Hindu women, and their descendants came to be known as Mappillas. By the 14th century, Muslims had become a significant minority in the south, though the advent of Portuguese missionaries checked their growth. Hyder Ali, though a devout Muslim, did not allow his faith to interfere with the administration of the predominantly Hindu kingdom ruled by Hindu kings. Historians are, however, divided on the intentions of Haider Ali's son, Tipu Sultan. It has been claimed that Tipu raised Hindus to prominent positions in his administration back in Mysore, made generous grants to Hindu temples and Brahmins, and generally respected other faiths and that any religious conversions that Tipu undertook were as punishment to those who rebelled against his authority. However, this has been countered by other historians who claim that Tipu Sultan treated the non-Muslims of Mysore far better than those of the Malabar Coast, Raichur and Kodagu regions. They point out that Tipu was responsible for mass conversions of Christians and Hindus in these regions by force.

=== Society ===
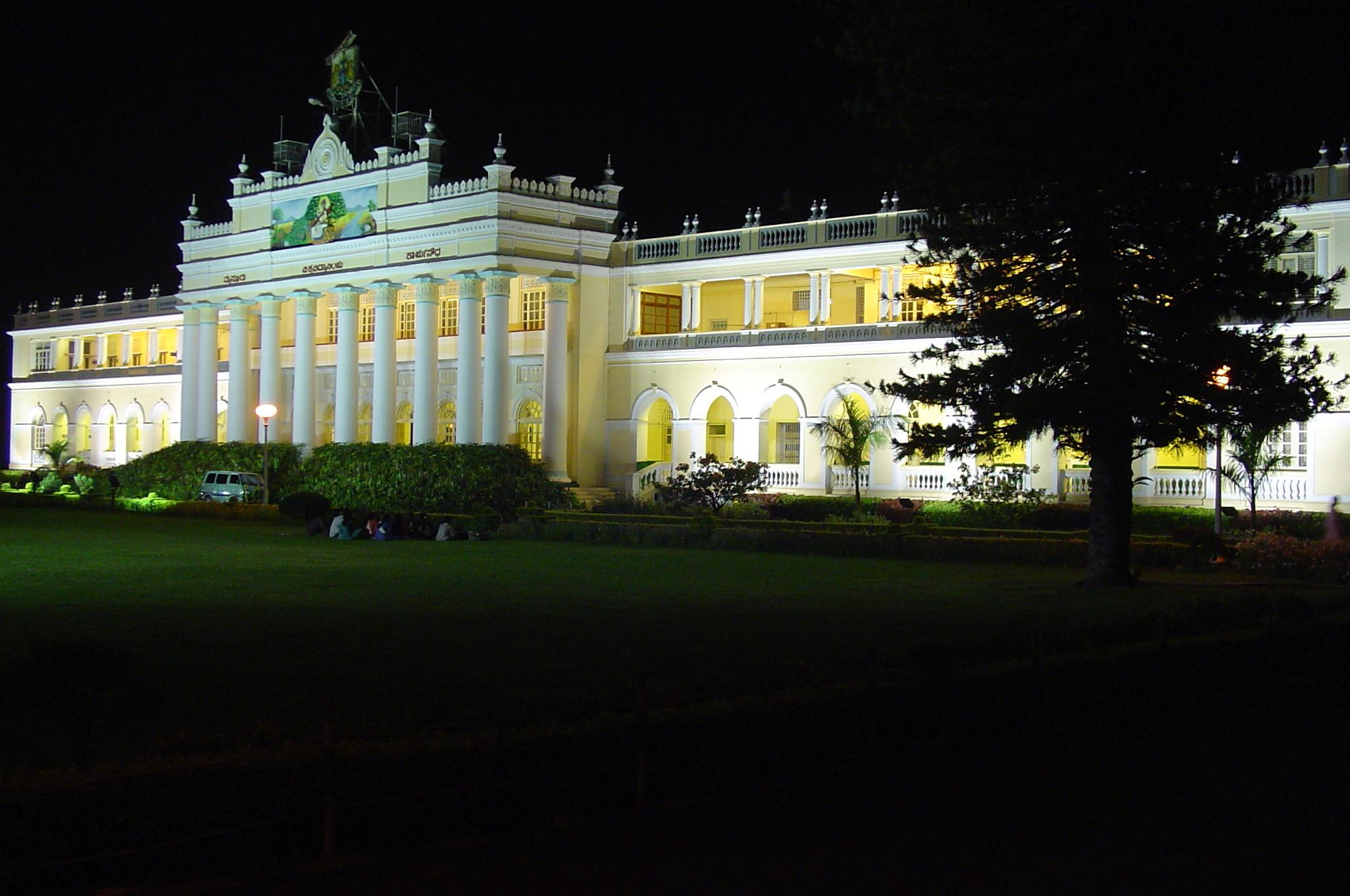
The Crawford Hall on Mysore University campus houses the university offices.

Before the 18th century, the society of the kingdom followed age-old and deeply established norms of social interaction between people. Accounts by contemporaneous travellers indicate the widespread practice of the Hindu caste system and animal sacrifices during the nine-day celebrations (called Mahanavami). Later, fundamental changes occurred due to the struggle between native and foreign powers. Though wars between the Hindu kingdoms and the Sultanates continued, the battles between native rulers (including Muslims) and the newly arrived British took centre stage. The spread of English education, the introduction of the printing press and the criticism of the prevailing social system by Christian missionaries helped make the society more open and flexible. The rise of modern nationalism throughout India also affected Mysore.

With the advent of British power, English education gained prominence in addition to traditional education in local languages. These changes were orchestrated by Lord Elphinstone, the governor of the Madras Presidency. His plan became the constitution of the central collegiate institution or University Board in 1841. Accordingly, a high school department of the university was established. For imparting education in the interior regions, schools were raised in principal towns which eventually were elevated to college level, with each college becoming central to many local schools (zilla schools). The earliest English-medium schools appeared in 1833 in Mysore and spread across the region. In 1858, the Department of Education was founded in Mysore and by 1881, there were an estimated 2,087 English-medium schools in the state of Mysore. Higher education became available with the formation of Bangalore Central College in Bangalore (1870), Maharaja's College (1879), Maharani's College (1901) and the Mysore University (1916) in Mysore and the St. Agnes College in Mangalore (1921).

Social reforms aimed at removing practices such as sati and social discrimination based upon untouchability, as well as demands for the emancipation of the lower classes, swept across India and influenced Mysore territory. In 1894, the kingdom passed laws to abolish the marriage of girls below the age of eight. Remarriage of widowed women and marriage of destitute women were encouraged, and in 1923, some women were granted permission to exercise their franchise in elections. There were, however, uprisings against British authority in the Mysore territory, notably the Kodagu uprising in 1835 (after the British dethroned the local ruler Chikkaviraraja) and the Kanara uprising of 1837. The era of printing heralded by Christian missionaries, notably Hermann Mögling, resulted in the founding of printing presses across the kingdom. The publication of ancient and contemporary Kannada books (such as the Pampa Bharata and the Jaimini Bharata), a Kannada-language Bible, a bilingual dictionary and a Kannada newspaper called Kannada Samachara began in the early 19th century. Aluru Venkata Rao published a consolidated Kannada history glorifying the achievements of Kannadigas in his book Karnataka Gatha Vaibhava.

Classical English and Sanskrit drama, and native Yakshagana musical theatre influenced the Kannada stage and produced famous dramatists like Gubbi Veeranna. The public began to enjoy Carnatic music through its broadcast via public address systems set up on the palace grounds. Mysore paintings, which were inspired by the Bengal Renaissance, were created by artists such as Sundarayya, Ala Singarayya, and B. Venkatappa.

=== Literature ===
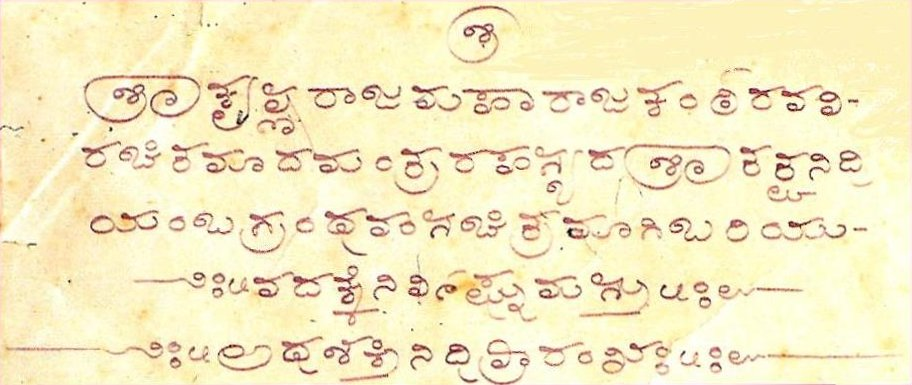
Opening page of the musical treatise Sritattvanidhi proclaiming Krishnaraja Wodeyar III as the author

The era of the kingdom of Mysore is considered a golden age in the development of Kannada literature. Not only was the Mysore court adorned by famous Brahmin and Veerashaiva writers and composers, the kings themselves were accomplished in the fine arts and made important contributions. While conventional literature in philosophy and religion remained popular, writings in new genres such as chronicle, biography, history, encyclopaedia, novel, drama, and musical treatise became popular. A native form of folk literature with dramatic representation called Yakshagana gained popularity. A remarkable development of the later period was the influence of English literature and classical Sanskrit literature on Kannada.

Govinda Vaidya, a native of Srirangapatna, wrote Kanthirava Narasaraja Vijaya, a eulogy of his patron King Narasaraja I. Written in sangatya metre (a composition meant to be rendered to the accompaniment of a musical instrument), the book describes the king's court, popular music and the types of musical compositions of the age in twenty-six chapters. King Chikka Devaraja was the earliest composer of the dynasty. To him is ascribed the famous treatise on music called Gita Gopala. Though inspired by Jayadeva's Sanskrit work Gita Govinda, it had an originality of its own and was written in saptapadi metre. Contemporary poets who left their mark on the entire Kannada-speaking region include the Brahmin poet Lakshmisa and the itinerant Veerashaiva poet Sarvajna. Female poets also played a role in literary developments, with Cheluvambe (the queen of Krishnaraja Wodeyar I), Helavanakatte Giriyamma, Sri Rangamma (1685) and Sanchi Honnamma (Hadibadeya Dharma, late 17th century) writing notable works.

A polyglot, King Narasaraja II authored fourteen Yakshaganas in various languages, though all are written in Kannada script. Maharaja Krishnaraja III was a prolific writer in Kannada for which he earned the honorific Abhinava Bhoja (a comparison to the medieval King Bhoja). Over forty writings are attributed to him, of which the musical treatise Sritattvanidhi and a poetical romance called Saugandika Parinaya written in two versions, a sangatya and a drama, are most well known. Under the patronage of the Maharaja, Kannada literature began its slow and gradual change towards modernity. Kempu Narayana's Mudramanjusha ("The Seal Casket", 1823) is the earliest work that has touches of modern prose. However, the turning point came with the historically important Adbhuta Ramayana (1895) and Ramaswamedham (1898) by Muddanna, whom the Kannada scholar Narasimha Murthy considers "a Janus like figure" of modern Kannada literature. Muddanna has deftly handled an ancient epic from an entirely modern viewpoint.

Basavappa Shastry, a native of Mysore and a luminary in the court of Maharaja Krishnaraja III and Maharaja Chamaraja X, is known as the "Grandfather of Kannada theatre" (Kannada Nataka Pitamaha). He authored dramas in Kannada and translated William Shakespeare's "Othello" to Shurasena Charite. His well-known translations from Sanskrit to Kannada are many and include Kalidasa and Abhijnana Shakuntala.

=== Music ===
Legendary Vainikas – Veene Subbanna and Veene Sheshanna (photographed in 1902)

Under Maharaja Krishnaraja III and his successors – Chamaraja X, Krishnaraja IV and the last ruler, Jayachamaraja, the Mysore court came to be the largest and most renowned patron of music. While the Tanjore and Travancore courts also extended great patronage and emphasised preservation of the art, the unique combination of royal patronage of individual musicians, the founding of music schools to kindle public interest and patronage of European music publishers and producers set Mysore apart. Maharaja Krishnaraja III, himself a musician and musicologist of merit, composed several javalis (light lyrics) and devotional songs in Kannada under the title Anubhava pancharatna. His compositions bear the pen name (mudra) "Chamundi'" or '"Chamundeshwari'", in honour of the Wodeyar family deity.

Under Krishnaraja IV, art received further patronage. A distinct school of music that gave importance to raga and bhava evolved. The Royal School of Music founded at the palace helped institutionalise teaching of the art. Carnatic compositions were printed and the European staff notation came to be employed by royal musicians. Western music was also encouraged – Margaret Cousins' piano concerto with the Palace Orchestra marked the celebrations of Beethoven's centenary in Bangalore. Maharaja Jayachamaraja, also a renowned composer of Carnatic kritis (a musical composition), sponsored a series of recordings of Russian composer Nikolai Medtner and others. The court ensured that Carnatic music also kept up with the times. Gramophone recordings of the palace band were made and sold commercially. Attention was paid to the "technology of the concert". Lavish sums were spent on acquiring various instruments including the unconventional horn violin, theremin and calliaphone, a mechanical music player.

The Mysore court was home to several renowned experts (vidwan) of the time. Veena Sheshanna, a court musician during the rule of Maharaja Chamaraja X, is considered one of the greatest exponents of the veena. His achievements in classical music won Mysore a premier place in the art of instrumental Carnatic music and he was given the honorific Vainika Shikhamani by Maharaja Krishnaraja Wodeyar IV. Mysore Vasudevacharya was a noted musician and composer in Sanskrit and Telugu from Mysore. He holds the unique distinction of being patronised by four generations of Mysore kings and rulers and for being court musician to three of them. H.L. Muthiah Bhagavatar was another musician-composer who adorned the Mysore court. Considered one of the most important composers of the post-Tyagaraja period, he is credited with about 400 compositions in Sanskrit, Kannada, Telugu and Tamil under the pen name "Harikesha". Among violinists, T. Chowdiah emerged as one of the most accomplished exponents of the time. He is known to have mastered the seven-stringed violin. Chowdiah was appointed court musician by Maharaja Krishnaraja Wodeyar IV in 1939 and received such titles as "Sangeeta Ratna" and "Sangeeta Kalanidhi". He is credited with compositions in Kannada, Telugu and Sanskrit under the pen name "Trimakuta".

== Architecture ==
The architectural style of courtly and royal structures in the kingdom underwent profound changes during British rule – a mingling of European traditions with native elements. The Hindu temples in the kingdom were built in typical South Indian Dravidian style – a modest version of the Vijayanagara building idiom. When in power, Tipu Sultan constructed two places namely Lal Mahal Palace (later destroyed after the siege of Serirangpatnam in 1799), the Summer Palace and the famous Masjid e Aala in Srirangapatna, his capital. However, it is the city of Mysore that is best known for its royal palaces, earning it the nickname "City of Palaces". The city's main palace, the Mysore Palace, is also known as the Amba Vilas Palace. The original complex was destroyed by fire and a new palace was commissioned by the Queen-Regent and designed by the English architect Henry Irwin in 1897. The overall design is a combination of Hindu, Islamic, Indo-Saracenic and Moorish styles, which for the first time in India, used cast iron columns and roof frames. The striking feature of the exterior is the granite columns that support cusped arches on the portico, a tall tower whose finial is a gilded dome with an umbrella (chattri) on it, and groups of other domes around it. The interior is richly decorated with marbled walls and a teakwood ceiling on which are sculptures of Hindu deities. The Durbar hall leads to an inner private hall through silver doors. This opulent room has floor panels that are inlaid with semi-precious stones, and a stained glass roof supported centrally by columns and arches. The marriage hall (Kalyana mantapa) in the palace complex is noted for its stained glass octagonal dome with peacock motifs.

The Lalitha Mahal Palace was built in 1921 by E. W. Fritchley under the commission of Maharaja Krishnaraja IV. The architectural style is called "Renaissance" and exhibits concepts from English manor houses and Italian palazzos. The central dome is believed to be modelled on St. Paul's Cathedral in London. Other important features are the Italian marble staircase, the polished wooden flooring in the banquet and dance halls, and the Belgian cut glass lamps. The Jaganmohan Palace was commissioned in 1861 and was completed in 1910. The three-storeyed building with attractive domes, finials and cupolas was the venue of many a royal celebration. It is now called the Chamarajendra Art Gallery and houses a rich collection of artefacts.

The Mysore University campus, also called "Manasa Gangotri", is home to several architecturally interesting buildings. Some of them are in European style and were completed in the late 19th century. They include the Jayalakshmi Vilas mansion, the Crawford Hall, the Oriental Research Institute (built between 1887 and 1891) with its Ionic and Corinthian columns, and the district offices (Athara Kutchery, 1887). The Athara Kutchery, which initially served as the office of the British commissioner, has an octagonal dome and a finial that adds to its beauty. The Maharaja's summer palace, built in 1880, is called the Lokaranjan Mahal and initially served as a school for royalty. The Rajendra Vilas Palace, built in the Indo-British style atop the Chamundi Hill, was commissioned in 1922 and completed in 1938 by Maharaja Krishnaraja IV. Other royal mansions built by the Mysore rulers were the Chittaranjan Mahal in Mysore and the Bangalore Palace in Bangalore, a structure built on the lines of England's Windsor Castle. The Central Food Technical Research Institute (Cheluvamba Mansion), built in baroque European renaissance style, was once the residence of princess Cheluvambaamani Avaru, a sister of Maharaja Krishnaraja IV. Its extensive pilaster work and mosaic flooring are noteworthy.

Most famous among the many temples built by the Wodeyars is the Chamundeshwari Temple atop the Chamundi Hill. The earliest structure here was consecrated in the 12th century and was later patronised by the Mysore rulers. Maharaja Krishnaraja III added a Dravidian-style gopuram in 1827. The temple has silver-plated doors with images of deities. Other images include those of the Hindu god Ganesha and of Maharaja Krishnaraja III with his three queens. Surrounding the main palace in Mysore and inside the fort are a group of temples, built in various periods. The Prasanna Krishnaswamy Temple (1829), the Lakshmiramana Swamy Temple whose earliest structures date to 1499, the Trinesvara Swamy Temple (late 16th century), the Shweta Varaha Swamy Temple built by Purnaiah with a touch of Hoysala style of architecture, the Prasanna Venkataramana Swami Temple (1836) notable for 12 murals of the Wodeyar rulers. Well-known temples outside Mysore city are the yali ("mythical beast") pillared Venkataramana temple built in the late 17th century at Bangalore fort, and the Ranganatha temple in Srirangapatna.

Tipu Sultan built a wooden colonnaded palace called the Dariya Daulat Palace (lit, "garden of the wealth of the sea") in Srirangapatna in 1784. Built in the Indo-Saracenic style, the palace is known for its intricate woodwork consisting of ornamental arches, striped columns floral designs, and paintings. The west wall of the palace is covered with murals depicting Tipu Sultan's victory over Colonel Baillie's army at Pollilur, near Kanchipuram in 1780. One mural shows Tipu enjoying the fragrance of a bouquet while the battle is in progress. In that painting, the French soldiers' moustaches distinguish them from the cleanshaven British soldiers. Also in Srirangapatna is the Gumbaz mausoleum, built by Tipu Sultan in 1784. It houses the graves of Tipu and Hyder Ali. The granite base is capped with a dome built of brick and pilasters.

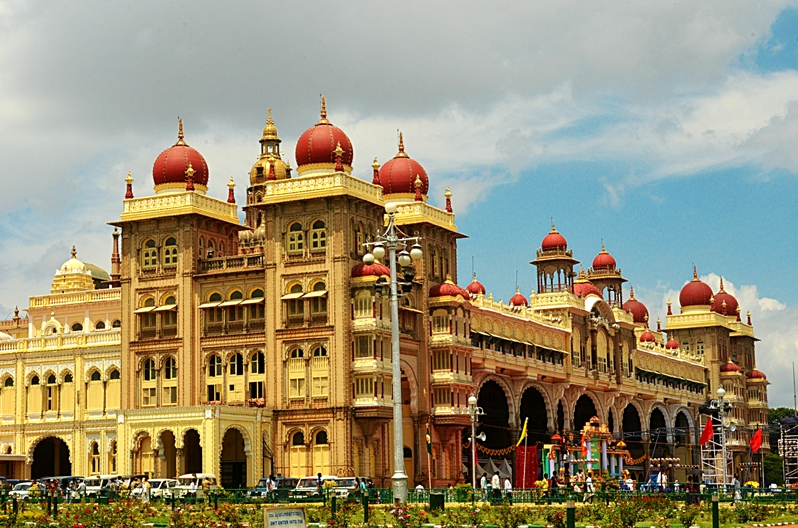
Mysore Palace

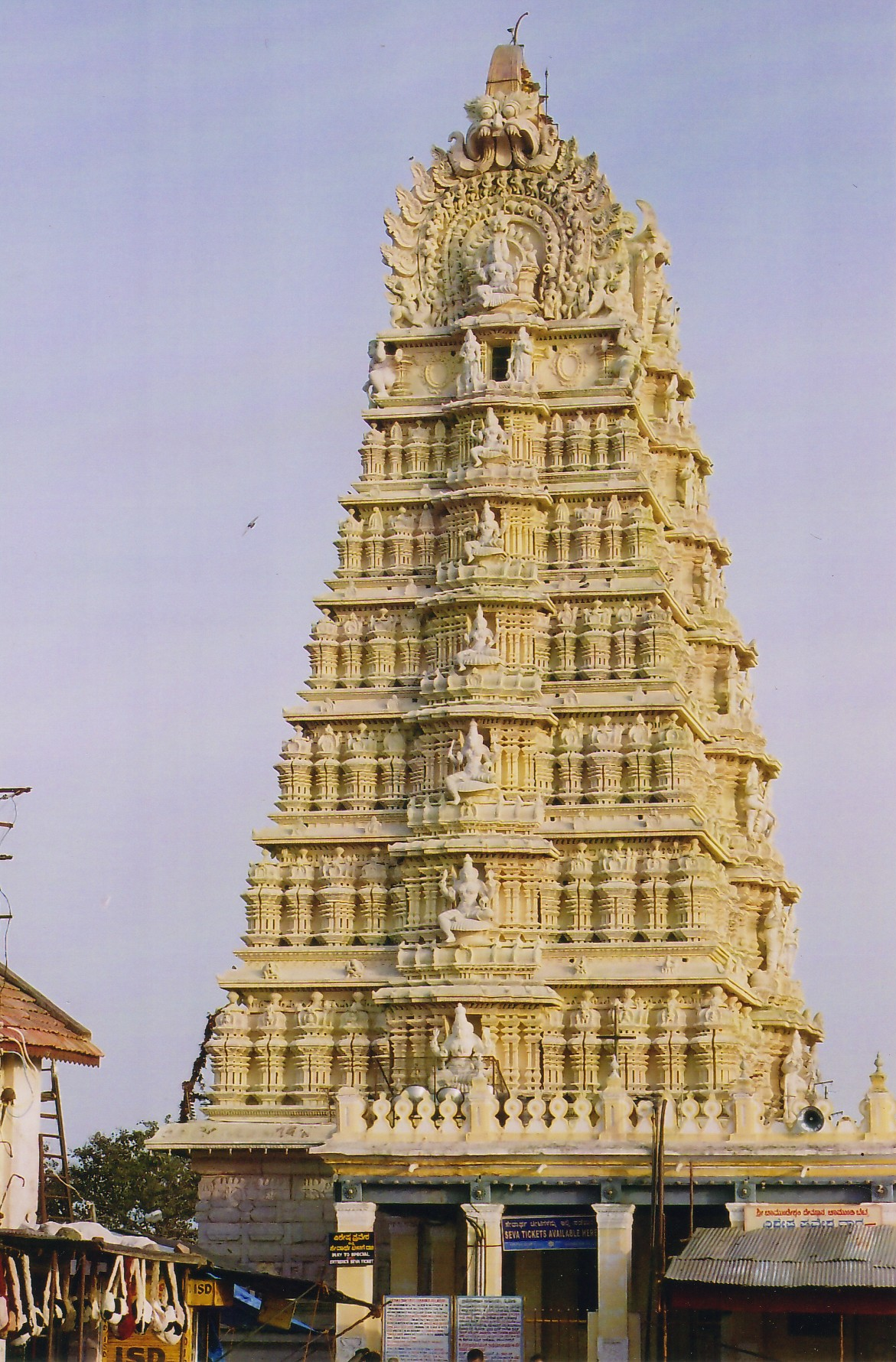
The Gopura (tower) of the Chamundeshwari Temple on the Chamundi Hills. The temple is dedicated to Mysore's patron deity.

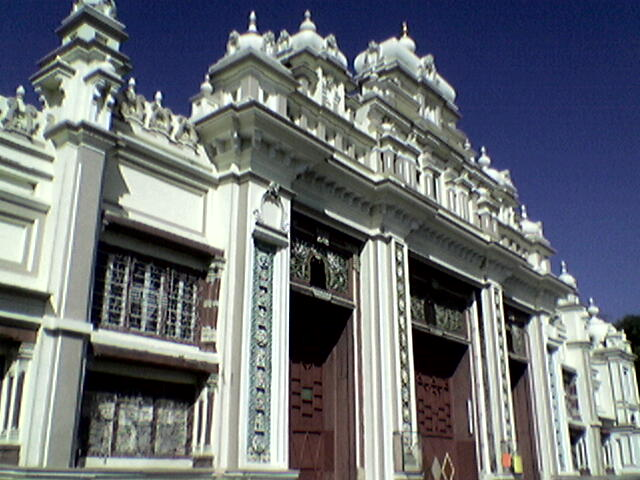
The Jaganmohan Palace at Mysore – now an art gallery which is home to some of Raja Ravi Varma's masterpieces

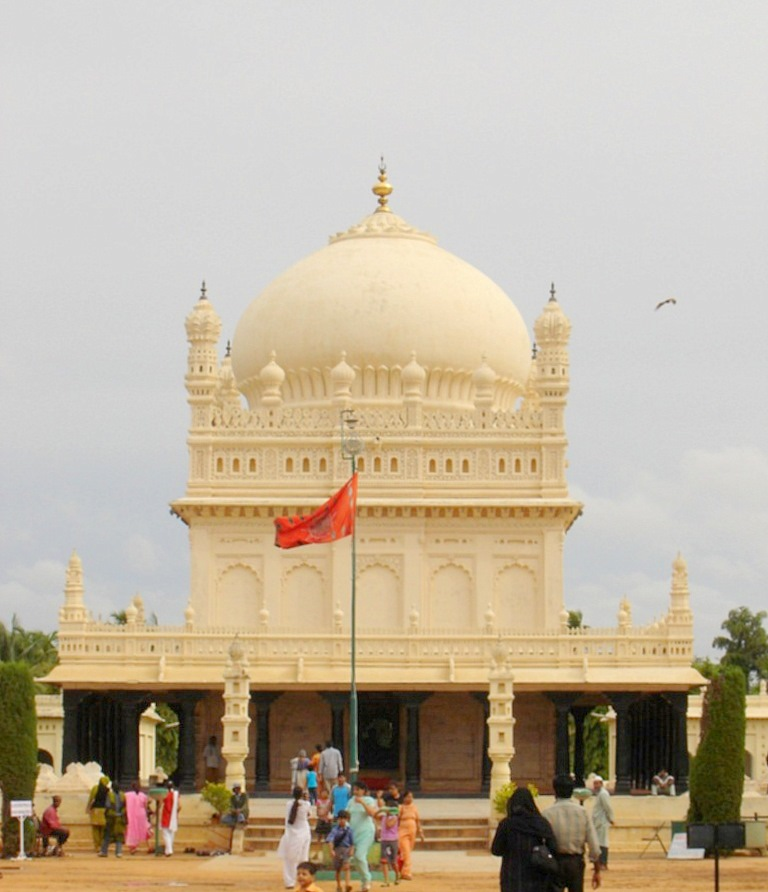
Tipu Sultan's tomb at Srirangapatna

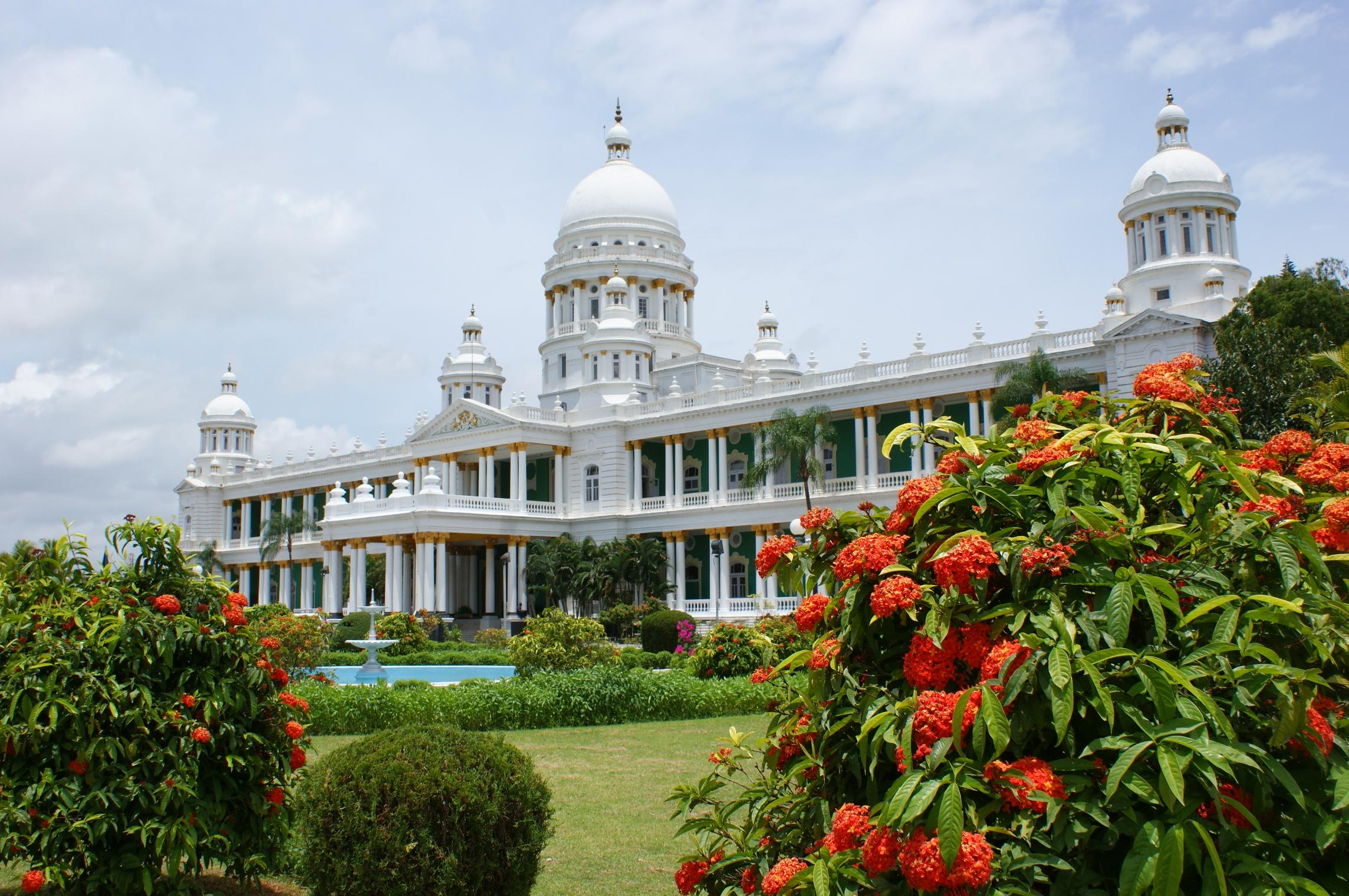
Lalitha Mahal at Mysore, now a five-star hotel, plays host to visiting dignitaries and VIPs.

== Science and technology in Mysore ==
=== Rocket science & rocket artillery ===
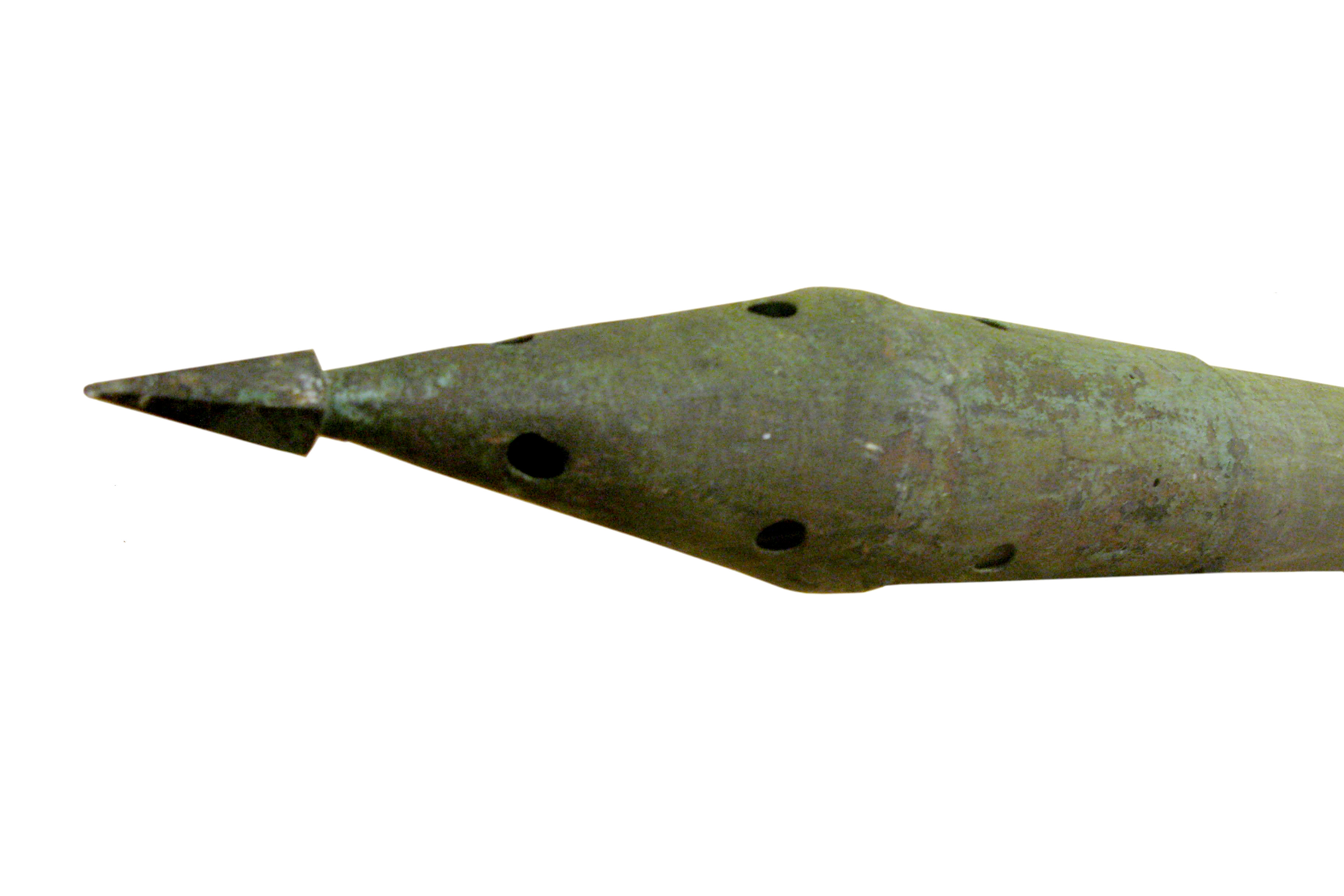
Tip of an early Mysorean rocket/Congreve rocket of the Napoleonic Wars, on display at Paris Naval Museum

The first iron-cased and metal-cylinder rocket artillery were invented by Tipu Sultan and his father Hyder Ali, in the 1780s. He successfully used these metal-cylinder rockets against the larger forces of the British East India Company during the Anglo-Mysore Wars. The Mysore rockets of this period were much more advanced than what the British had seen, chiefly because of the use of iron tubes for holding the propellant; this enabled higher thrust and longer range for the missile (up to 2 km (1 mi) range). After Tipu's eventual defeat in the Fourth Anglo-Mysore War and the capture of the Mysore iron rockets, they were influential in British rocket development, inspiring the Congreve rocket, which was soon put into use in the Napoleonic Wars.

According to Stephen Oliver Fought and John F. Guilmartin Jr. in Encyclopædia Britannica (2008):

Hyder Ali, prince of Mysore, developed war rockets with an important change: the use of metal cylinders to contain the combustion powder. Although the hammered soft iron he used was crude, the bursting strength of the container of black powder was much higher than the earlier paper construction. Thus a greater internal pressure was possible, with a resultant greater thrust of the propulsive jet. The rocket body was lashed with leather thongs to a long bamboo stick. The range was perhaps up to three-quarters of a mile (more than a kilometre). Although individually these rockets were not accurate, dispersion error became less important when large numbers were fired rapidly in mass attacks. They were particularly effective against cavalry and were hurled into the air, after lighting, or skimmed along the hard dry ground. Tipu Sultan, continued to develop and expand the use of rocket weapons, reportedly increasing the number of rocket troops from 1,200 to a corps of 5,000. In battles at Seringapatam in 1792 and 1799 these rockets were used with considerable effect against the British."

The rockets were observed by Lieutenant General Thomas Desaguliers, colonel commandant of the Royal Artillery at Woolwich, who was impressed by reports of their effectiveness, and undertook several unsuccessful experiments to produce his rocket weapons. Several captured Mysorean rockets were sent to England following the annexation of the Mysorean kingdom into British India following the death of Tipu Sultan in the siege of Seringapatam. The British research led to the development of the Congreve rocket, designed by British inventor Sir William Congreve in 1808.

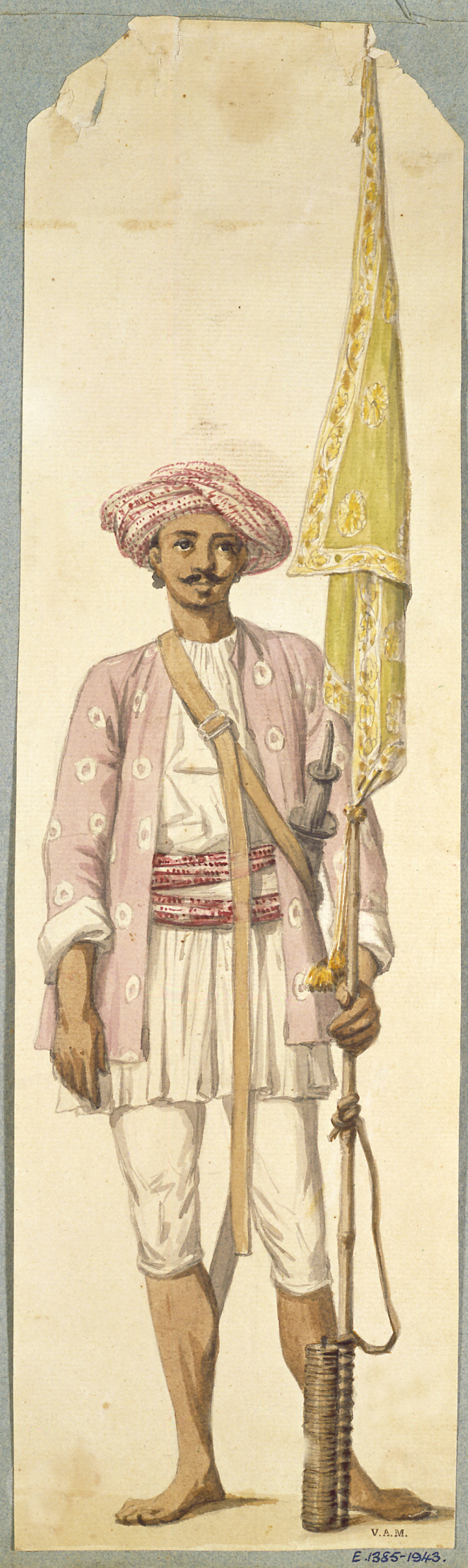
A soldier from Tipu Sultan's army, using his rocket as a flagstaff.

Dr APJ Abdul Kalam, the former President of India, in his Tipu Sultan Shaheed Memorial Lecture in Bangalore (30 November 1991), called Tipu Sultan the innovator of the world's first war rocket. Two of these rockets, captured by the British at Srirangapatna, were displayed in the Royal Artillery Museum in London. According to historian Dr Dulari Qureshi Tipu Sultan was a fierce warrior king and was so quick in his movement that it seemed to the enemy that he was fighting on many fronts at the same time.

Tipu Sultan's father had expanded on Mysore's use of rocketry, making critical innovations in the rockets themselves and the military logistics of their use. He deployed as many as 1,200 specialised troops in his army to operate rocket launchers. These men were skilled in operating the weapons and were trained to launch their rockets at an angle calculated from the diameter of the cylinder and the distance to the target. The rockets had twin side sharpened blades mounted on them, and when fired en masse, spun and wreaked significant damage against a large army. Tipu greatly expanded the use of rockets after Hyder's death, deploying as many as 5,000 rocketeers at a time. The rockets deployed by Tipu during the Battle of Pollilur were much more advanced than those the British East India Company had previously seen, chiefly because of the use of iron tubes for holding the propellant; this enabled higher thrust and longer range for the missiles (up to 2 km range).

British accounts describe the use of the rockets during the third and fourth wars. During the climactic battle at Srirangapatna in 1799, British shells struck a magazine containing rockets, causing it to explode and send a towering cloud of black smoke with cascades of exploding white light rising from the battlements. After Tipu's defeat in the Fourth War, the British captured a number of the Mysorean rockets. These became influential in British rocket development, inspiring the Congreve rocket, which was soon put into use in the Napoleonic Wars.

=== Tipu's Tiger ===
Tipu's Tiger is an 18th-century automaton or mechanical toy created for Tipu Sultan, the ruler of the Kingdom of Mysore (present-day Bengaluru) in India. The carved and painted wood casing represents a tiger mauling a near-life-size European man. Mechanisms inside the tiger and the man's body make one hand of the man move, emit a wailing sound from his mouth and grunt from the tiger. In addition, a flap on the side of the tiger folds down to reveal the keyboard of a small pipe organ with 18 notes.

The automaton makes use of his emblem of the tiger and expresses his hatred of his enemy, the British of the East India Company. The tiger was taken from his summer palace when East India Company troops stormed Tipu's capital in 1799. The Governor General, Lord Mornington, sent the tiger to Britain initially intending it to be an exhibit in the Tower of London. First exhibited to the London public in 1808 in East India House, then the offices of the East India Company in London, it was later transferred to the Victoria and Albert Museum (V&A) in 1880 (accession number 2545(IS)). It now forms part of the permanent exhibit on the "Imperial courts of South India". From the moment it arrived in London to the present day, Tipu's Tiger has been a popular attraction to the public.

=== Gallery ===
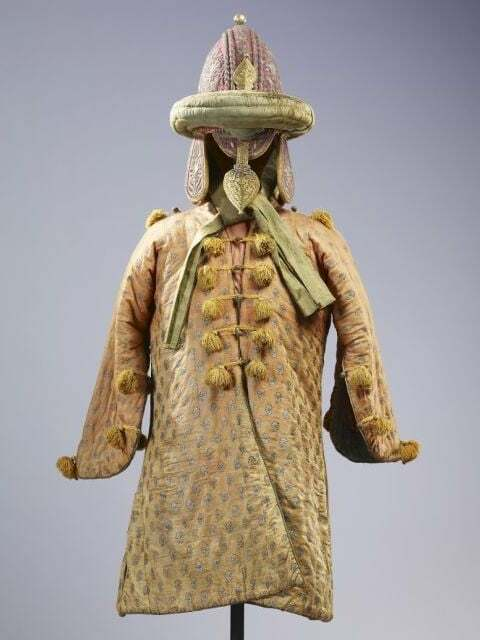
War coat used by Tipu Sultan of Mysore.c. 1785-1790

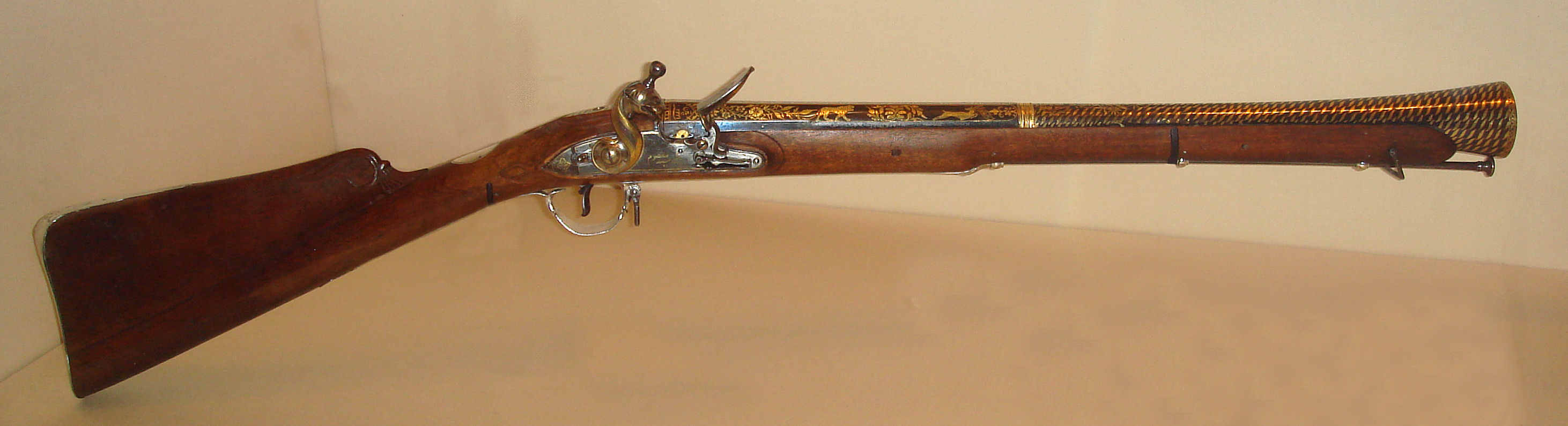
A flintlock blunderbuss, built for Tipu Sultan in Srirangapatna, 1793–94. Tipu Sultan used many Western craftsmen, and this gun reflects the most up-to-date technologies of the time.

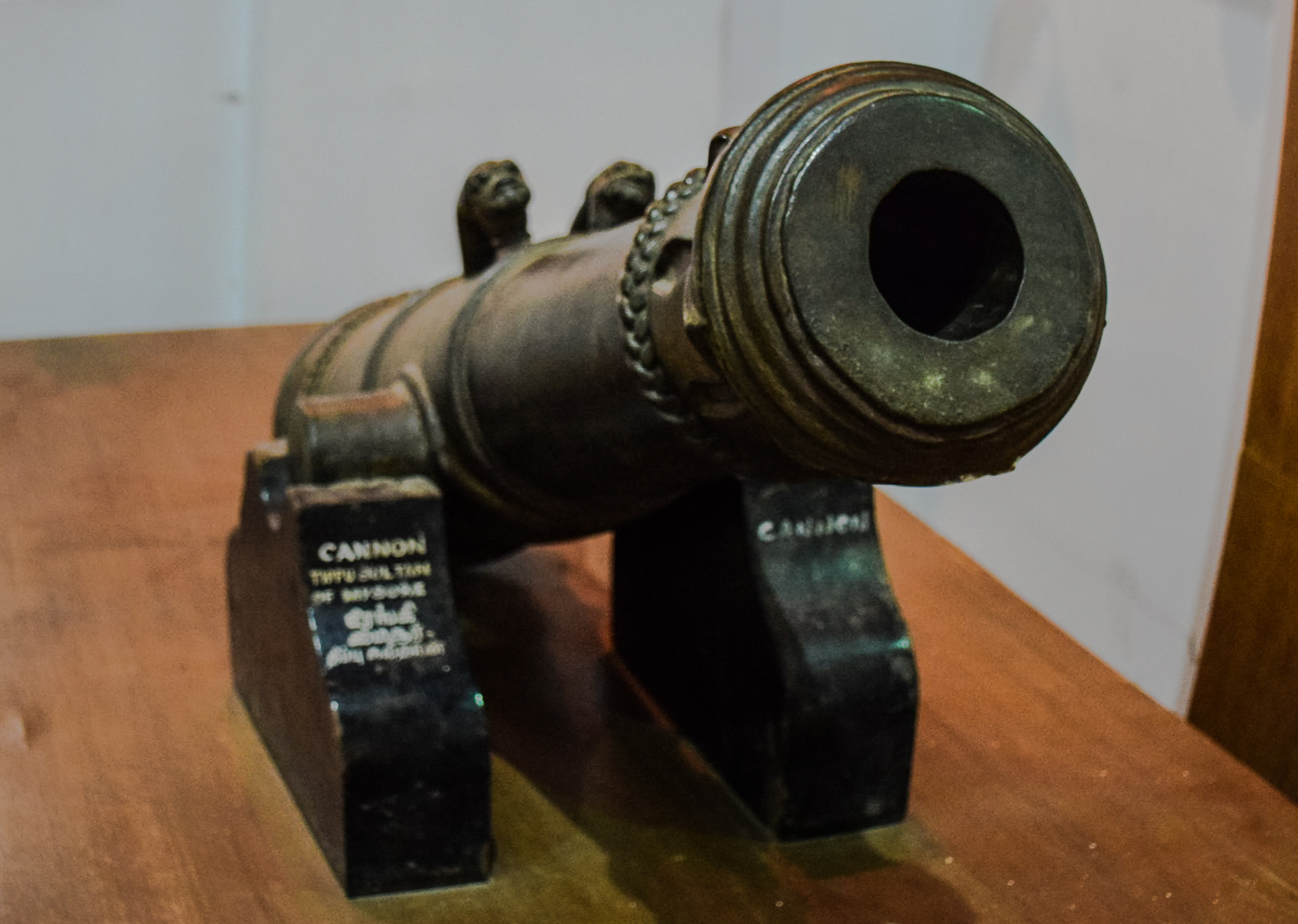
Very small Cannon used by Tipu Sultan's forces now in Government Museum (Egmore), Chennai

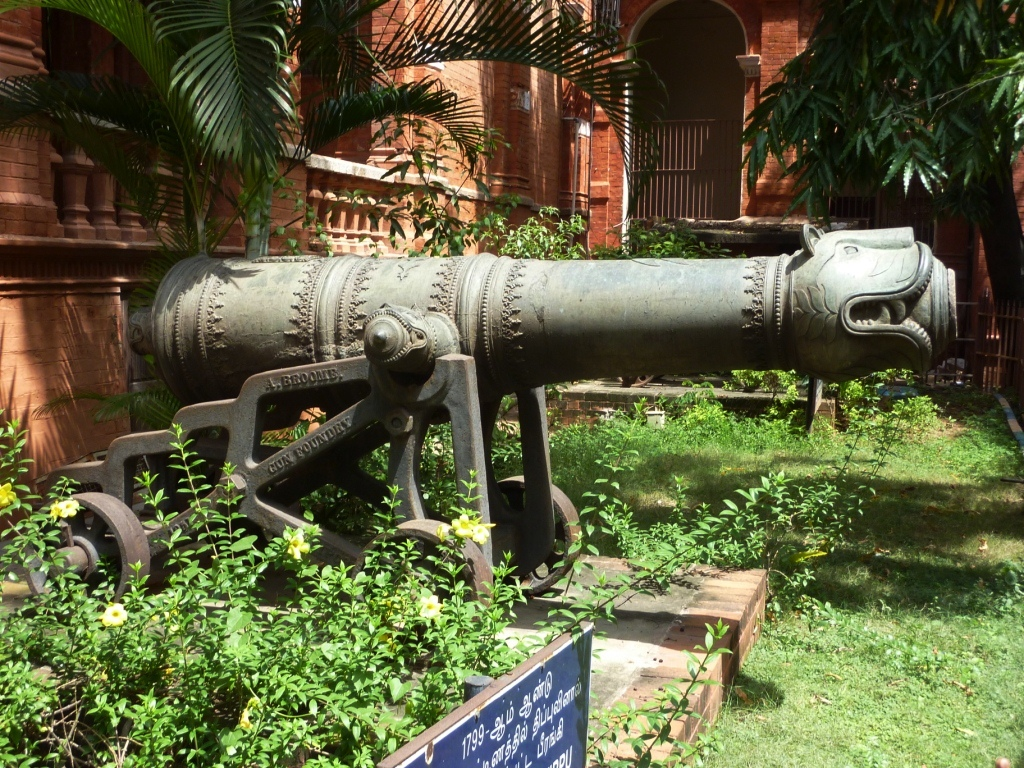
Cannon used by Tipu Sultan's forces at the battle of Srirangapatna 1799

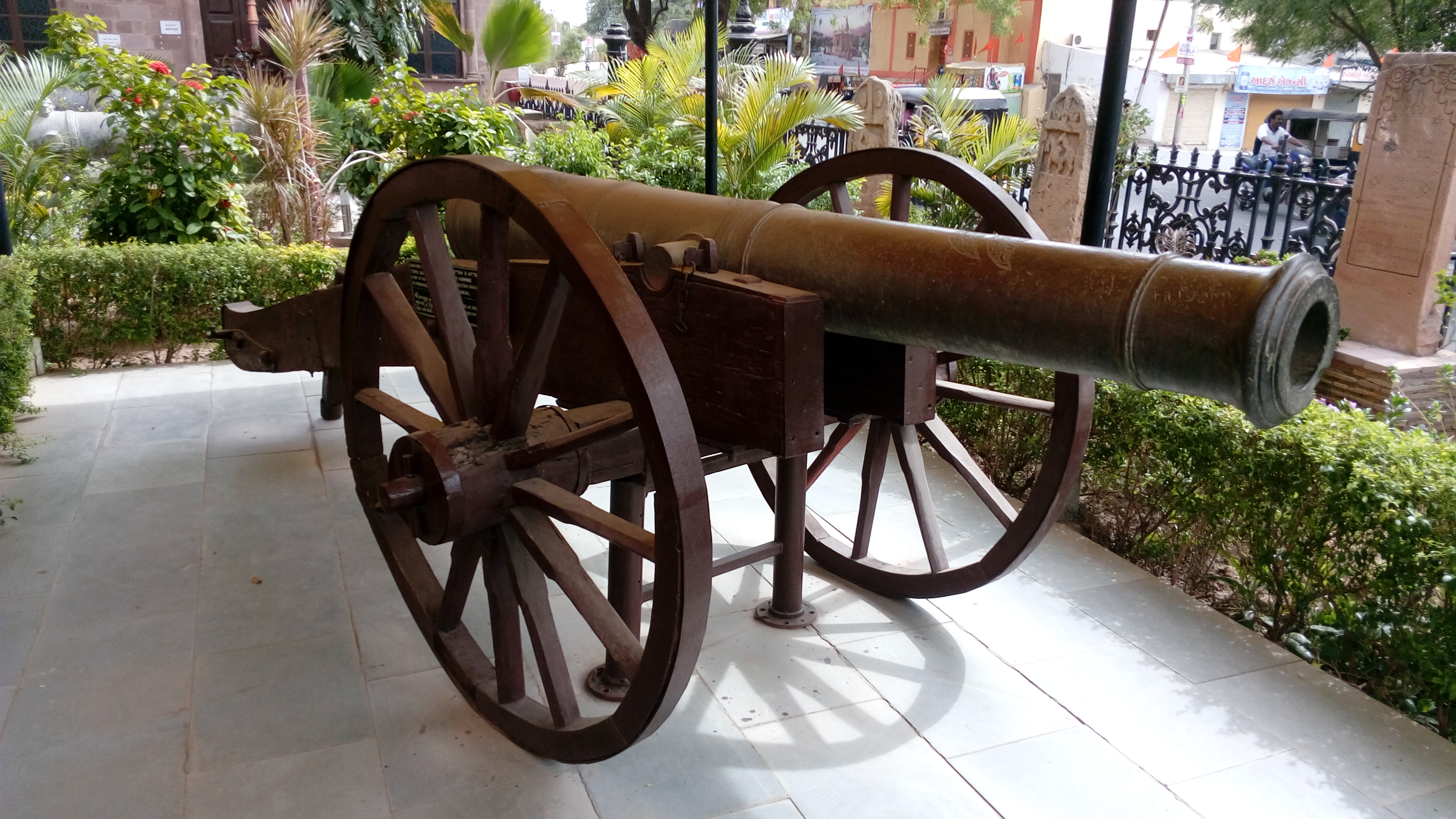
Cannon Haidari, a cannon gifted by Tipu Sultan to Fateh Muhammad.

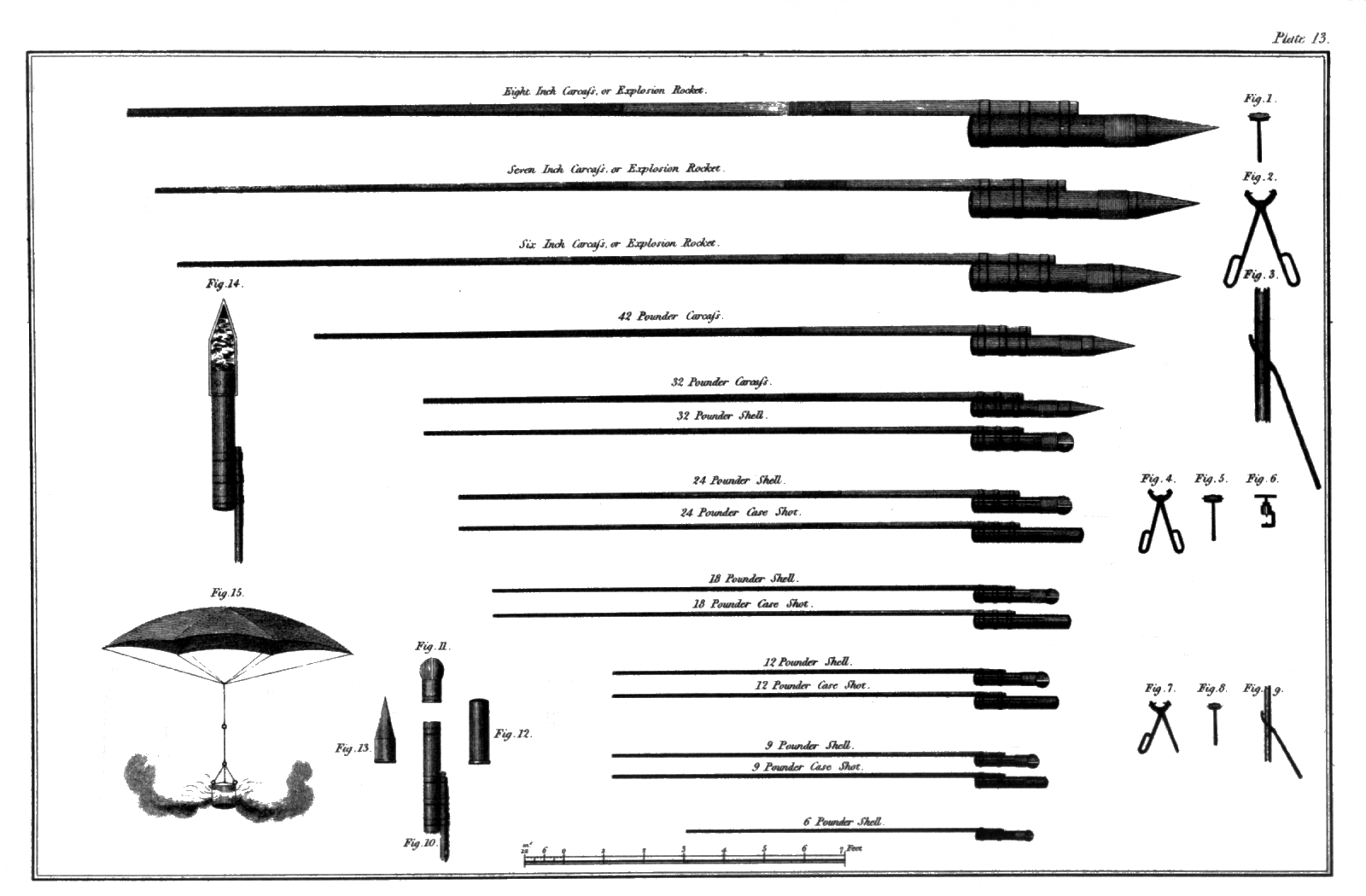
Tipu Sultan organised his Rocket artillery brigades known as Cushoons, Tipu Sultan expanded the number of servicemen in the various Cushoons from 1500 to almost 5000. The Mysorean rockets utilised by Tipu Sultan, were later updated by the British and successively employed during the Napoleonic Wars.

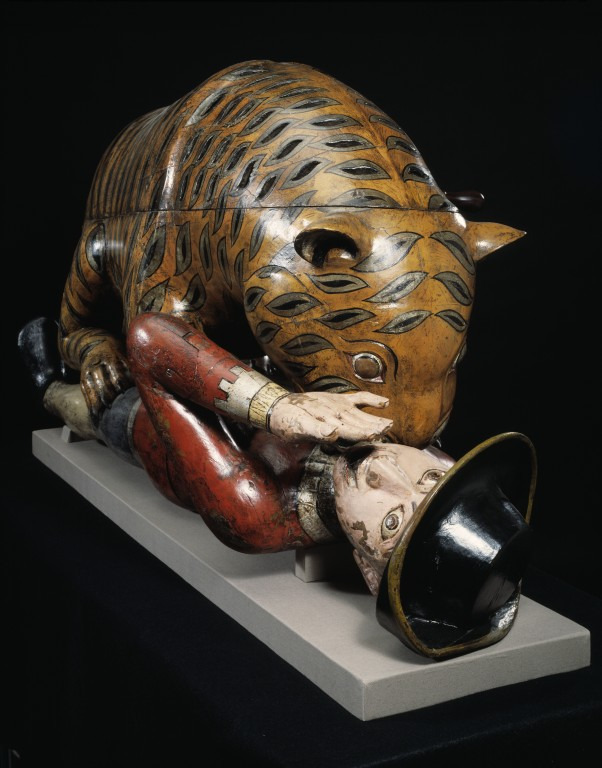
Tipu's Tiger in the V&A Museum, London showing the prostrate European being attacked

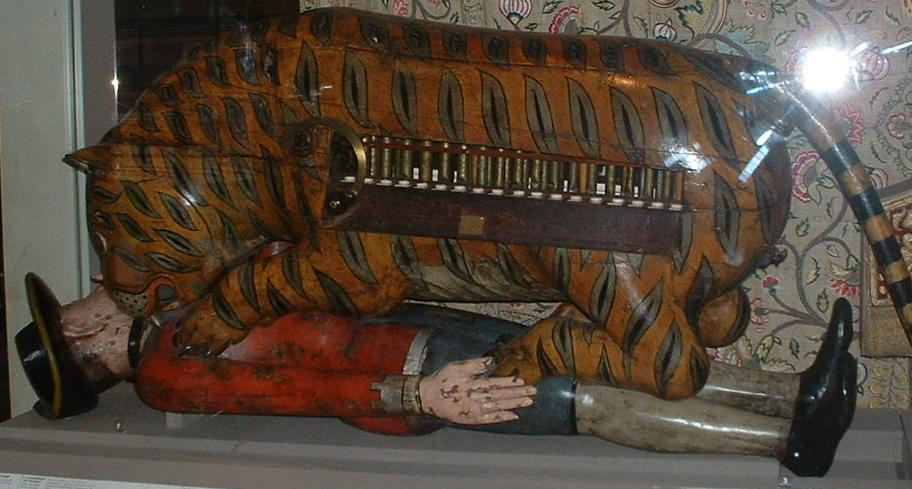
Side view, showing how the handle when turned gets in the way of the player of the keyboard

== See also ==
- List of Indian princely states
- Hyderabad State
- Mysorean invasion of Malabar
- Political integration of India
- Mughal Empire

== Bibliography ==
- Abram, David; Edwards, Nick; Ford, Mike; Sen, Devdan; Wooldridge, Beth (2003). South India. Rough Guides. ISBN 1-84353-103-8.
- Aiyangar, Krishnaswami S. (1911). Ancient India: Collected Essays on the Literary and Political History of Southern India. New Delhi: (Facsimile Reprint 2004) Asian Educational Services. ISBN 81-206-1850-5.
- Bakshi, Shiri Ram (1996). Gandhi and the Congress. New Delhi: Sarup and Sons. ISBN 81-85431-65-5.
- Bradnock, Robert (2000) [2000]. South India Handbook – The Travel Guide. Footprint Travel Guide. ISBN 1-900949-81-4.
- Chopra, P. N.; Ravindran, T. K.; Subrahmanian, N. (2003). History of South India (Ancient, Medieval and Modern) Part III. New Delhi: Sultan Chand and Sons. ISBN 81-219-0153-7.
- Indian Science Congress Association (various authors), Presidential Address, vol 1: 1914–1947 (2003). The Shaping of Indian Science. Orient Blackswan. ISBN 81-7371-432-0.
- Kamath, Suryanath U. (2001) [1980]. A concise history of Karnataka : from pre-historic times to the present. Bangalore: Jupiter books. LCCN 80905179. OCLC 7796041.
- Manchanda, Bindu (2006) [2006]. Forts & Palaces of India: Sentinels of History. Roli Books Private Limited. ISBN 81-7436-381-5.
- Michell, George (17 August 1995). "Temple Architecture: The Kannada and Telugu zones". The New Cambridge History of India: Architecture and Art of Southern India. Cambridge University Press. ISBN 0-521-44110-2.
- Mukherjee, Sujit (1999) [1999]. A Dictionary of Indian Literature. Orient Blackswan. ISBN 81-250-1453-5.
- Murthy, K. Narasimha (1992). "Modern Kannada Literature". In George K.M (ed.). Modern Indian Literature:An Anthology – Vol 1. Sahitya Akademi. ISBN 81-7201-324-8.
- Nagaraj, D.R. (2003) [2003]. "Critical Tensions in the History of Kannada Literary Culture". In Sheldon I. Pollock (ed.). Literary Cultures in History: Reconstructions from South Asia. Berkeley and London: University of California Press. ISBN 0-520-22821-9.
- Narasimhacharya, R (1988) [1934]. History of Kannada Literature. New Delhi: Asian Educational Services. ISBN 81-206-0303-6.
- Pranesh, Meera Rajaram (2003) [2003]. Musical Composers during Wodeyar Dynasty (1638–1947 A.D.). Bangalore: Vee Emm. ISBN 978-8193101605.
- Raman, Afried (1994). Bangalore – Mysore: A Disha Guide. Bangalore: Orient Blackswan. ISBN 0-86311-431-8.
- Rice, E. P. (1921). Kannada Literature. New Delhi: (Facsimile Reprint 1982) Asian Educational Services. ISBN 81-206-0063-0.
- Rice, B.L. (2001) [1897]. Mysore Gazetteer Compiled for Government-vol 1. New Delhi, Madras: Asian Educational Services. ISBN 81-206-0977-8.
- Sastri, Nilakanta K.A. (2005) [1955]. A history of South India from prehistoric times to the fall of Vijayanagar. New Delhi: Indian Branch, Oxford University Press. ISBN 0-19-560686-8.
- Singh, Nagendra Kr (2001). Encyclopaedia of Jainism. Anmol Publications. ISBN 81-261-0691-3.
- Stein, Burton (1987). Vijayanagara (The New Cambridge History of India). Cambridge and New York: Cambridge University Press. Pp. 156. ISBN 0-521-26693-9.
- Subrahmanyam, Sanjay (2001). "Warfare and State Finance in Wodeyar Mysore". In Subrahmanyam, Sanjay (ed.). Penumbral Visions. Ann Arbor: University of Michigan Press. pp. 161–193. ISBN 978-0-472-11216-6.
- Subramaniyan, V.K. (2006) [2006]. 101 Mystics of India. Abhinav Publications. ISBN 81-7017-471-6.
- Various (1988) [1988]. Encyclopaedia of Indian literature – vol 2. Sahitya Akademi. ISBN 81-260-1194-7.
- Venkata Ramanappa, M. N. (1975) [1975]. Outlines of South Indian history : with special reference to Karnataka. Delhi : Vikas Pub. House; London (38 Kennington La., SE11 4LS) : [Distributed by] Independent Pub. Co. ISBN 0-7069-0378-1.
- Weidman, Amanda J (2006) [2006]. Singing the Classical, Voicing the Modern. Duke University Press. ISBN 0-8223-3620-0.
