= Gutti =

- Village
- Location in Karnataka, India
- Coordinates: 17.96408°N 76.93906°E
- Country: India
- State: Karnataka
- District: Bidar
- Talukas: Belgaum

Languages
  - Official: Kannada
- Time zone: UTC+5:30 (IST)

Gutti is a village in Bidar district in the southern state of Karnataka, India.
