= Suryanath U. Kamath =

Suryanath Upendra Kamath
- Born: 26 April 1937; British India
- Died: 21 October 2015 (aged 78)
- Occupation: historian
- Known for: Books on History of Karnataka, Chief Editor of Karnataka State Gazetteer

Suryanath Upendra Kamath (26 April 1937 – 21 October 2015) was an Indian historian who served as the Chief Editor of the Karnataka State Gazetteer from 1981 to 1995.

== Early life ==
Kamath was born in a Konkani-speaking family on 26 April 1937. After studying history and economics at Dharwad University, Kamath joined the Bangalore University as a lecturer and reader in history in 1968.

During his graduation in Dharwad University, Kamath came under the influence of historian B. A. Saletore who had written a comprehensive two-volume book on social and political life in the Vijayanagar Empire.

== Career ==
Kamath served as lecturer and reader in history at the Bangalore University from 1968 to 1981. In 1981, he was appointed director of the Karnataka State Archives. He served as director of the Karnataka State Archives from 1981 to 1983 and was the Chief Editor of the Karnataka State Gazetteer from 1981 to 1995. He also edited the Karnataka District Gazetteers and since 1977, has been the editor of the Quarterly Journal of the Mythic Society. He founded the Karnataka Ithihasa Academy along with G. S. Dikshith in 1985. He was also the director of the Raja Ram Mohan Roy Public Library in Calcutta. Kamath edited the quarterly journal of the Indian Mythic Society from 1977 to his death. He was also a member of the Karnataka Gazetteer Advisory Committee.

== Methodology ==
Kamath's methodology was Indian nationalist. He has authored many books on the Indian independence movement. He denied the existence of an Aryan race and considered the Indus Valley civilization to be simply an urban version of Vedic civilization.

== Works ==
- Sreenivasa Murthy, H. V.; Kamath, Suryanath Upendra (1973). Studies in Indian culture. Asia Publishing House.
- Kamath, Suryanath U. (1977). Karnataka: A handbook. Kannada Sahitya Parishad.
- Kamath, Suryanath U. (1980). A concise history of Karnataka: (from pre-historic times to the present). Archana Prakashana.
- Kamath, U. Suryanath, ed. (1981–1995). Karnataka State Gazetteer. Government of Karnataka.
- Kamath, Suryanath U. (1991). Historiography of Karnataka. Mythic Society.
- Kamath, Suryanath U. (1992). The origin and spread of Gauda Saraswats. Archana Prakashana.
- Kamath, Suryanath U. (1993). Mythology and culture: confluence of thoughts. Mythic Society.
- Kamath, Suryanath U. (2002). "Indian Tradition of Textile Industry". The quarterly journal of the Mythic society. 97. Bangalore: Mythic Society.
- Kamath, Suryanath U. (2007). India's struggle for freedom. Bhavan's Gandhi Centre of Science and Human Values. ISBN 8189220187, ISBN 978-81-89220-18-1.
- Kamath, Suryanath U. (2009). Krishnadevaraya of Vijayanagara and his times. IBH Prakashana.
- Kamath, Suryanath U. Hindirugi Nodidaga (in Kannada).
