= List of religious buildings and structures of the Kingdom of Mysore =

The List of religious buildings and structures of the Kingdom of Mysore includes notable and historically important Hindu temples, royal palaces, churches, mosques, military fortification and other courtly structures that were built or received significant embellishment by the rulers of the Kingdom of Mysore. The term "Kingdom of Mysore" broadly covers the various stages the Mysore establishment went through: A Vijayanagara vassal (c. 1399 – 1565), an independent Hindu Kingdom ruled by the Wodeyar dynasty (c. 1565 – 1761), ruled by the de facto rulers Hyder Ali and Tipu Sultan who took control of the Kingdom (c. 1761 – 1799), and a princely monarchy under the British Raj (c. 1799 – 1950) before the establishment became a part of an independent India.

Name of the structure	Photo	Timeline	Location	Notes
Kodi Bhairavaswamy (or Kodi Someshwara Swamy)		c. 1399	Mysore palace grounds	Built by the brothers Yaduraya and Krishnaraya (r. 1399–1423), the founders of the dynasty
Lakshmiramana Swamy		c. 1499	Mysore palace grounds	From the Banni mantapa inscription it is known the temple was consecrated in 1499 during the rule of Chamaraja Wodeyar II (r. 1478–1513) with later additions by Kings Narasaraja Wodeyar I (r. 1638–1659) and Krishnaraja Wodeyar III in 1851
Gunja Narasimhaswamy		16th century	Tirumakudal Narasipur	The pre-existing temple was under the patronage of the local governor of Mysore, during the Vijayanagara rule over South India.
Trinayaneshvara Swamy		Earlier than c. 1578	Mysore palace grounds	Existed before Raja Wodeyar I of (r. 1578–1617) and was later expanded by Kanthirava Narasaraja I (r. 1638–59).
Lakshmikanta		c. 1625	Heggaddevanakote	The original 13th-century Hoysala era construction was expanded by King Chamaraja Wodeyar VI (r. 1617–37). Additions included a pillared mahamandapa ("large hall") and a mukhamandapa ("entrance hall"). An inscription on the dhvajastambha ("flag pillar") in the temple claims King Chamaraja Wodeyar VI had it erected in c. 1625.
Narasimha Swamy		First half of 17th century	Srirangapatna	The temple was built by Kanthirava Narasaraja Wodeyar (r. 1638–1659). His statue (dated 17th century) and that of the main deity Narasimha were re-installed in c. 1826 by King Krishnaraja Wodeyar III. An inscription on the pedestal in the Kannada script confirms it is the statue of "Kanthirava Narasaraja Wodeyaravaru".
Nandi monolith		c. 1659 – 1673	Chamundi Hills, Mysore	commissioned by King Dodda Devaraja (also called Dodda Kempadevaraja, r. 1659–1673).
Shveta Varaswamy		Late 17th century-early 19th century	Mysore palace grounds	Built by King Chikkadevaraja Wodeyar (r. 1673–1704) and later expanded by Dewan Puraniah, chief minister of King Krishnaraja Wodeyar III (r. 1799–1868).
Temple tank (Kalyani)		c. 1673 – 1704	Shravanabelagola	King Chikkadevaraja Wodeyar constructed the pond and made a large endowments to the Jain monastic order at Shravanabelagola.
Yoga Narasimha		c.1696	Devarayana Durga hill	Built by King Chikkadevaraja Wodeyar
Bhoga Narasimha		c.1696	Devarayana Durga hill	Built by King Chikkadevaraja Wodeyar
Paravasudeva		c. 1673 – 1704	Gundlupet	The temple was built in Dravidian style during the rule of King Chikkadevaraja Wodeyar in memory of his father Doddadevaraja Wodeyar.
Gopala Krishna		c. 1673 – 1704	Haradanahalli	Built by Chikkadevaraja Wodeyar in response to the taunts of the Maratha prince of Tanjore.
Varadaraja		c. 1673 – 1704	Varkod	Built by Chikkadevaraja Wodeyar in response to the taunts of the Maratha prince of Tanjore.
Mahalakshmi		c. 1673 – 1704	Mysore palace grounds	Built by King Chikkadevaraja Wodeyar about the same time as the Shveta Varahaswamy temple.
Kote Venkataramana		c. 1689	Bangalore	The temple was built in 1689 AD in Dravidian and Vijayanagara style by King Chikkadevaraja Wodeyar.
Lakshmikanta		Before c. 1732	Kalale	The pre-existing temple was expanded and lavish grants were made by King Dodda Krishnaraja I (r. 1714–1732) before c. 1732.
Kille Venkatramana Swamy		c. 1734 – 1766	Mysore palace grounds	Built by King Krishnaraja Wodeyar II.
Shivappa Nayaka Palace		c. 1760 – c. 1782	Shivamogga	Though named after the Shivappa Nayaka, according to art historian George Michell, the palatial bungalow was actually built by the Mysore ruler Hyder Ali.
Lal Bagh Botanical Garden		c. 1760	Bangalore	First planned and laid out during the rule of Hyder Ali and later adorned with unique plant species by Tipu Sultan is a popular botanical garden.
Bangalore Fort		c. 1761	Bangalore	First built in mud in c. 1537 by Kempe Gowda I, the founder of Bangalore, and later re-built in stone by Hyder Ali in 1761 and further improved by Tipu Sultan in the late 18th century. It was damaged during an Anglo-Mysore war in 1791. It still remains a good example of 18th-century military fortification.
Madhugiri Fort		late 18th century	Madhugiri, Tumkur district	The original fort is ascribed to Here Gauda, a Vijayanagara vassal of the fifteenth century. In c. 1678 the fort was captured by Chikka Devaraja Wodeyar, the King of Mysore. Haider Ali extended and further strengthened it.
Devanahalli Fort		c. 1760 – 1782	Devanahalli	Chieftain Malla Byre Gowda of Avathi, a Vijayanagara Empire vassal, built a mud fort in c. 1501 at Devanadoddi (now called Devanahalli). In the late 18th century, Hyder Ali re-constructed the fort in stone resulting in the current structure.
Colonel Bailey's Dungeon		before c. 1780	Srirangapatna	Where Colonel Bailey was imprisoned by Hyder Ali and died in 1780.
Narasimha Swamy		Late 18th century (before c. 1799)	Seebi	Built during the rule of Tipu Sultan by three wealthy brothers: Lakshminarasappa, Puttanna and Nallappa, who were the sons of Kacheri Krishnappa, a Dewan in the court of King Tipu Sultan.
Daria Daulat Bagh		c. 1784	Srirangapatna	Tipu Sultan built this wooden this colonnaded palace (lit, "garden of the wealth of the sea"). Built in the Indo-Saracenic style, the palace is known for its intricate woodwork, striped columns, floral designs, and paintings.
Gumbaz, Seringapatam		c. 1784	Srirangapatna	Built by Tipu Sultan himself, holds the graves of Tipu Sultan and his father Hyder Ali.
Tipu Sultan's Summer Palace		c. 1791	Bangalore	The construction of the palace was commissioned by Hyder Ali in c. 1781 and completed by Tipu Sultan in c. 1791.
Jama Masjid		c. 1794	Srirangapatna	The Jama Masjid mosque named Masjid-e-Ala with two beautiful minarets was built by Tipu Sultan in 1794.
Tipu Sultan's Palace		Late 18th century	Nandi Hills	Interior of Tipu Sultan's summer Palace.
Nandi Hills Fort		Late 18th century	Nandi Hills	Fort built by Tipu Sultan on Nandi Hills.
Manjarabad Fort		c. 1792	Manjrabad, Hassan district	Built by Tipu Sultan who renamed 'Balam' as Manjarabad to reflect the foggy atmosphere in the fort ("fog" in native Kannada is manju) in the region.
Srirangapatna Fort		Late 18th century	Srirangapatna	Currently nominated for recognition as UNESCO World Heritage Site. Epigraphically the fort dates back to c. 1220 rule of Hoysala Empire King Vishnuvardhana. Later the fort underwent modifications under the Vijayanagara empire and Kanthirava Narasaraja Wodeyar of the Mysore Kingdom in c. 1654. In c. 1791, the fort obtained its current design and structure under the rule of Tipu Sultan. A military authority who visited Srirangapatna in c. 1888 opined that it was the second strongest fort in India.
War Memorial		After c. 1799	Srirangapatna	Memorial for the British soldiers who died in the fourth Anglo Mysore war.
Sultan Battery		Late 18th century	Mangalore	A coastal fort built by Tipu Sultan just outside Mangalore city. Currently only parts of the fortification remain.
Tipu's Memorial		After c. 1799	Srirangapatna	Spot where Tipu Sultan's died after Mysore's defeat to the British in fourth Anglo-Mysore war.
Srikanteshwara		c. 1799 – 1868	Nanjanagud	King Krishnaraja Wodeyar constructed the main gopura (tower over the entrance) and made other improvements in c. 1845. According to historian George Michell the original consecration of the temple dates from the 17th century Wodeyar dynasty of the Mysore Kingdom. Karachuri Nanja Raja (Dalavoy of Mysore in the mid-18th century) and Dewan Purnaiah (the first Dewan of Mysore, early 19th century) expanded the temple significantly.
Wellington Lodge		c. 1810	Mysore	Residence of Arthur Wellesley (later called Lord Wellington) after the death of Tipu Sultan.
St. Mark's Cathedral, Bangalore		c. 1812	Bangalore	Its architecture is inspired by the 17th-century St Paul's Cathedral in London.
Arakeshwara		c. 1799 – 1868	Hale Yedatore	King Krishnaraja Wodeyar endowed this temple.
Chamundeshwari		c. 1827	Chamundi Hills, Mysore	This temple has a history dating back to the 12th century. Later King Krishnaraja Wodeyar III built the temple tower (gopura) and presented the Nakshatramalika jewel with Sanskrit verses inscribed on it.
Prasanna Krishanswami		c. 1829	Mysore palace grounds	Built by King Krishnaraja Wodeyar III.
Kote Anjaneya		c. 1829	Mysore palace grounds	Built by King Krishnaraja Wodeyar III
Kodanda Rama		19th century	Chunchankatte (Krishnaraja Nagara)	Built by King Krishnaraja Wodeyar III
Chamarajeshwara		c. 1825	Chamarajanagara	Built by King Krishnaraja Wodeyar III.
Fernhills Palace		c. 1844	Ooty	The summer Palace of the Mysore Maharajas, was actually built in 1844 by Capt. F. Cotton. In 1873, Maharaja Chamarajendra Wodeyar X bought the palace.
Bangalore Palace		c. 1864	Bangalore	The Bangalore Palace, built on the model of Windsor Castle was built by Rev. Garrett, first Principal of Central College. In 1884, it was bought by the then Maharaja, Chamarajendra Wodeyar X. Modifications continued until final completion in 1927.
Cubbon Park		c. 1870	Bangalore	Originally the park was laid out in c. 1870 and was called Cubbon Park after Sir Mark Cubbon, the British Commissioner. It houses Victorian style buildings such as the Karnataka High Court and the City Central library (Sheshadri Iyer Memorial hall). In the year 1927, the park was officially renamed as "Sri Chamarajendra Park" to commemorate the Silver Jubilee of Maharaja Krishnaraja Wodeyar's rule in Mysore State.
Lokaranjan Mahal		c. 1880	Mysore	Completed when Mysore was directly under the resident British Commissioners and served as a summer home for the royal family.
Jayalakshmi Vilas		c. 1887 – 1891	Mysore	The Jayalakshmi Vilas mansion was constructed during the rule of Maharaja Chamarajendra Wadiyar X.
Mysore University		c. 1887 – 1891	Mysore	The Crawford hall on the campus was constructed during the rule of Maharaja Chamarajendra Wadiyar X
Karnataka High Court		c. 1881	Bangalore	The High Court is known as Attara Kacheri (lit, "Eighteen offices") was originally built in 1868 and later expanded.
Mayo Hall		Late 19th century	Bangalore	Built in memory of the 4th Viceroy of India, Lord Mayo.
Mysore Palace		c. 1897	Mysore	Also known as the Amba Vilas Palace, the original complex was destroyed by fire and a new palace built in Indo-Saracenic style was commissioned by the Queen-Regent (Maharaja Krishnaraja Wodeyar IV) and designed by the English architect Henry Irwin in 1897.
Cheluvamba Mansion		c. 1900	Mysore	This Mansion was built for the third daughter of Krishnaraja Wodeyar IV, princess Cheluvajammanni and is therefore called Cheluvamba Mansion. It now serves as the Central Food Technological Research Institute, Government of India.
Jaganmohan Palace		c. 1910	Mysore	The Jaganmohan Palace was commissioned in c. 1861 Maharaja Krishnaraja Wodeyar III and was completed in 1910 during the rule of Krishnaraja Wodeyar IV. It is now called the Chamarajendra Art Gallery and houses a rich collection of artifacts
Karanji Mansion		c. 1902 – 1914	Mysore	Karanji Mansion in Nazarbad Mohalla was constructed for the second daughter of Krishnaraja Wodeyar IV, princess Krishnarajammanni. The Mansion is built using the Indo-Sarcenic Renaissance style of architecture in 1902. It now serves as the Postal Training Institute, Government of India.
Lalitha Mahal		c. 1921	Mysore	The Lalitha Mahal Palace was built in 1921 by E.W. Fritchley under the commission of Maharaja Krishnaraja Wodeyar IV. The architectural style is called "Renaissance" and exhibits concepts from English manor houses and Italian palazzos.
St. Philomena's Church		c. 1930	Mysore	Built during the rule of Maharaja Krishnaraja Wodeyar IV is in Gothic style with stained glass windows. It is one of the biggest churches in India.
Brindavan Gardens		c. 1932	Srirangapatna	The work on laying out the garden (also called Krishna Raja Sagara) was started in the c. 1927 and completed in c. 1932 when Sir Mirza Ismail was the Dewan of Mysore and Maharaja Krishnaraja Wodeyar IV sat on the Mysore throne.
Rajendra Vilas Palace		c. 1938	Mysore (Chamundi hills)	The Rajendra Vilas palace, built in the Indo-British style, was commissioned in 1922 and completed in 1938 by Maharaja Krishnaraja IV.
Bhuvaneshwari		c. 1951	Mysore palace grounds	Built in 1951 by King Jayachamarajendra Wodeyar (r. 1940–1950; Titular:1950–1974) and the famous sculptor Sri Siddalingaswamy carved the image of the goddess Bhuvaneshwari .
Gayathri		c. 1953	Mysore palace grounds	Built by King Jayachamarajendra Wodeyar in 1953.
Jamia Masjid Irwin Road		c. 1927	Irwin Road [ A road named in honour of Sir Henry Irwin, who also designed Mysore Palace]	Built By Dewan Mirza Ismail in 1927 in indo Islamic architecture
