= Hanumappa =

Hanumappa is a name. People with the name include:

- Hanumappa Shivraj
- Hanumappa Sudarshan
- Hande Hanumappa Nayaka
- Hanumappa Muniappa Reddy

== See also ==
- Advise of Hanumappa Nayaka
