= Ranadheera Kanteerava =

Ranadheera Kantheerava
- Directed by: N. C. Rajan
- Written by: G. V. Iyer
- Screenplay by: G. V. Iyer
- Story by: G. V. Iyer
- Produced by: Rajkumar; G. V. Iyer; Narasimharaju; Balakrishna
- Starring: Rajkumar; Leelavathi; K. S. Ashwath; Udaykumar; Balakrishna
- Cinematography: B. Dorairaj
- Edited by: N. C. Rajan
- Music by: G. K. Venkatesh
- Production company: Kannada Chalanachitra Kalavidara Sangha
- Distributed by: Ramesh Movies
- Release date: 10 February 1960
- Running time: 141 minutes
- Country: India
- Language: Kannada

Ranadheera Kanteerava is a 1960 Indian Kannada-language historical drama biographical film directed by the editor-turned-director N. C. Rajan and written by G. V. Iyer. It is one of the most popular films of Kannada actor Rajkumar, who plays the role of an emperor Kanthirava Narasaraja I of the Wodeyar dynasty, Mysore, who was fondly known as Ranadheera Kantheerava. The film depicts the life of Kanteerava, who is known for his immense physical strength, particularly in wrestling. The film was credited to be one of the most authentic historical films made since it was entirely based on the documents found in the Mysore Palace. The film also stars Udaykumar, Leelavathi, K. S. Ashwath and Sandhya Shantaram in prominent roles.

The film was released at a time during a severe crisis in the Kannada film industry due to the financial constraints. It was produced through a co-operative forum called Kannada Chalanachitra Kalavidara Sangha formed by actors Rajkumar, Balakrishna, Narasimharaju and writer G. V. Iyer. This was the first venture where Rajkumar turned producer. After its release, the film faced an initial setback as no distributor came forward to screen it. It was later released in a single theatre, Bharath, and performed well commercially. The film is considered the first blockbuster of Kannada cinema. It was also screened at IFFI 1992.

== Plot ==
In 1637, the Kingdom of Mysore is ruled by Maharaja Immadi Raja Wodeyar. However, his inefficiency in administration and womanizing ways have led to Dalavayi Vikramaraya serving as the de facto ruler. Vikramaraya inadvertently poisons the Maharaja to death through Rajamata Thimmaja Ammani. He then appoints wrestler and the deceased Maharaja's cousin Ranadheera Kanteerava, as the new ruler, intending to control him as a puppet.

Kanteerava is a benevolent ruler and is compassionate towards his subjects. He first rules that they pay only a small part of their agricultural income as tax, replacing the existing share of half their income. Upon learning about the poor economic condition of the kingdom, he orders that a new currency made out of gold be minted using the royal jewelry. He appoints his friend Nirisha as prime minister. Vikramaraya, realizing that Kanteerava cannot be controlled, hatches a plan to have him killed through the kingdom's servants. However, the plan backfires, and Vikramaraya is assassinated instead.Years pass and news reaches Kanteerava that a wrestler, Veeramalla, from Tiruchirappalli, in the neighbouring kingdom, has hung his wrestling chaddi at the gate of the city. Anyone entering the city must either pass underneath it in humiliation or fight him in a wrestling match. Kanteerava decides to confront Veeramalla and reaches the city in disguise. He defeats Veeramalla and even an elephant, much to the surprise of the people.

Doddi, a devadasi at a temple in Srirangapatna, desires to learn music from the hesitant music teacher Vishwanatha Shastry. Shastry believes music should be practiced for the benefit of the state and not for entertainment or other purposes. He relents after Doddi promises that she will neither marry nor give in to lust. Kanteerava learns of Doddi's beauty and secretly leaves his palace every night to meet her in disguise. The two fall in love and marry. One of Kanteerava's fathers-in-law is convinced that Doddi is plotting to have him killed, a notion planted in his mind by the now Dalavayi, Nanjaraja. Nanjaraja is conspiring with Senduraimalla, the brother of Veeramalla to kill Kanteerava. Kanteerava narrowly escapes an assassination attempt by killing his attackers, and issues an order to banish Doddi, suspecting her involvement in the plot. However, Upon learning of her innocence, he rushes to find her, only to discover that she has committed suicide.

== Cast ==
- Rajkumar as Ranadheera Kanteerava
- R. Nagendra Rao as Dalavayi Vikramaraya
- Udaykumar as Vishwanatha Shastry
- T. N. Balakrishna as Appanna
- Leelavathi as Doddi
- Sandhya
- Narasimharaju as Kasturi
- H. M. S. Shastry
- K. S. Ashwath as Nirisha
- H. R. Shastry
- Veerabhadrappa
- Kantha Rao
- Papamma
- G. V. Iyer
- Ramadevi as Thimmaja Ammani
- B. V. Radha
- Saroja
- B. K. Eshwarappa
- Sorat Ashwath
- M. S. Subbanna
- Chi. Udayashankar
- Mahalinga Bhagavathar
- Shankara Narayana Rao

== Historical significance ==
Narasaraja Wodeyar I (1638 – 1659) popularly known as Ranadheera Kantheerava was an emperor in the royal Mysuru dynasty. He was a man of immense physical strength and was known as an intense wrestler in the Kingdom. He was an exponent in a form of wrestling called Vajra Mushti. He was also a musician with a strong liking towards arts and literature. He used the Srirangapatna town as his capital. Soon after his death in 1659, all his 10 wives committed Sati and ended their lives.

== Cultural significance ==
This film is credited to have spurred the Kannada cinema industry in the direction of historicals. This was produced as a joint venture under at a time when the Kannada cinema industry was facing severe financial crises and its enormous success is reported to have not only re-instilled confidence in the Kannada cinema industry but inspired other historicals in quick succession. Even today, it stands as a sort of guidepost to making compelling historical dramas in Kannada. The chief merit of Ranadheera Kanteerva is the level of authenticity in several key aspects. The first is the Kannada language used during Kanteerava Narasaraja Wodeyar's days - both by the royalty and the common people. To a keen student of the inflections that Kannada has undergone, this forms a useful study. Equally authentic are the depictions of the protocol, manners, customs, and traditions of palace life. The movie also brings out a few nuances of palace intrigue, tangentially touches upon some aspects of the administrative machinery and the system of espionage by weaving them together in a rather dramatic fashion. This level of detail was made possible due to extensive research and first hand knowledge of the Mysore palace life that the film's writer Sri G.V. Iyer possessed.

== Soundtrack ==
Ranadheera Kantheerava

Soundtrack album by G. K. Venkatesh
- Released: 1960
- Genre: Feature film soundtrack
- Label: Saregama

Ranadheera Kantheerava soundtrack consists of 7 songs all composed by G. K. Venkatesh and written by G. V. Iyer.

Track #	Song	Singer(s)	Lyricist
1	"Radha Madhava"	P. B. Sreenivas, A. P. Komala	G. V. Iyer
2	"Karunada Vairamudi Kantheerava"	Radha Jayalakshmi, Rajalakshmi	G. V. Iyer
3	"Kabbina Billanu"	Sulamangalam Rajalakshmi	G. V. Iyer
4	"Sangeetha Devatheye"	P. B. Sreenivas	G. V. Iyer
5	"Enidu Rosha"	P. B. Sreenivas	G. V. Iyer
6	"Enna Mogava"	Radha Jayalakshmi	G. V. Iyer
7	"Sanchari Manasothe"	S. Janaki	G. V. Iyer

== See also ==
- List of Kannada films of 1960
