= Srirangapatna (disambiguation) =

Srirangapatna, also Shrirangapattana and formerly Seringapatam, is a town in the Mandya district of the Indian state of Karnataka.

Seringapatam may also refer to:

- Srirangapatna Assembly constituency
- Siege of Seringapatam (1799), last stand of Mysore sultan Tipu Sultan at Srirangapatna against the British
  - List of ships named Seringapatam
    - Seringapatam (1799 ship)
    - Seringapatam-class frigate
  - Seringapatam Medal, British East India Company medal for the 1799 battle
- Seringapatam Mutiny, at Nuku Hiva island of the Marquesas Islands (French Polynesia); during the Nuku Hiva Campaign in the War of 1812

== See also ==
- Siege of Seringapatam (disambiguation)
