= Siege of Seringapatam =

Siege of Seringapatam can refer to:

- Siege of Seringapatam (1639), part of the Bijapur–Mysore conflicts
- Siege of Seringapatam (1792) during the Third Anglo-Mysore War
- Siege of Seringapatam (1799) during the Fourth Anglo-Mysore War

== See also ==
- Srirangapatna (disambiguation)
