= Siege of Seringapatam (1639) =

Conflict in India

- Part of Bijapur-Mysore Conflicts
Date	18 January 1639
Location	Srirangapatnam, India
Result	Mysore victory

Belligerents
Bijapur Sultanate	Kingdom of Mysore

Commanders and leaders
Randaula Khan; Shahaji; Afzal Khan; Yaklas Khan; Mustafa Khan; Karithi Khan; Ambar Khan; Parat Khan; Jilahar Khan; Muhammad Khan; Fateh Khan; Siddi Rahima; Siddi Malik Khan; Adam Khan; Vedoji; Raghava Pandita; Ankusa Khan; Balvant Khan	Kanthirava Narasaraja I Nanjarajendra; Lingendra

Strength
40,000; 500 – 1,000 Elephants	

The siege of Seringapatam in 1639 was a conflict between the Bijapur Sultanate's forces, led by Randaula Khan and the Mysorean army commanded by Kanthirava Narasaraja I. The Bijapur army had laid siege to the Seringapatam Fort, but Kanthirava Narasaraja I mounted a daring night attack on their encampment. The surprise assault overwhelmed the Bijapur forces, resulting in their defeat. Following this victory, the Mysorean army triumphantly returned to the Srirangapatna fort.

== Background ==
Kanthirava Narasaraja I incitement of Elenge Hanuma of Basavapatna and other Wodeyars of Ikkeri against their liege lord, Virabhadra Nayaka, led to a brief but intense disturbance in the region. However, the Ikkeri Nayaka swiftly quelled the rebellion, maintaining his control. Undeterred, Kenge Hanuma traveled to Bijapur, seeking the Sultan's aid. Meanwhile, Channama, a fugitive Wodeyar from Nagamangala, recently conquered by Chamaraja Wodeyar VI, also sought refuge with the Sultan. In response, the Sultan dispatched his most reputed general, Randaula Khan, leading an army of forty thousand men, with the mission to restore Kenge Hanuma to power and, if possible, seize Srirangapatna from the Wodeyars.

== Planning ==
Randaula Khan after receiving the Sultan's orders, focused his efforts on the conquest of Srirangapatna, recognizing that capturing the city would be crucial for weakening the Wodeyars' hold over their territories. Aware that seizing the capital would not be an easy task, he carefully planned his approach, considering various strategies to bring the ruling forces under control. Khan reasoned that once Srirangapatna fell it would serve as a stronghold from which they could gradually annex the surrounding regions. His plan was to strike decisively, ensuring that the fall of the capital would lead to the eventual collapse of the Mysore Kingdom facilitating Bijapur's expansion.

Randaula Khan, in a council of war held in his tent, briefed the Wazirs on the strong resolve and fortitude of Kanthirava Narasaraja I, as well as the unwavering loyalty of his generals and ministers. This crucial information, likely gathered from Channaiah, Khan emphasized the strength of the Wodeyar leadership to ensure his forces were prepared for battle.

=== Review of the army ===
Instructing the Wazirs, Randaula Khan expressed his intention to review the forces that various chieftains had assembled for the battlefield. Among them was Shahaji who commanded a substantial army, consisting of 6,000 horsemen, 7,000 to 8,000 foot soldiers, and 10 elephants. This formidable force was a key component of the overall strength that Khan planned to deploy in the campaign against Srirangapatna.

=== March of Bijapur army ===
After reviewing his forces, Randaula Khan ordered his entire army to march toward Srirangapatna. The army advanced through Channapatna, devastating the surrounding villages along the way, looting whatever valuables they could find. As they neared the city of Srirangapatna, their march became a path of destruction, further weakening the region's defenses before the siege.

Upon learning of the Bijapur army's encampment near Srirangapatna, Kanthirava Narasaraja I swiftly made extensive preparations to confront the enemy. he fortified the city, rallied his generals and ministers, and mobilized his forces to defend the capital.

== Diplomacy ==
Tremendous preparations were made on both sides as the conflict loomed. Randaula Khan seeking to negotiate before the battle, sent his envoys to the court of Kanthirava of Mysore. The envoys delivered a message, urging the king to surrender and avoid further bloodshed, offering terms of peace in exchange for his cooperation. They warned that if Kanthirava Narasaraja I refused, the consequences would be dire for his kingdom.

The envoy's told king as follows:

"Obedient to the orders of the Sultan of Bijapur, we took possession of many kingdoms in the Karnataka. Hearing the news of your prowess, we felt happy. Making friendship with and taking treaty from you, we will proceed with your army for further conquests. These are the words of our lord."

Upon hearing the envoys' message, Kanthirava Narasaraja gave a spirited and defiant reply:

"We do not pay tribute nor agree to make friendship with vou either. However if you want to know our stuff, ask your lord to go to war with us together with all his forces, Has he come to lay siege to our city thinking that he would accord the same treatment as he had accorded to the poor kings of the surrounding kingdoms? His prowess is dried up."

The envoy's were send back to their back to their camp.

Randaula Khan asked the envoys who had appeared before him as follows:

"What is the opinion of the king, Peace or War ?"

When the envoys returned and relayed Kanthirava's response, Randaula Khan's anger grew. Furious at the rejection of his terms, he swiftly convened a council of war with his Wazirs. the decision was made to abandon any further attempts at negotiation. Randaula Khan resolved that the only remaining option was to storm the fort of Srirangapatna planning a direct assault to break the resistance and secure victory by force.

== Siege ==
=== Beginning of the siege operations ===
The decision to storm the fort was swiftly executed. Randaula Khan's Wazirs quickly mobilized their forces and surrounded the fort of Srirangapatna. The air was thick with the chaos of war-elephants trumpeted, war-drums beat, and trumpets blared, creating a deafening uproar that filled the battlefield. The sounds of impending conflict reverberated across the land, signaling the doom that loomed over the fort.

==== Advise of Hanumappa Nayaka ====
Upon learning of the commander's firm resolution, Hanumappa Nayaka met with Randaula Khan and said:

"Why do you persist on laying siege to the town ? Make peace (honourably)."

By this time, Hanumappa Nayaka recognized the futility of waging war against the determined Mysorean army. He urged caution, advising against further conflict, but his words were ignored by those around him. Randaula Khan resolute in his decision, disregarded the counsel and hastened to launch the assault.

==== Strength of Bijapur army ====
The besieging army was a vast and diverse force, numbering between 40,000 and 50,000 horsemen and 500 to 1,000 elephants. It was divided into two main sections: the first, the original Bijapur army led by Randaula Khan and Shahaji and the second, a coalition of forces from various Karnataka chieftains, commanded by Hanumappa Nayaka. This formidable alliance was determined to overpower the defenses of Srirangapatna and bring the city under their control.

==== Strength of Mysore army ====
The Mysore army was composed of a diverse array of contingents from various regions, including the chiefs of Eura, Channapatna, Maddur, Satyagala, Heggadadevanakote, Channarayapatna, Kikkert, Bukana Kere, Piriyapatna, Talakad, Malavalli, and Nagamangala. In addition to these regional forces, there were also troops raised by the general Nanjarajendra in charge of Srirangapatna and Mysore.

==== Bijapur army laid siege to the cities of Seringapatam and Mysore ====
On January 18, 1639, Randaula Khan's forces laid siege to both the forts of Srirangapatna and Mysore simultaneously. However, the attack was met with fierce resistance, and the Bijapur army was repulsed with heavy losses. On the first day, the defeated forces retreated, encamping at Palya. In addition to the main army, several smaller divisions of the Bijapur forces were dispersed across the surrounding areas of Mysore and Srirangapatna.

General Nanjarajendra seized the opportunity presented by the precarious position of the besieging forces and launched a series of devastating night attacks. A section of the Mysore army targeted the Bijapur camp at Arakere and cut off the noses of those who fell into their hands, while another struck at Hosaholalu and yet another surprised the Muslims at Yadavagiri (Melukote). These raids, marked by brutal cruelty, inflicted severe losses on the Bijapur army in several encampments. Despite facing repeated setbacks and strong opposition from his own men, Randaula Khan remained steadfast in his determination, refusing to alter his plans for the siege.

Randaula Khan, determined to breach the fort, appointed his most reputed generals to key positions, ensuring the siege intensified. The assault on Srirangapatna grew fiercer as the Khans and Wazirs launched a coordinated attack. Yakalas Khan, Mustafa Khan, and others scaled the ramparts from one side, while Karithi Khan, Shahaji, and Afzal Khan tackled the walls from another.

Witnessing the determined efforts of the Bijapur forces, Nanjarajendra swiftly ordered his generals to take action against the besieging army. The Mysore generals and their troops fought with great courage, engaging the enemy fiercely. They inflicted heavy casualties, slaughtering those who fell into their hands, and successfully repulsed the remaining Bijapur forces from the surrounding areas of the fort.

The brutal slaughter and defeat inflicted by the Mysorean forces shattered the Bijapur army's hopes of making any significant progress in the kingdom of Mysore. In the face of this dire situation, Randaula Khan summoned his most prominent generals for a council. They deliberated on their next course of action, strategizing how to overcome the setbacks:

"It is impossible to prolong the war against Kanthirava Narasaraja who is very powerful. It is right that we should make peace with him some how or other."

Channaiah of Nagamangala, who had played a key role in instigating the invasion of Mysore found himself increasingly bewildered by the mounting difficulties of the campaign. Fearing disgrace if Randaula Khan's proposals for peace with the king of Mysore were accepted, Channaiah appealed to the commander-in-chief, urging him not to seek a settlement. He said:

"Do not make peace today. I will get into the fort of Srirangapatna, understand the secrecy and send word to you to get into the fort."

On Saturday, January 19, 1639, Channaiah entered the fort and immediately sent word to Randaula Khan, urging him to rush into the fort and join the battle. Randaula Khan eager to seize the opportunity and strike at the enemy, entered the fort with his forces, ready to engage in combat. With swift action, he launched an attack.

Nanjarajendra met the besieging forces head-on in a fierce and brutal battle, where hundreds of Muslims either lost their noses or perished. The Bijapur army, shaken by the heavy losses and unable to maintain their position, fled the battlefield in disarray. This marked a victory for the king of Mysore, as the fort was freed from the clutches of the Bijapuris. The Mysore army, now victorious, took up positions around the fort, ensuring that no further attacks from the aggressors.

==== Night attack on Bijapur army ====
After suffering heavy losses in both men and materials, the Bijapur army retreated and encamped a few miles away, about three miles from the city. Weakened and demoralized by their defeat, they regrouped at a safe distance.

General Nanjarajendra informed King Kanthirava Narasaraja I of the events at the fort and urged him to seize the golden opportunity to drive the Bijapur forces out before dawn. Recognizing the strategic moment, Kanthirava personally led his army to the battlefield. He divided his forces into two sections: one under Nanjarajendra and the other under Lingendra, positioning them on either side of the Bijapur encampment. On January 20, 1639, Kanthirava led the charge.

When Nanjarajendra launched a night attack on the Bijapur camp, it caught Randaula Khan off guard, but as a resourceful and enterprising general, he quickly regained his composure. Mobilizing the scattered elements of his army and rousing his soldiers from their deep slumber, he prepared to face the overwhelming Mysore forces. At this critical moment Randaula Khan found himself at a crossroads either to face total annihilation or master the situation. The Khans and Wazirs, in desperation fought valiantly to repel the Mysorean onslaught. The battlefield became a scene of chaos and confusion, with arrows flying and the sounds of battle echoing through the night, leaving thousands on both sides wounded or dead.

"The Muslims cried out "Thinking that we have suffered enough at the siege of the city, you have come to attack us, yet we are quite prepared to give you battle and take off your heads."

Despite fierce resistance, the Bijapur forces were ultimately overwhelmed by the superior might of the Mysore army. Fortune favored the Mysoreans as they routed the Muslim forces, sending them into full retreat. The battlefield was littered with the bodies of the fallen, marking a disastrous defeat for the Muslims. Kanthirava Narasaraja I returned triumphantly to the city with the remnants of his victorious army. The spoils of war were presented before the king, who, filled with joy at the success, rewarded the prominent chiefs and warriors with generous gifts in recognition of their bravery and contributions to the victory.

== Aftermath ==
Randaula Khan having lost hundreds of his best soldiers, as well as trained horses and elephants on the battlefield, could not bear the weight of his defeat and the shame it brought. In great agony and distress, he returned to Hanumappa Nayaka and expressed his sorrow :

"Oh Nayak! what you have said before is true, since my departure from Vijayapur( Bijapur) up to this day, may, ever since my birth up to this day I have never seen a hero of this type."

On January 21, Randaula Khan realizing the futility of continuing the siege, sought peace with Kanthirava Narasaraja I after receiving a direct order from Bijapur to return. Following the advice of Kenge-Hanumappa Nayaka, he arranged a truce through two of Kanthirava's agents, Kaveri-Hebbaruva and Minchu-Hebbaruva. The terms stipulated that the territory south of the Cauvery River would remain under the undisturbed control of Mysore while the revenue from the land north of the river would belong to Bijapur after necessary administrative expenses. Kanthirava agreed to the truce, recognizing that it ensured the territorial integrity of Mysore and spared him from the risk of another prolonged siege. In mid-February, following the terms of the truce, Randaula Khan lifted the siege of Seringapatam. having secured an agreement with Kanthirava Narasaraja I the Bijapur forces began to withdraw. The end of the siege marked the conclusion of a failed campaign for Randaula Khan, as he retreated with his forces, leaving Mysore intact and its sovereignty preserved. Randaula Khan returned to Bijapur burdened by the calamity that had befallen him and his army.

== See also ==
- Kanthirava Narasaraja I
- Randaula Khan
- Mysore Kingdom
- Bijapur Sultanate
