= Lakshmikanta Temple, Kalale =

Lakshmikanta Temple
- Hindu temple
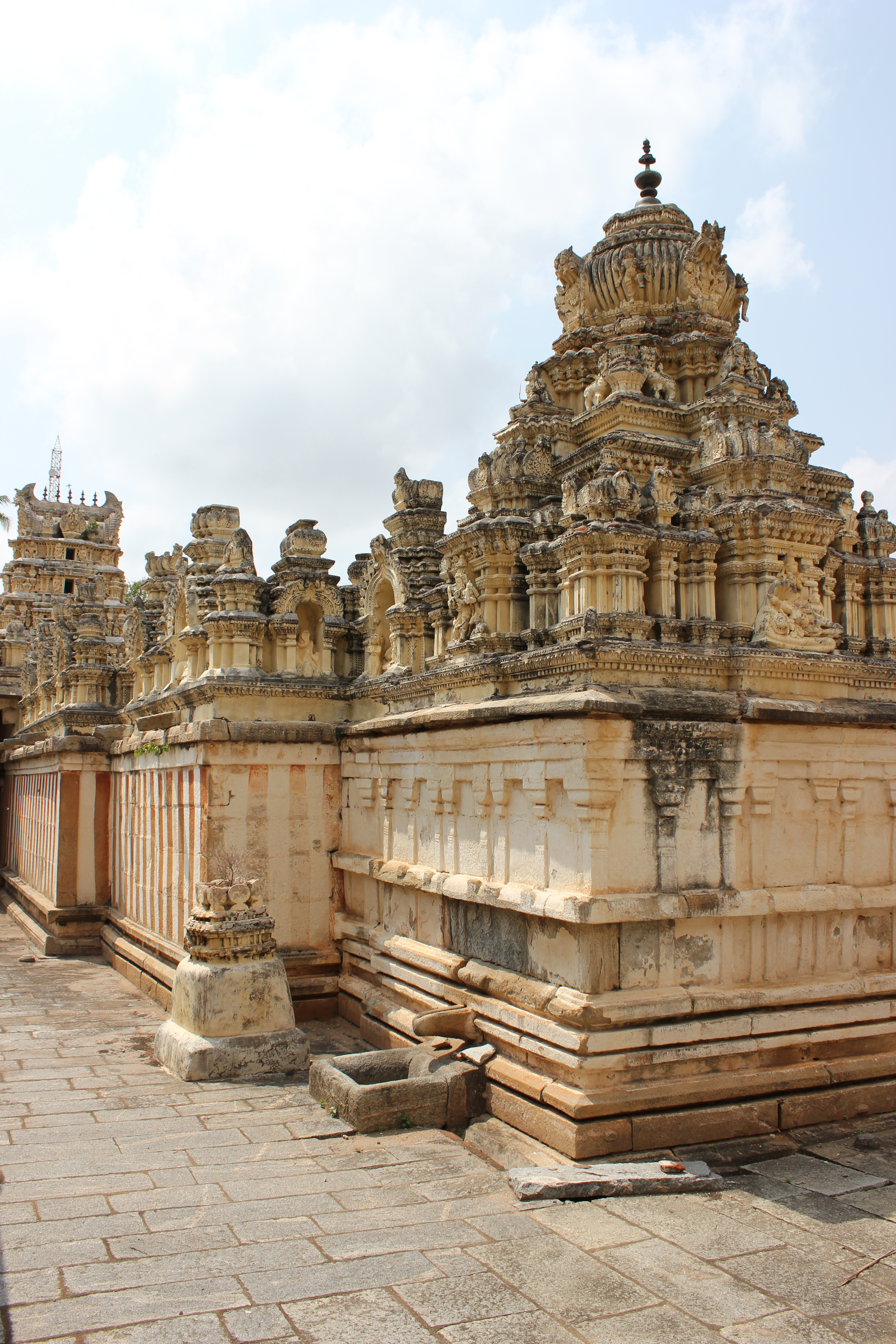
- Dravidian architecture of Lakshmikanta temple

- Location in Karnataka, India
- Coordinates: 12°05′0″N 76°40′0″E
- Country: India
- State: Karnataka
- District: Mysore
- Talukas: Nanjangud

Languages
  - Official: Kannada
- Time zone: UTC+5:30 (IST)

The Lakshmikanta Temple is a Hindu (Vaishnava) temple in Kalale, a village in the Nanjangud taluk of the Mysore district, Karnataka state, India. The temple dates back at least to the early 18th century and is built in typical dravidian style. The temple is a protected monument under the Karnataka state division of the Archaeological Survey of India.

== History ==
The Lakshmikanta temple was under the patronage of some of the kings of the Mysore Kingdom. It was expanded and lavish grants were made by king Dodda Krishnaraja I of the Mysore Wodeyar dynasty before c.1732. In the early 18th century, Dalavoy (feudal lord) Devarajiah of the powerful Kalale family donated the impressive metallic figure of the Hindu god Rama to the temple during his last years. In 1791, the de facto ruler of Mysore, Tipu Sultan, gave the temple gifts in silver including four cups, a plate and a spittoon (padiga), as per inscriptions on the gifts themselves as part of a larger set of gifts to Hindu temples.

== Gallery ==
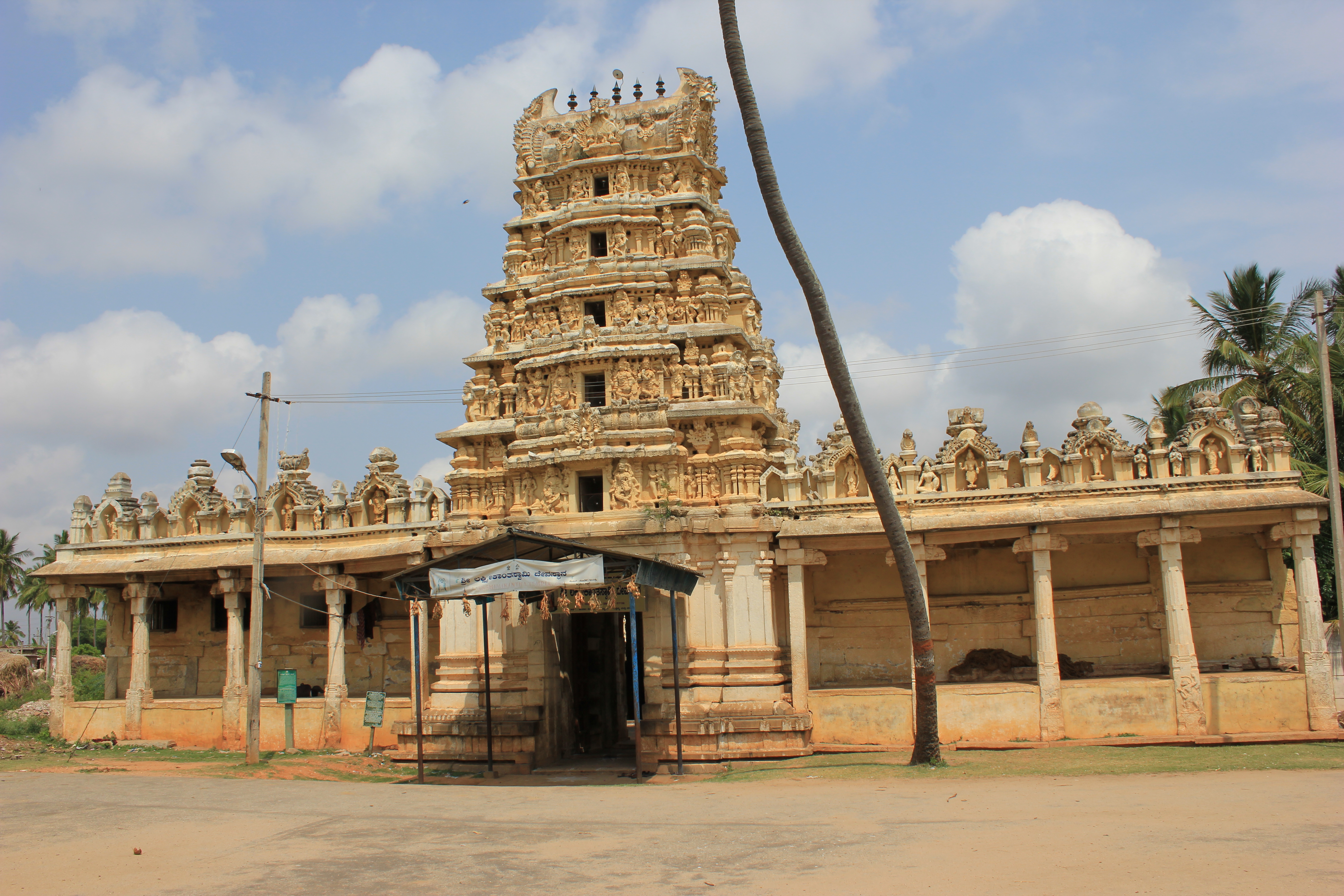
Gopura (tower over entrance) of the Lakshmikanta temple at Kalale

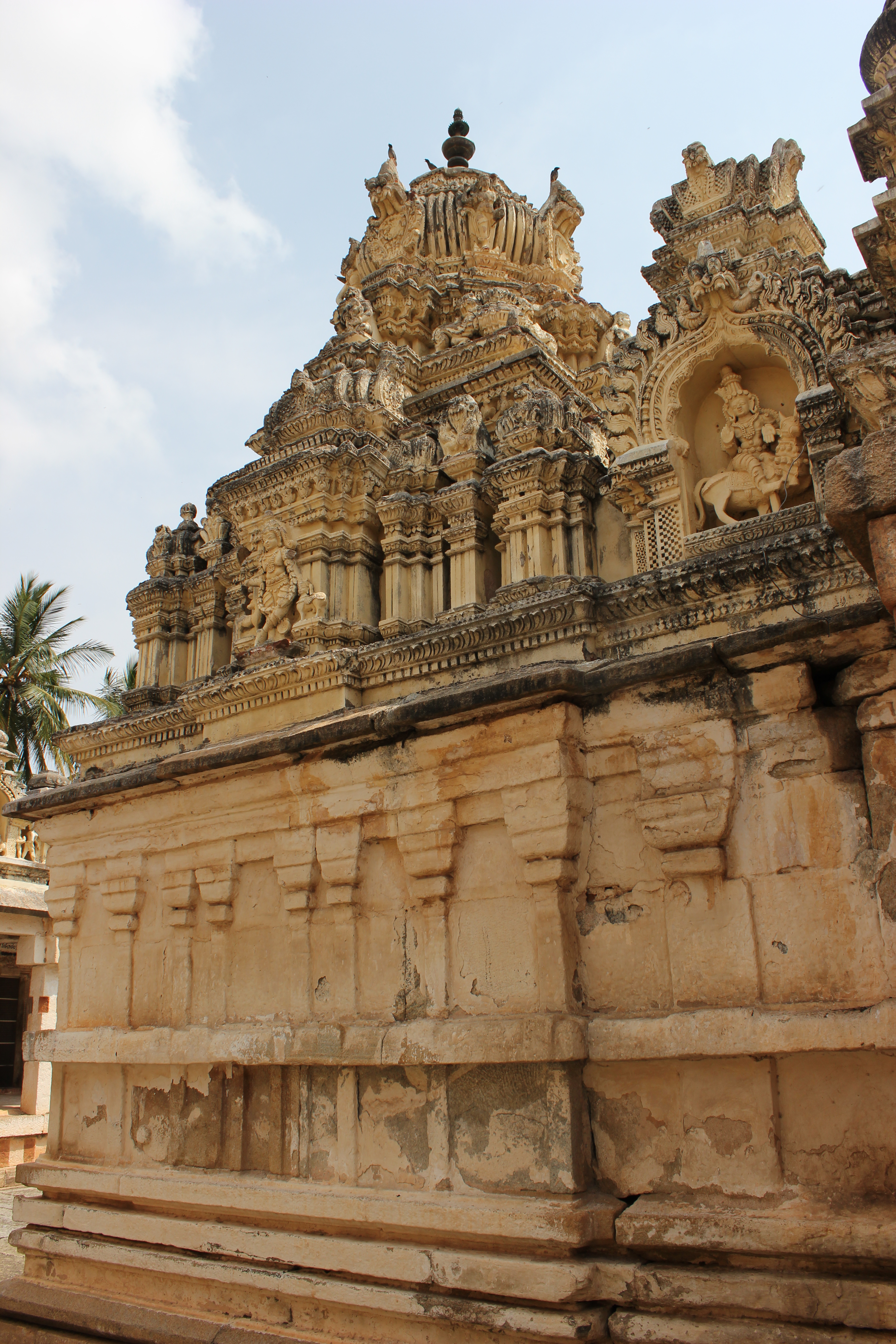
Dravidian style shrine and superstructure in Lakshmikanta temple at Kalale

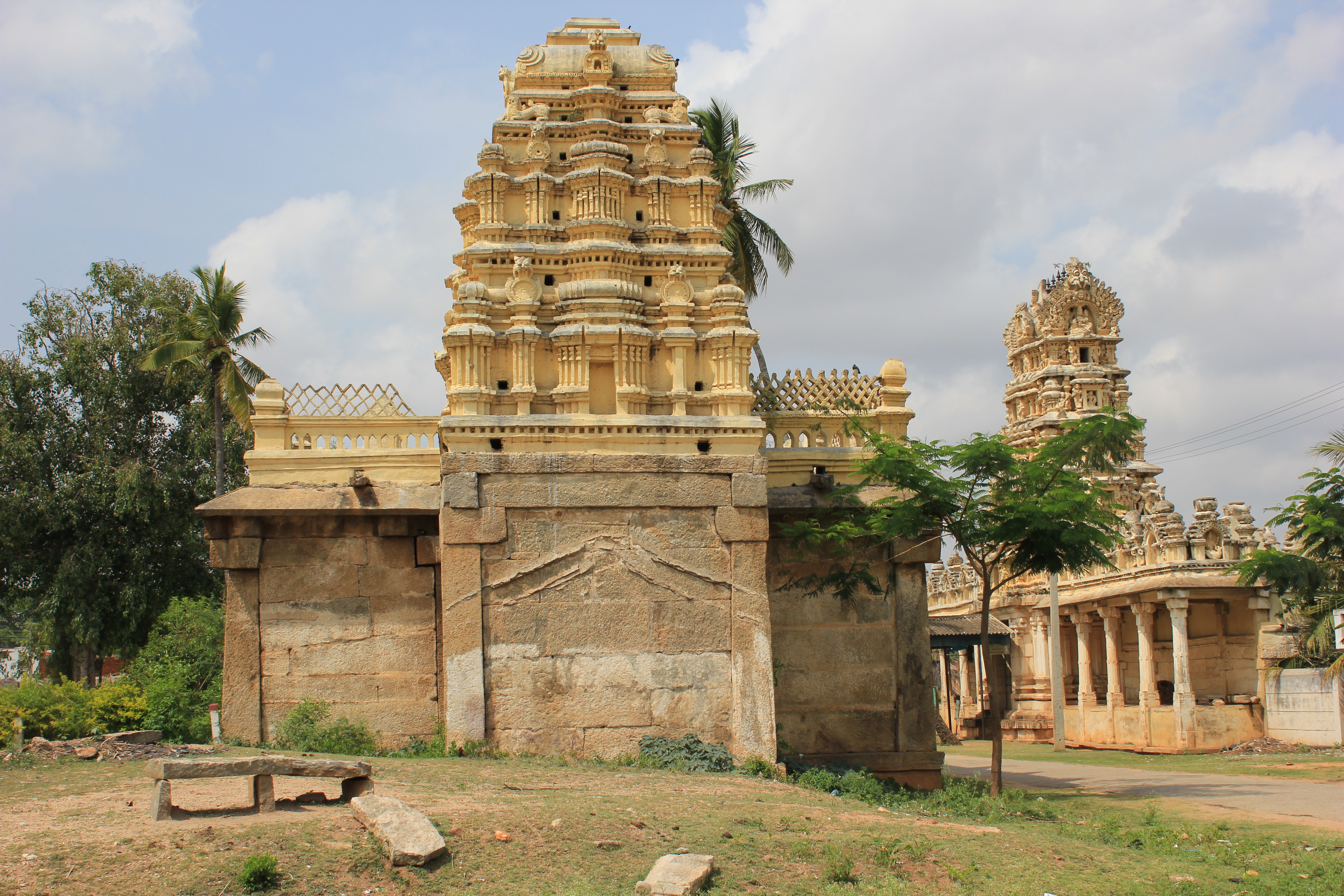
View of Lakshmikanta temple and related structures at Kalale
