= Arakeshwara Temple, Haleyedatore =

Arakeshwara Temple
- Hindu temple
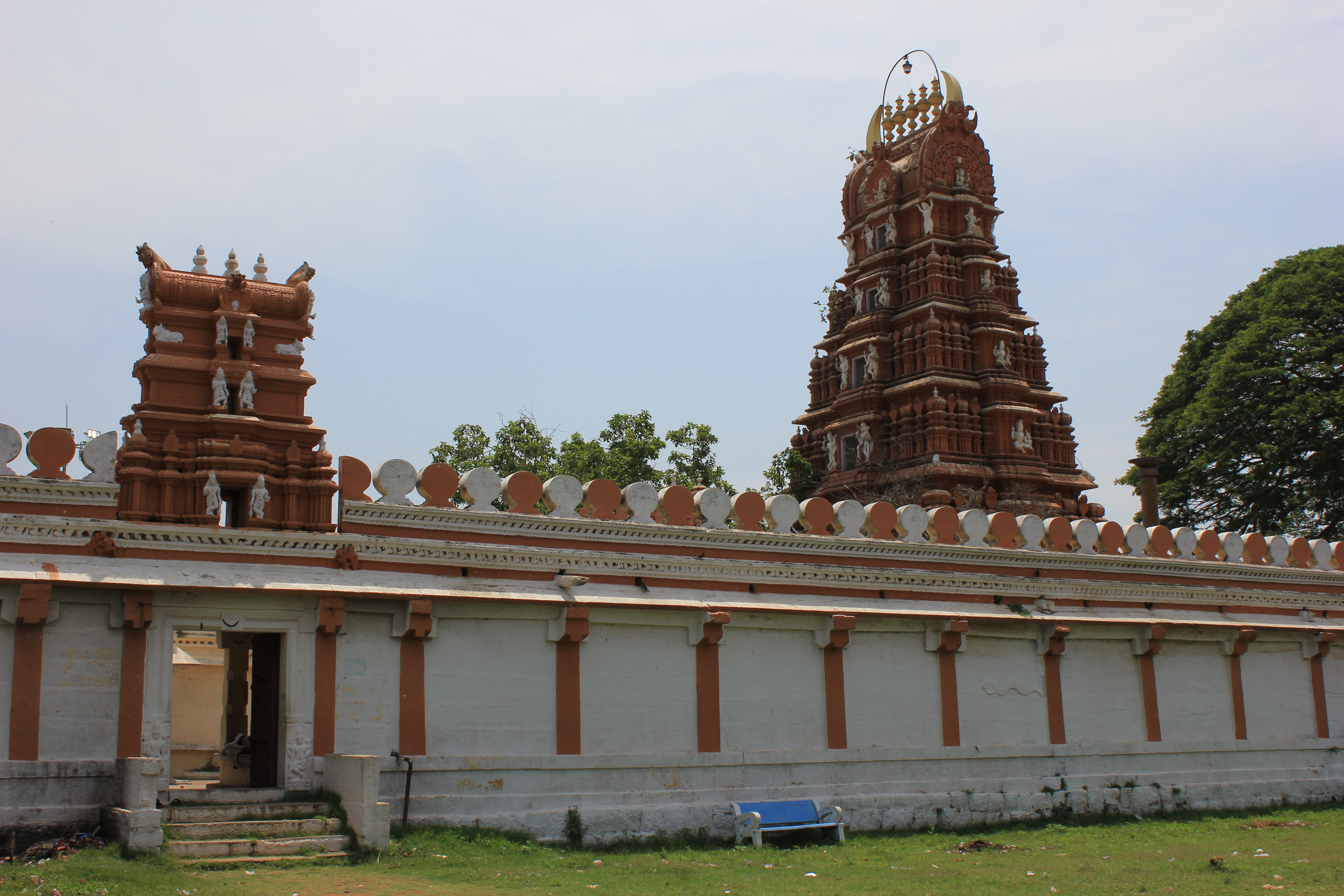
- Dravidian architecture of Arakeshwara temple (early 12th century or earlier)

- Location in Karnataka, India
- Coordinates: 12.46°N 76.39°E
- Country: India
- State: Karnataka
- District: Mysore
- Talukas: Krishnaraja Nagara

Languages
  - Official: Kannada
- Time zone: UTC+5:30 (IST)

Hale Yedatore, a village in the Krishnaraja Nagara taluk of the Mysore district, Karnataka state, India is located about four kilometers north of the commercially important newly built town of Krishnarajanagara, and about 44 km north-west of the historically important city of Mysore. The name Yedatore derives from two Kannada language words, yeda (lit, "left") and tore (lit, "river") – a name that arises from the "bend to the left" made by the river at that spot which is considered sacred by Hindus. There are steps leading from the temple down to the bathing areas ("ghats") by the river. Yedatore village was severely damaged in the 1920s from the flood waters of the River Kaveri, prompting the Mysore ruler to build the new town, named Krishnarajanagar, little southerly on an elevated land.

The Arakeshwara Temple is a Hindu temple in Hale Yedatore. The present temple complex dates back at least to early 19th century rule of the Mysore Kingdom and is built in typical dravidian style. According to the British Raj era historian and epigraphist B. Lewis Rice, the temple was endowed by Maharaja Krishnaraja Wodeyar III, the ruler of the princely Mysore, during the British rule over India. However, the original temple as such is much older, of the era of Kulottunga Chola I. The Arakeshwara temple is a protected monument under the Karnataka state division of the Archaeological Survey of India.

Yadatore Sri Yogandeshwara Saraswathi samasthanam in Krishnarajanagar, Mysore District is also located on the banks of Kaveri, opposite to Arakeshwara Temple, westerly. Yadatore Shri Mutt is one of several institutions that follow Sri Shankara’s adhvaita tradition. Many highly learned ascetics adorned this Peeta, which has a history of more than 700 years. Of them Sri Rama Brahmanda, who installed a very rare idol of Sri Chaturbhuja Pattabhirama and Sri Neelakanteshwara at Holenarasipura on the banks of river Hamavathi, is of legendary fame.

== Gallery ==
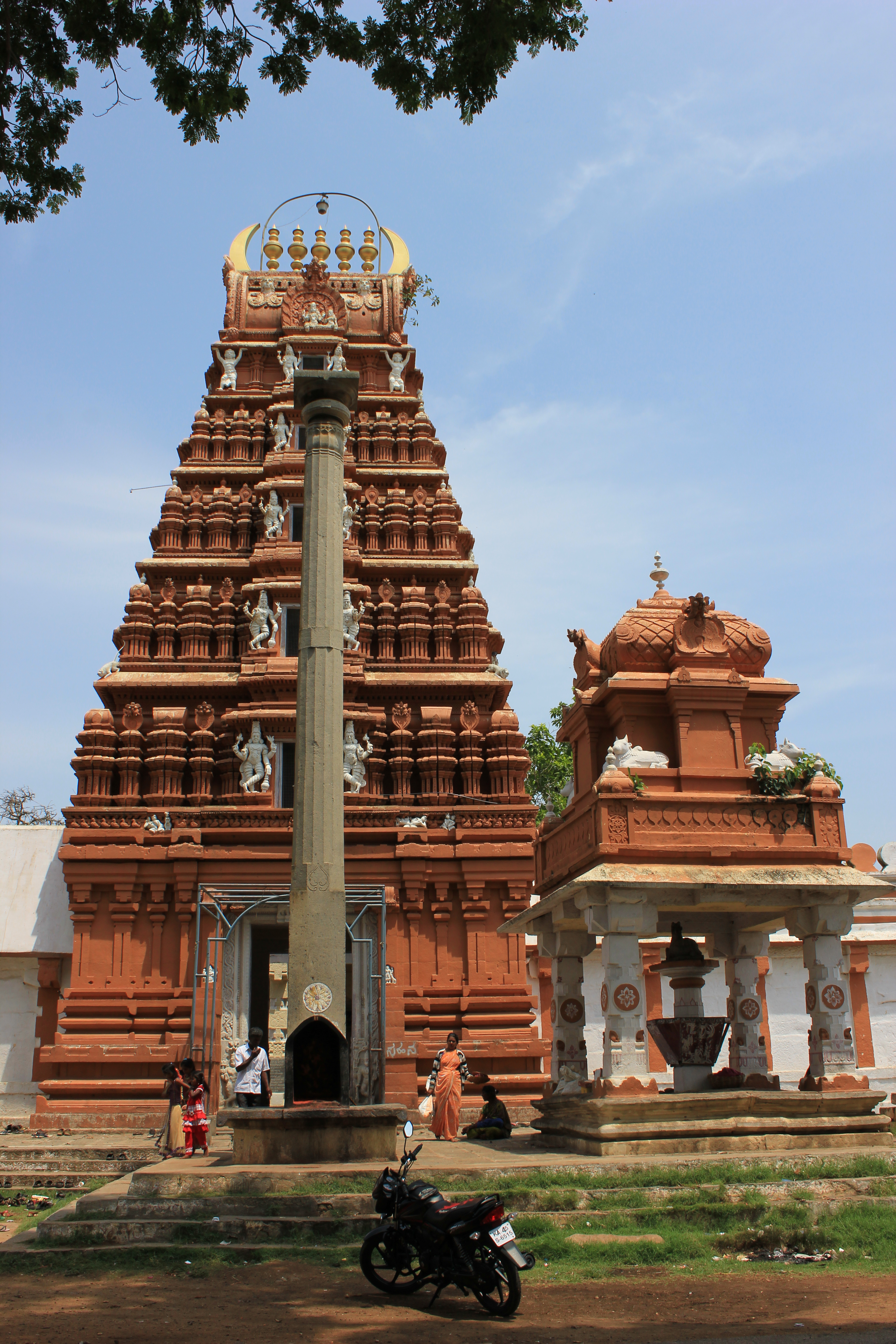
Dravida Gopura over entrance to Arakeshwara temple at Haleyedatore in Mysore district

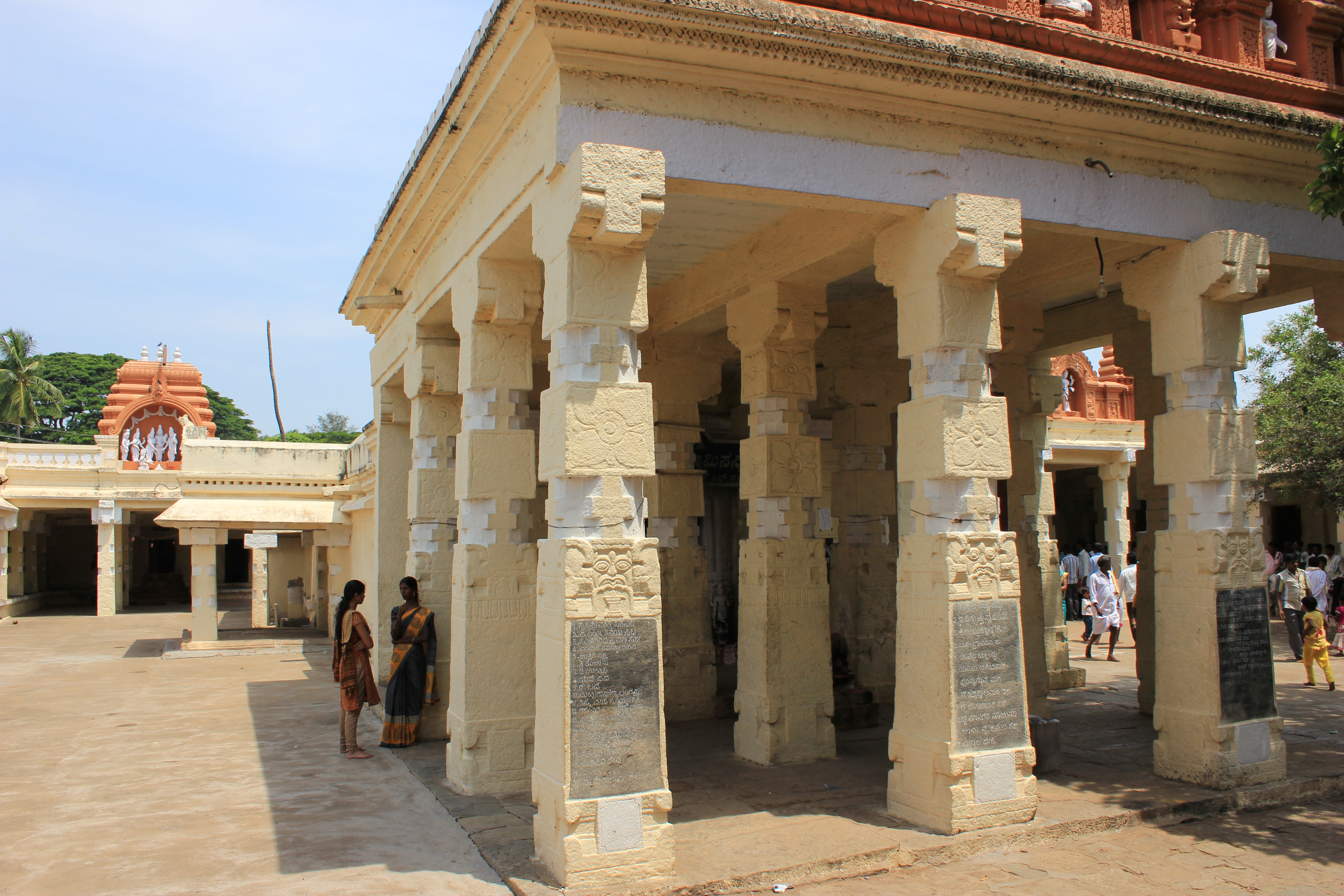
Entrance to mantapa and shrine through massive pillared mukhamantapa in Arakeshwara temple at Haleyedatore in Mysore district
