= List of ships named Seringapatam =

Several ships have been named Seringapatam for the Siege of Seringapatam (1799):

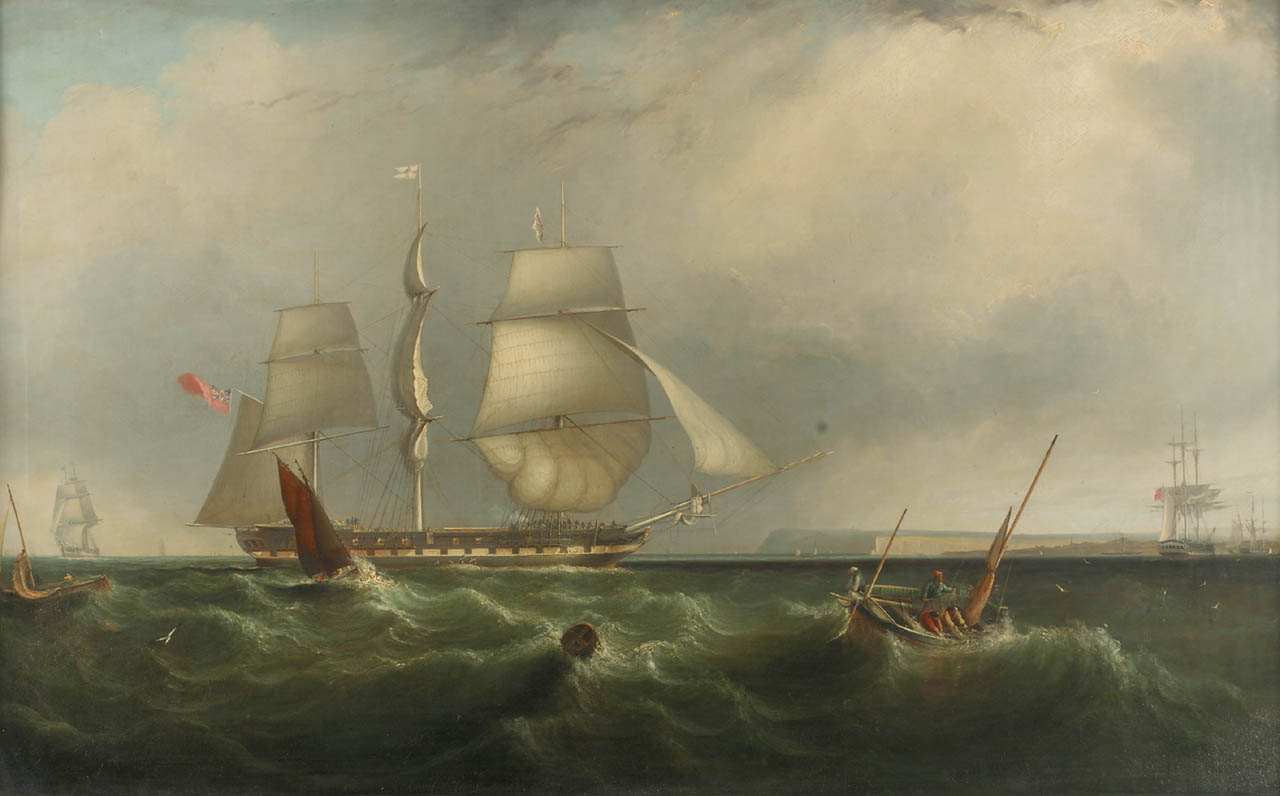
The East Indiaman Seringapatam (1837) built by Richard Green

- Seringapatam (1799 ship) was built in India and became a whaling ship, making 15 whaling voyages between 1800 and 1846. The US Navy captured her in 1813 in the Pacific and she briefly became the USS Seringapatam, the only US Navy vessel ever to be commanded by a captain from the US Marine Corps. A mutiny by prisoners of war resulted in her returning to her British owners. She was laid up in 1850 and sold for a hulk in 1860
- HMS Seringapatam, a Royal Navy frigate launched at Bombay in 1819
- Seringapatam, of 81889/94 or 871 tons (bm), was launched at London in 1837 as an East Indiaman. On 26 April 1846, Seringapatam collided with the Danish East Indiaman barque Harriet in the English Channel off Beachy Head, Sussex. Harriet capsized and was subsequently beached between Brighton and Hove. Her crew were rescued.
- Seringapatam, of 356 tons (bm), (or 454 – new measure) was launched at Hull in 1842.
- Seringapatam, of 508 tons (bm), or 587 tons (GRT), was launched at Greenock in 1849

== See also ==
- Seringapatam-class frigate
