= Group of temples at the Amba Vilas Palace, Mysore =

Shveta Varahaswamy and others
- Hindu temples
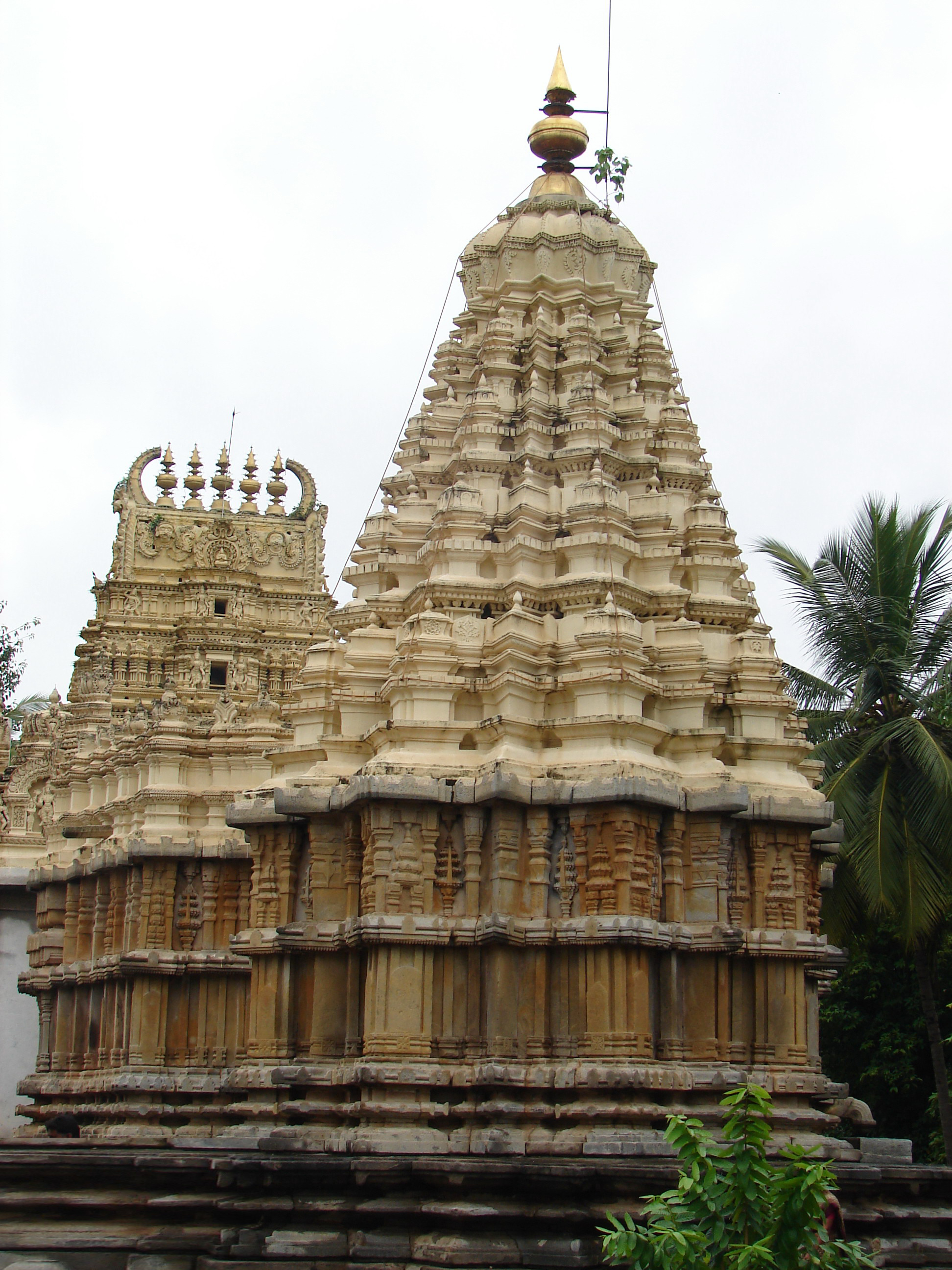
- Group of temples in Amba Vilas Palace, Mysore, Mysore district
- Country: India
- State: Karnataka
- District: Mysore District

Languages
  - Official: Kannada
- Time zone: UTC+5:30 (IST)

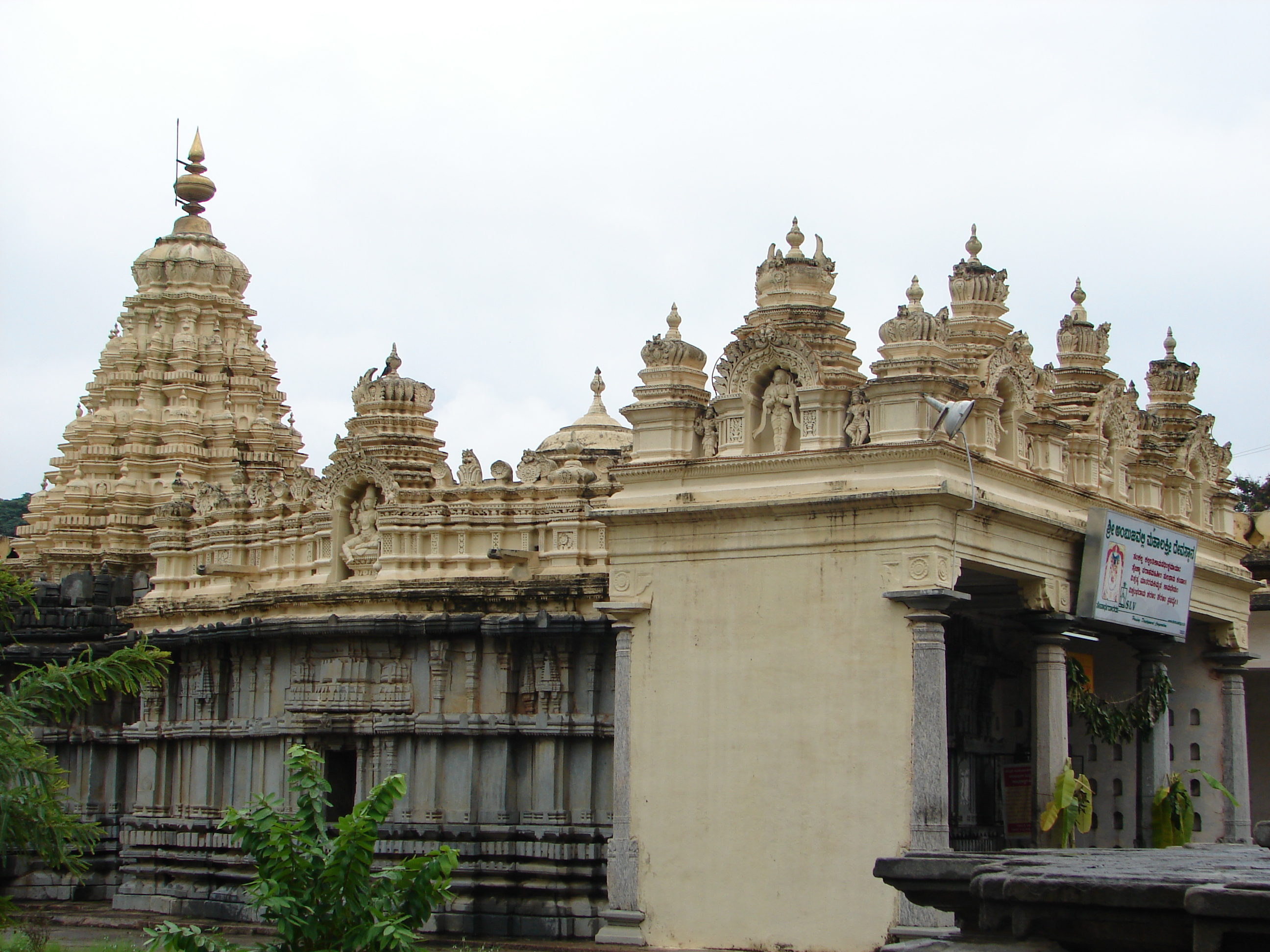
The Mahalakshmi temple, Amba Vilas Palace, Mysore

The group of temples at the Amba Vilas Palace in Mysore were constructed during various periods by the kings of the Wodeyar dynasty (Wadiyar in English) who ruled the Kingdom of Mysore from about 1399 to 1947 A.D. These temples are protected monuments under the Karnataka state division of the Archaeological Survey of India.

== History ==
The Lakshmiramana Swamy temple (an avatar of the Hindu god Vishnu), consecrated in 1499 during the rule of Chamaraja Wodeyar II (r.1478-1513), is the oldest in this group of temples (from the Banni mantapa inscription). The temple finds an important place in the history of the Palace because the coronation of Krishnaraja Wodeyar III (r.1799-1868) was in this temple on 30 June 1799. According to another account, Vijayanagara king Tuluva Narasa Nayaka (r.1491-1503), father of the famous Vijayanagara King Krishnadevaraya (r.1509-1529) built the temple. King Narasaraja Wodeyar I (r.1638-1659) added the mantapa (hall) and King Krishnaraja Wodeyar III built the tower over the mahadwara (grand entrance) in 1851.

According to the Archaeological Survey of India, the Shveta Varahaswamy temple was constructed in the Hoysala style during the rule of Chikkadevararaja Wodeyar (r.1673-1704). The temple is known for its ornate doorjamb, pillars in the mantapa, and the murals that depict scenes from the Hindu epics and adorn the inner walls of the mantapa. According to another account, Dewan Purniah (from 1799 to 1813), the first Dewan of Mysore, built this temple as per the wishes of King Krishnaraja Wodeyar, using materials from a ruined Hoysala temple in Shimoga.

The Trinayaneshvara Swamy temple was built before the reign of Raja Wodeyar (1569) and was originally located outside the palace fort grounds. When the perimeter of the fort was extended by King Kanthirava Narasaraja I (reigned 1659–1673) and his successor Dodda Devaraja Wodeyar, the temple become a part of fort around the palace grounds. From an inscription at the temple, it is known that the consecration of the Prasanna Krishanswamy temple by Krishnaraja Wodeyar III (1829) has to do the legendary connection the Wodeyar family has with the Yadu race. Of importance in the temple are the crawling image of the child god Krishna, forty bronze images of Hindu deities and saints, and the murals of 19th century.

The construction of the Kille Venkataramana Swamy temple (a form of the Hindu god Vishnu) took place during a time of great political intrigue in Mysore. By 1760, the Mysore royal family had been sidelined by the ambitious officer Hyder Ali (regent, 1760–1782). After Hyder Ali, his Tipu Sultan (regent, 1782–1799) continued to wield full power over the Kingdom of Mysore, making the Wodeyar rulers powerless. Legend has it during this time, Lakshmammanni, queen of King Krishnaraja Wodeyar II (reigned 1734–1766), dreamed of the god Venkataramana who instructed her to bring his image from a temple at nearby Balmuri and dedicate it in the Palace grounds. In return, the Wodeyar family would become free to rule Mysore again. In 1799, after the death of Tipu Sultan in the Fourth Anglo-Mysore War, the British reinstated the Wodeyar family on the Mysore throne. The Bhuvaneshwari temple (1951) and the Gayatri temple (1953) were constructed by the last ruler of the dynasty, Jayachamarajendra Wodayer.

Temples of the Amba Vilas Palace, Mysore (1499-1947 CE)
Name	Patron	Architecture	Year
Lakshmiramana Swamy	Chamaraja Wodeyar II	Dravidian	1499
Trinayaneshvara Swamy	pre Raja Wodeyar	Dravidian	pre 1578
Shveta Varahaswamy	Chikkadevaraja Wodeyar	Hoysala	1673-1704
Mahalakshmi	Chikkadevaraja Wodeyar	Hoysala	1673-1704
Kille Venkatramana Swamy	Krishnaraja Wodeyar II	Dravidian	1734-1766
Prasanna Krishanswami	Krishnaraja Wodeyar III	Dravidian	1829
Bhuvaneshwari	Jayachamarajendra Wodeyar	Dravidian	1951
Gayathri	Jayachamarajendra Wodeyar	Dravidian	1953

== Gallery ==
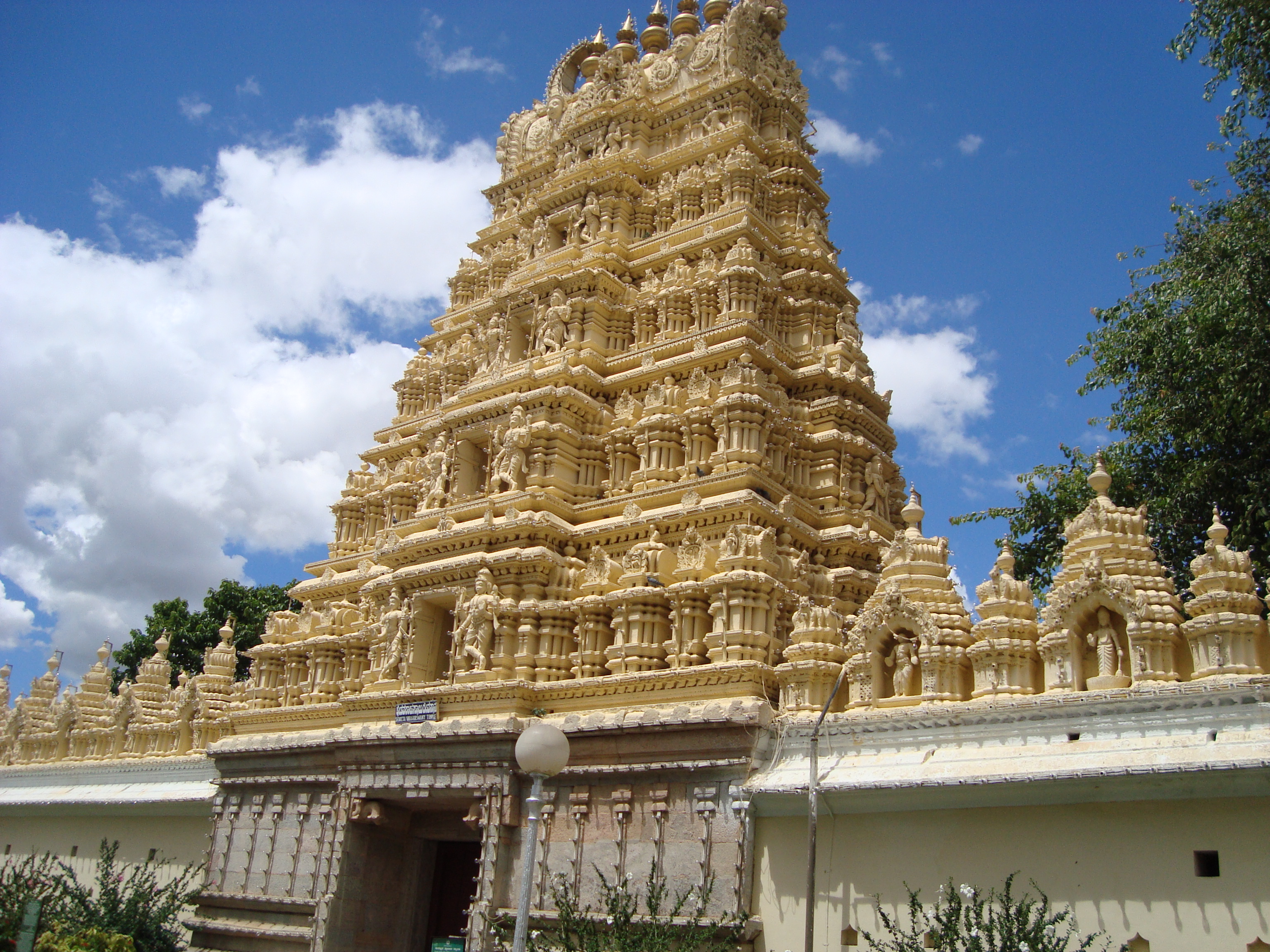
The gopuram (tower over gate) at the Shveta Varahaswamy temple, Amba Vilas Palace, Mysore

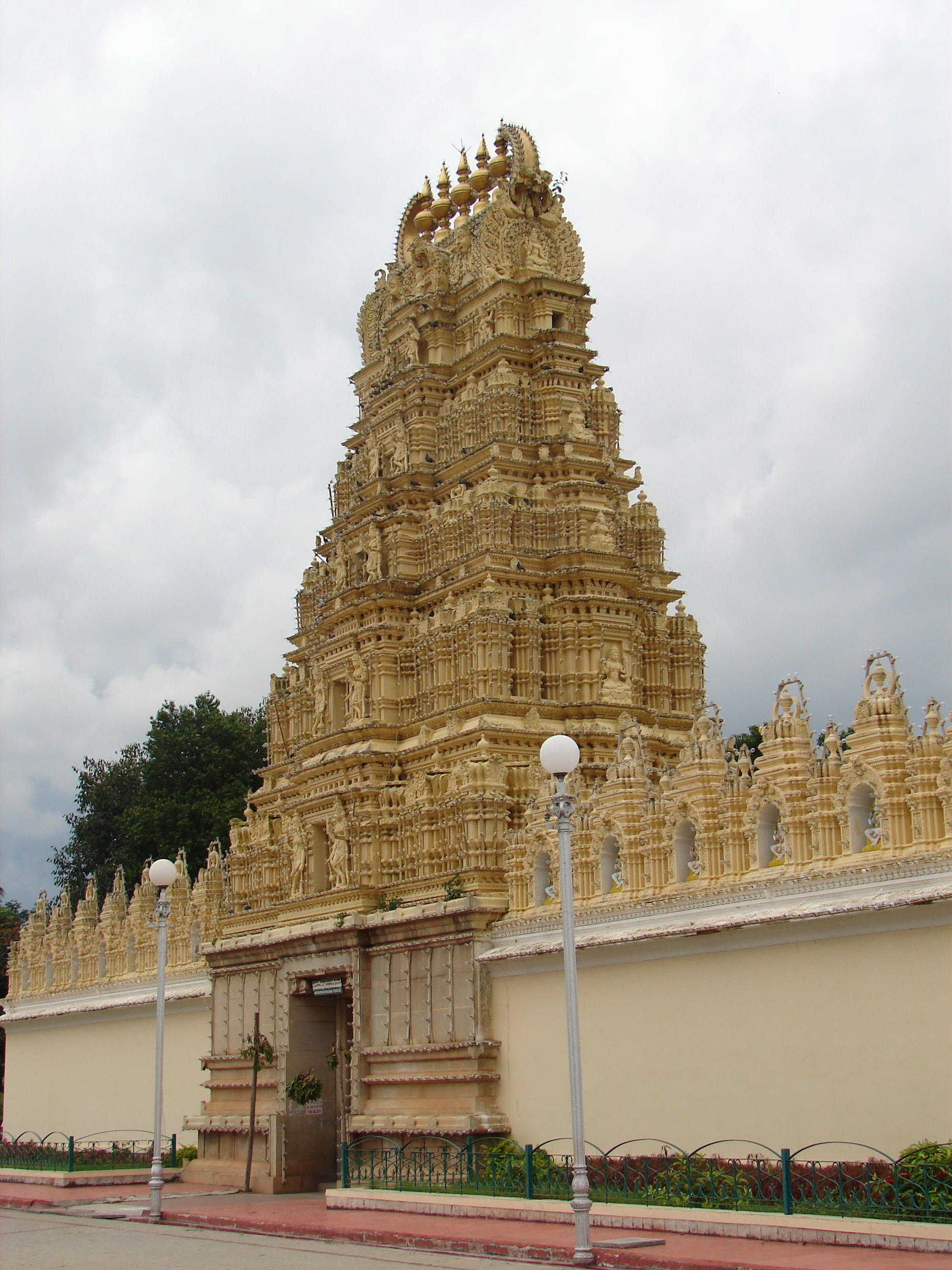
The gopuram over entrance gate of Bhuvaneshwari temple, Amba Vilas Palace, Mysore

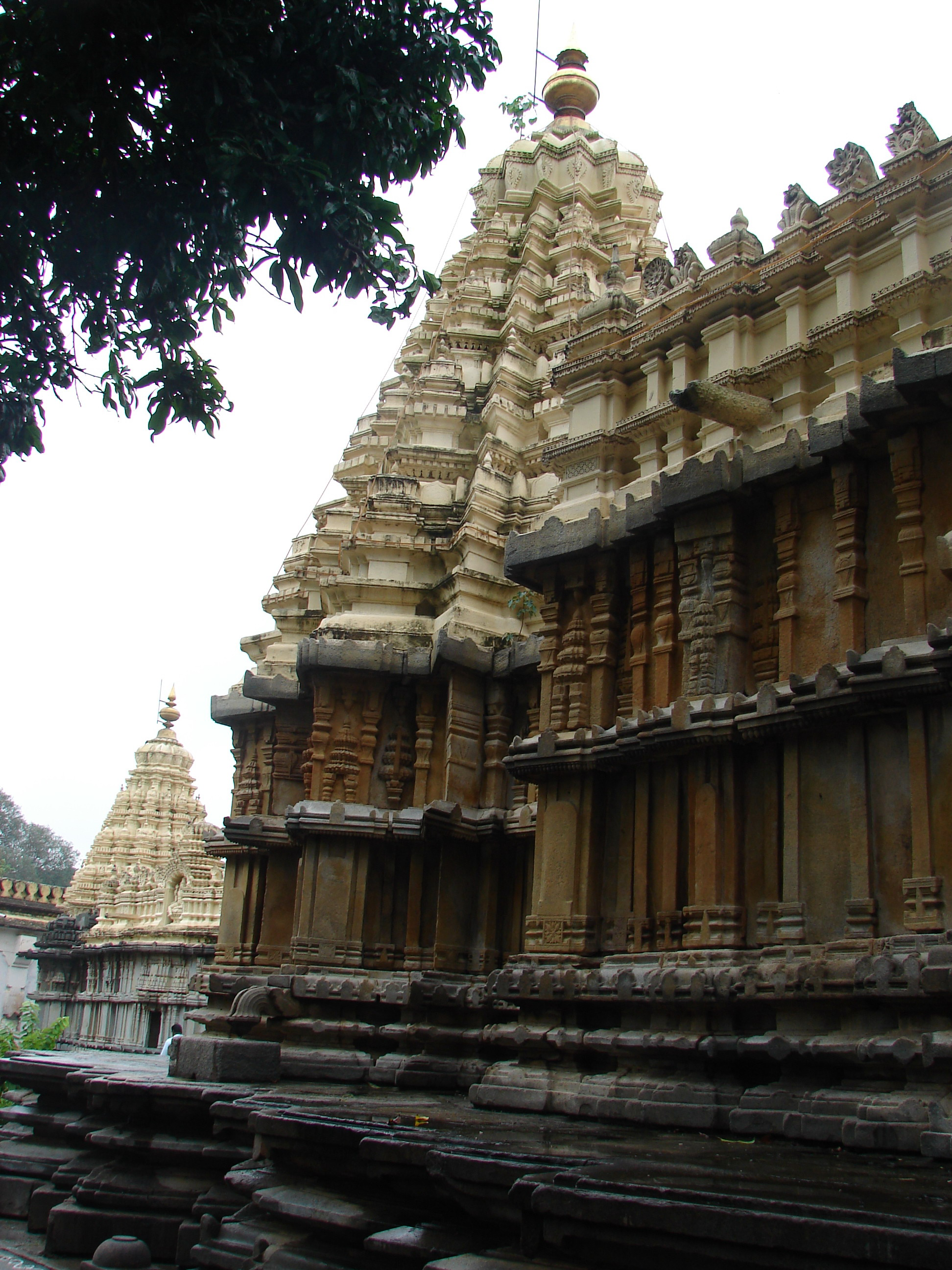
A view of the Shveta Varahaswamy (foreground) and Mahalakshmi (background) temples, Amba Vilas Palace, Mysore

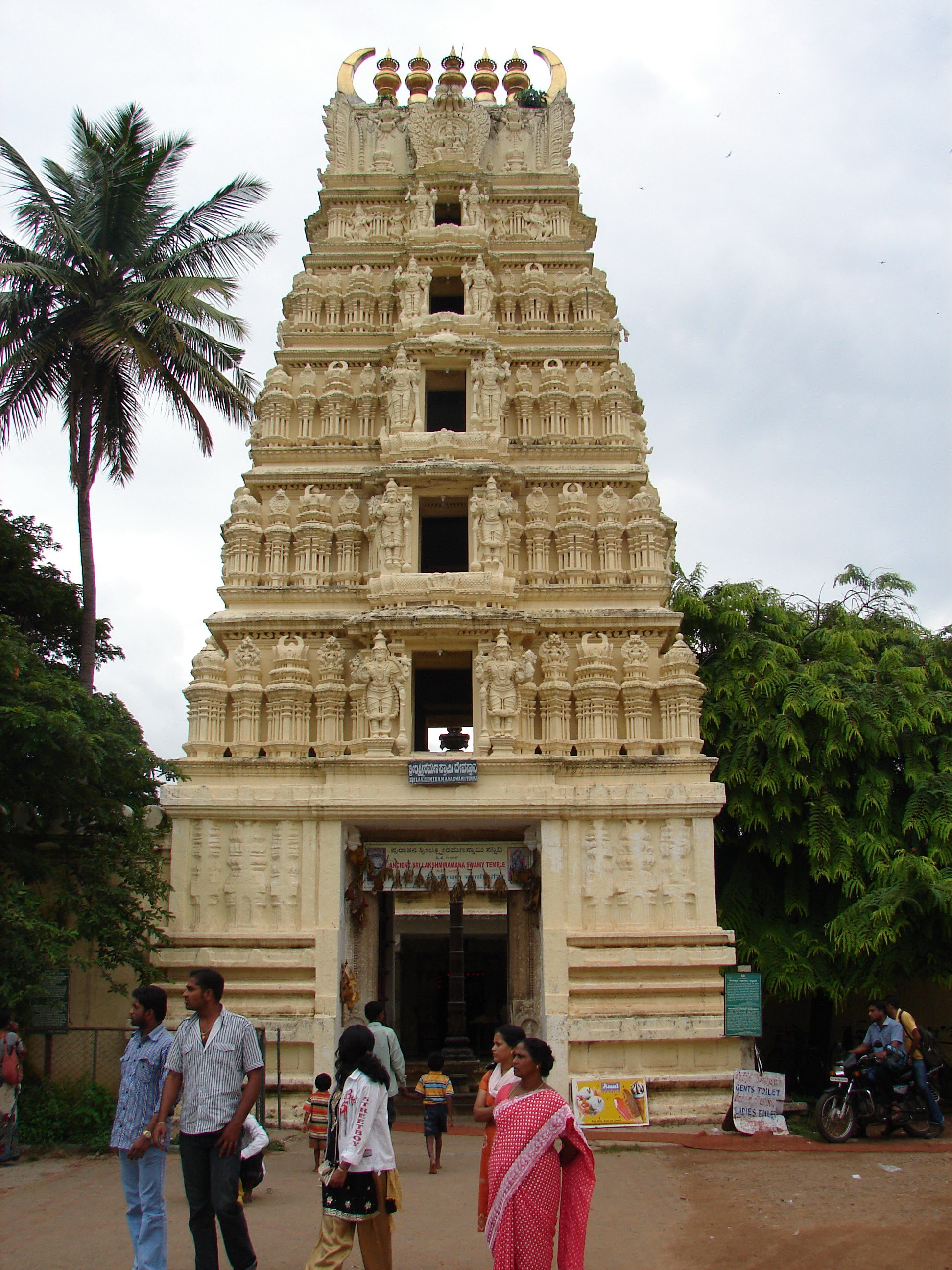
The Lakshmi Ramanaswamy temple, Amba Vilas Palace, Mysore

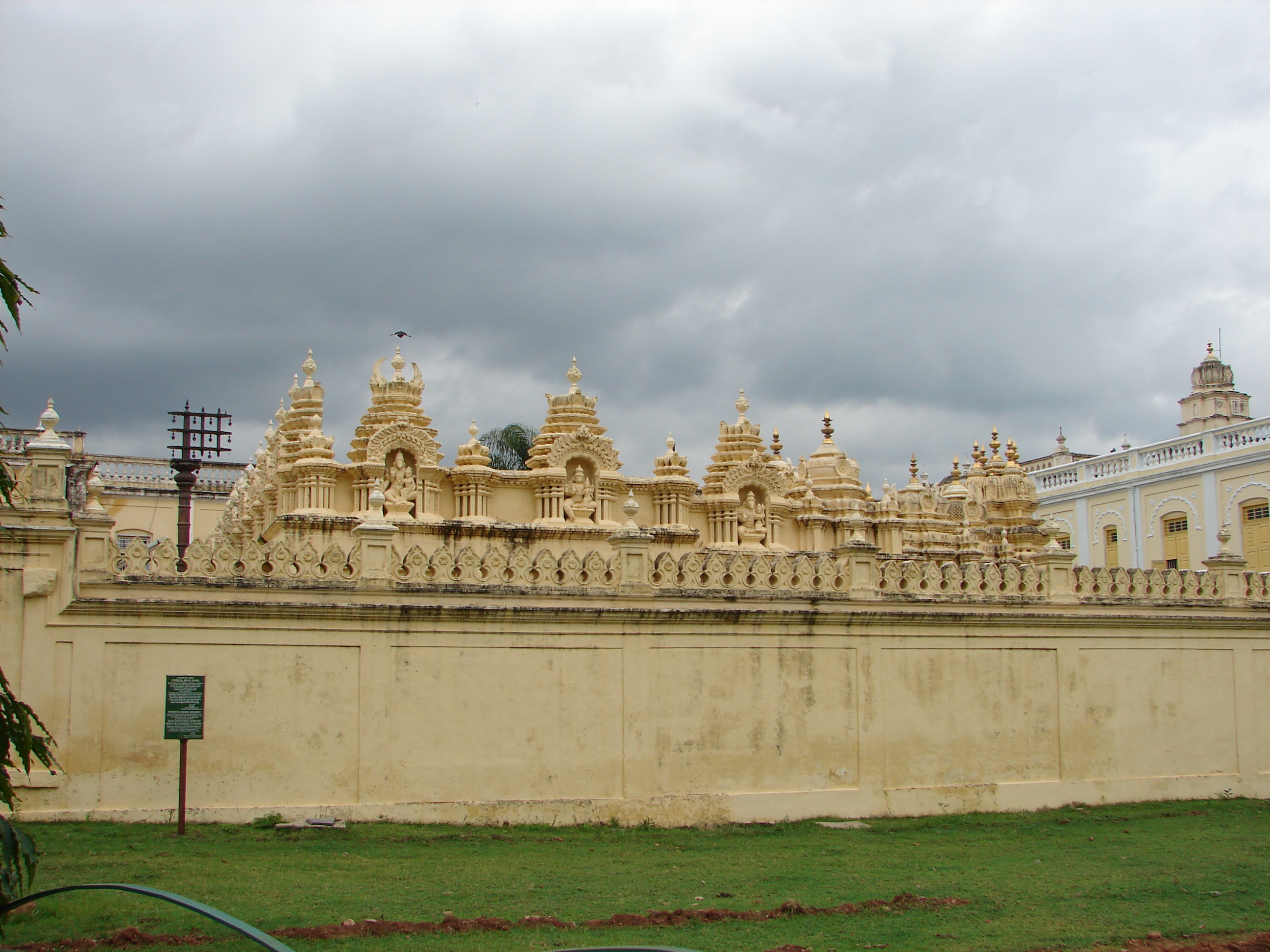
The Prasanna Krishnaswamy temple, Amba Vilas Palace, Mysore

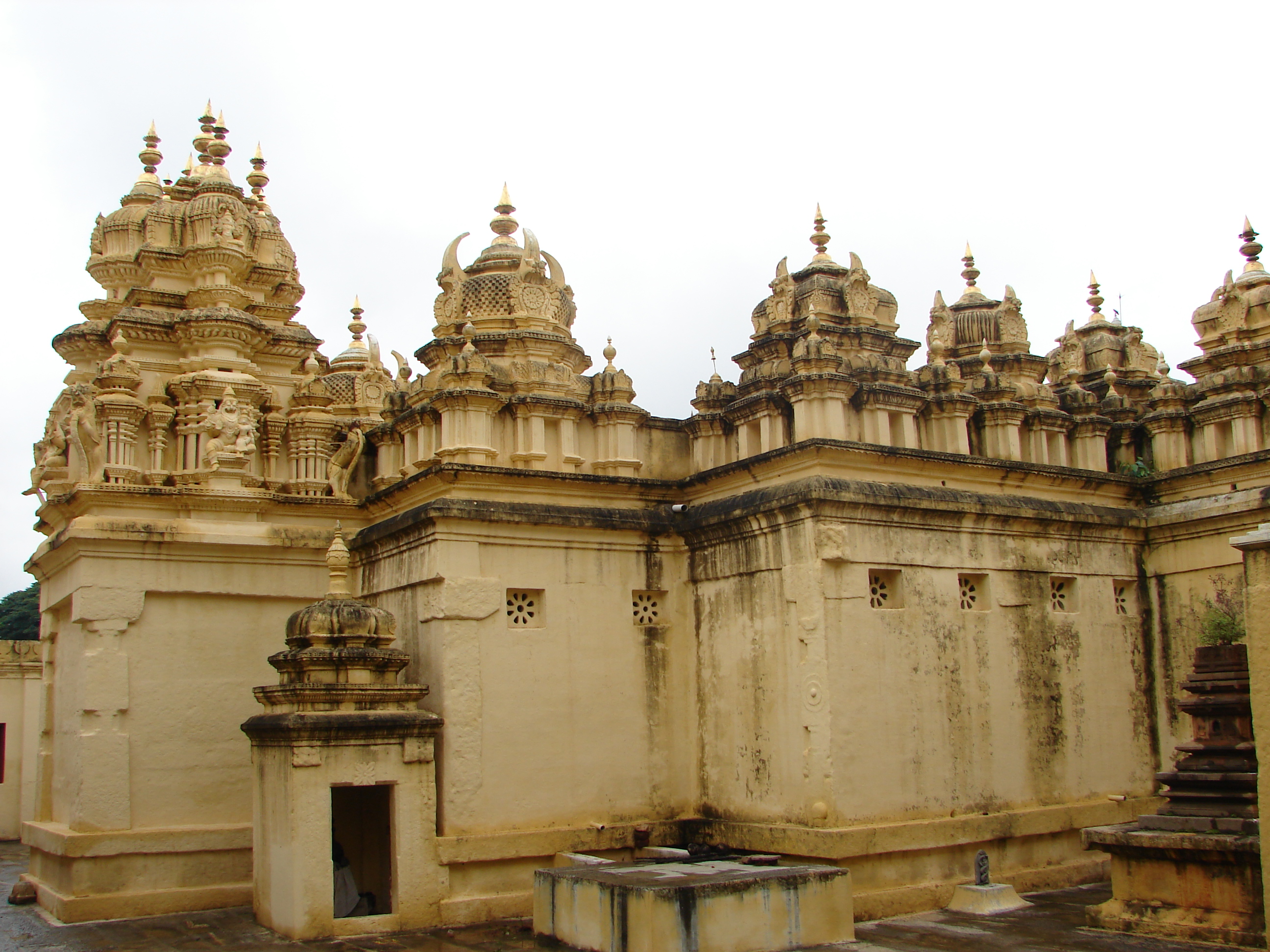
Shrines in the Prasanna Krishnaswamy temple, Amba Vilas Palace, Mysore

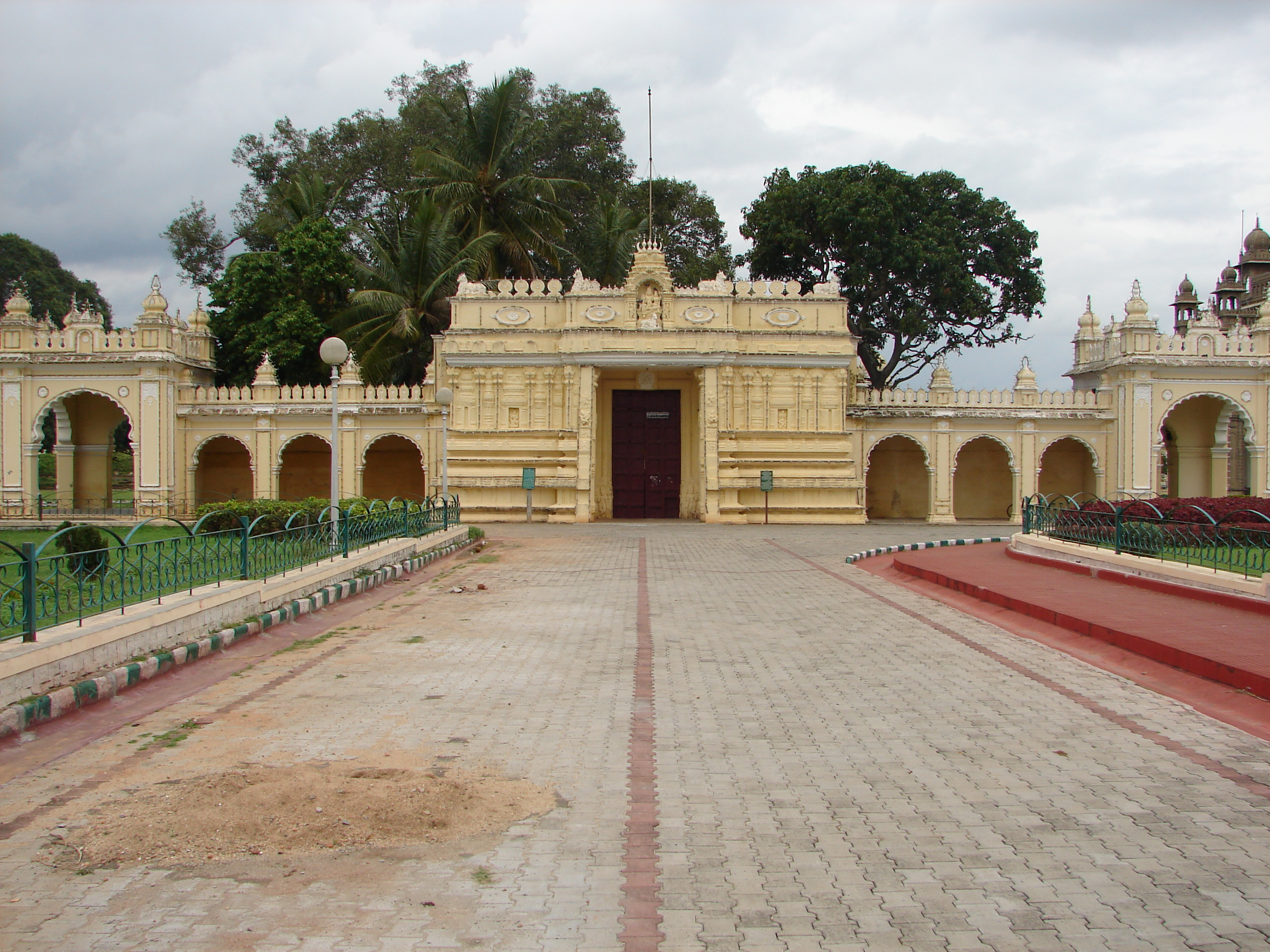
The Trinayaneshwara Swamy temple, Amba Vilas Palace, Mysore

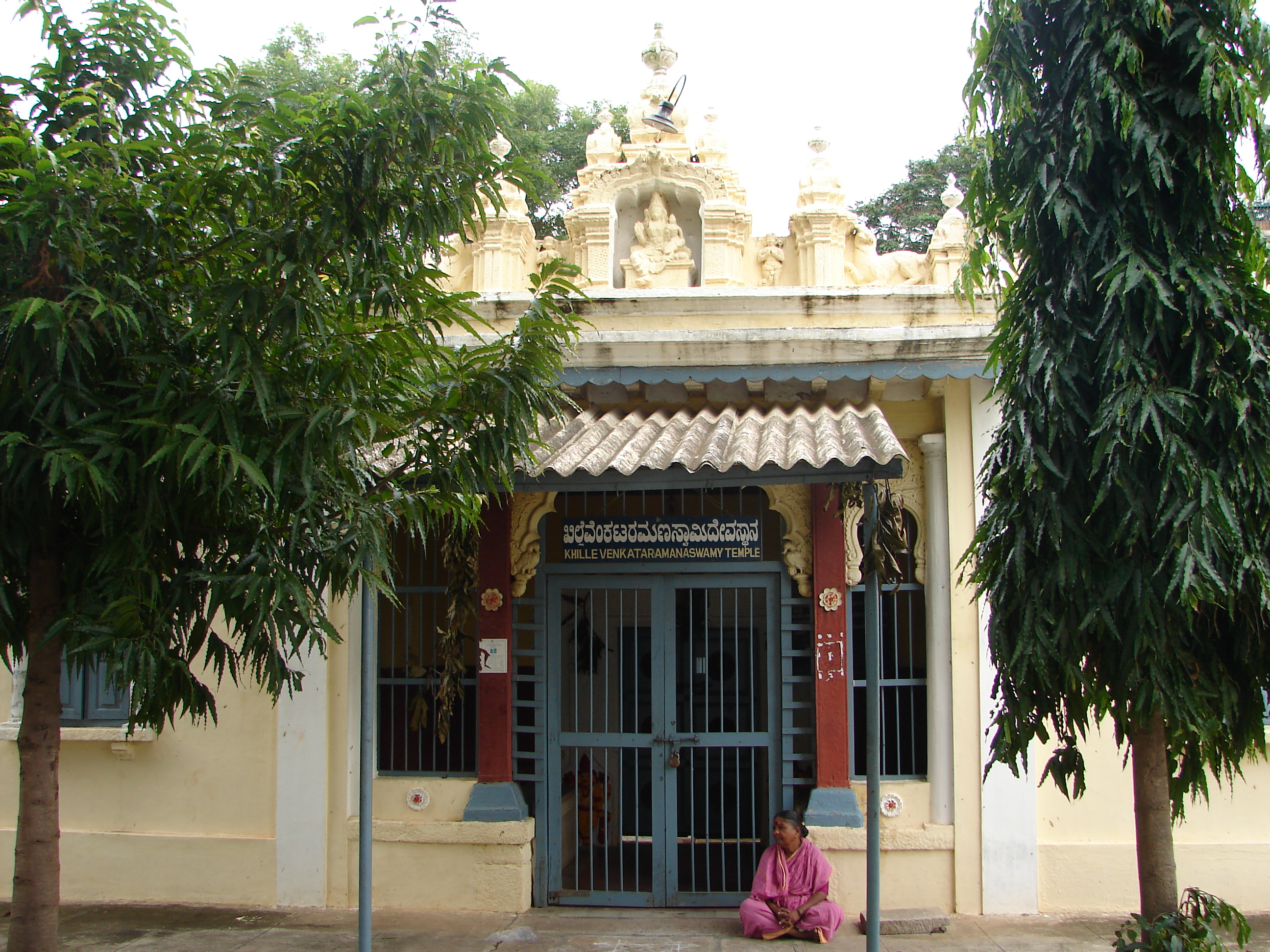
The Kille Venkataramana Swamy temple, Amba Vilas Palace, Mysore

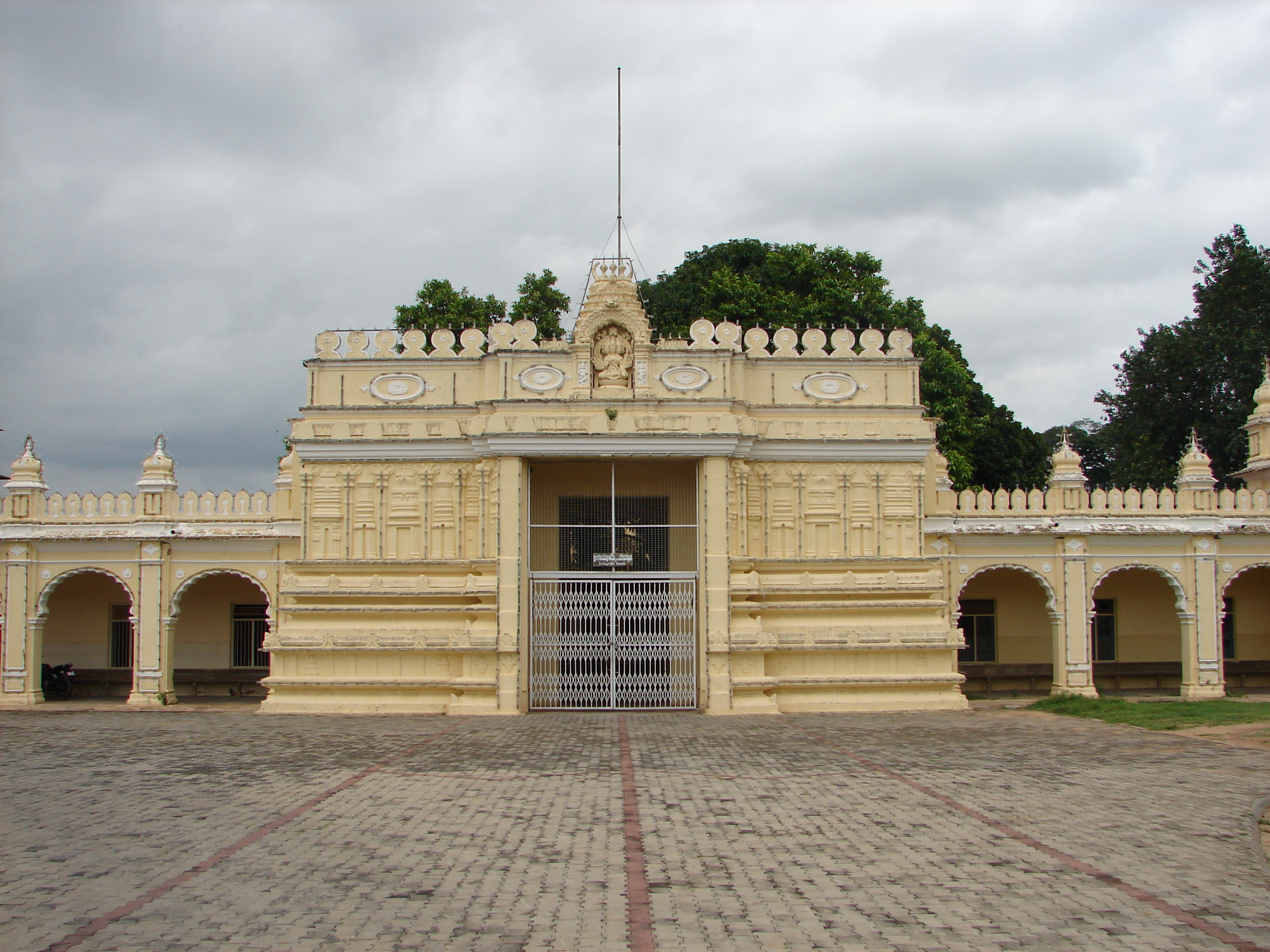
The Gayathri temple, Amba Vilas Palace, Mysore
