= Raja Wodeyar I =

Maharaja of Mysore from 1578 to 1617

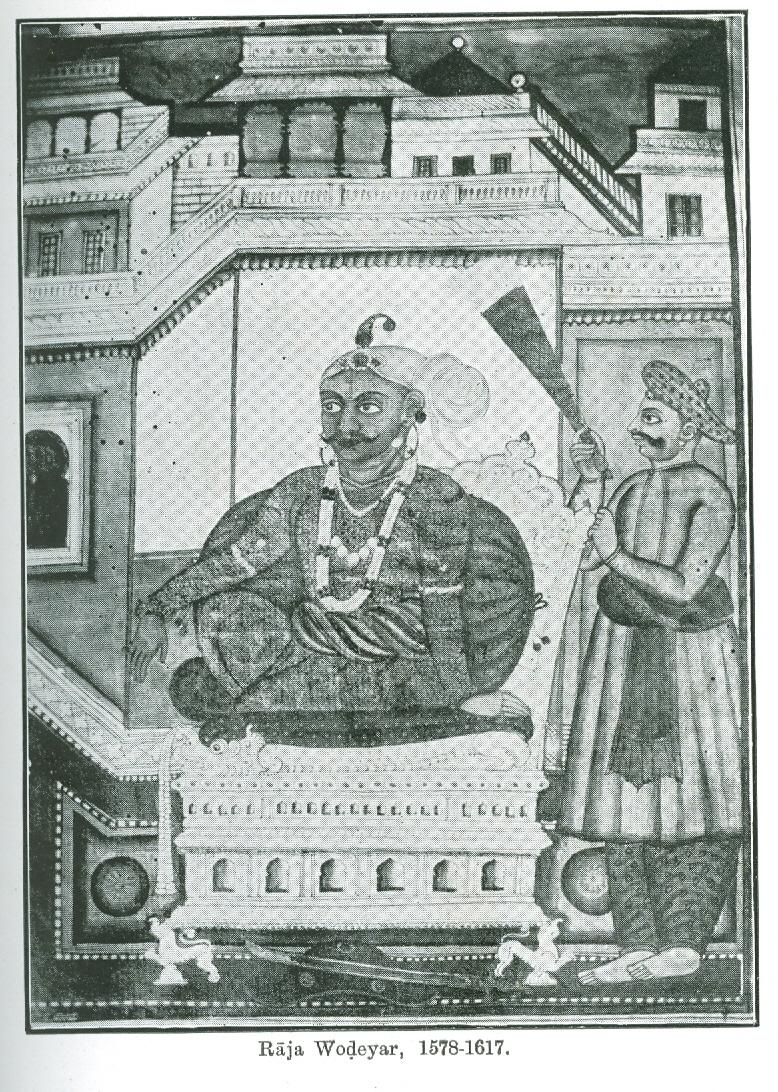
- Miniature of Raja Wodeyar

Maharaja of Mysore
- Reign: 26 November 1578 – 20 June 1617
- Predecessor: Chamaraja Wodeyar V
- Successor: Chamaraja Wodeyar VI
- Born: 2 June 1552
- Died: 20 June 1617 (aged 65); Cheluvanarayana Swamy Temple, Melukote, Kingdom of Mysore
- Issue: Yuvaraja Narasaraja; Raja Wodeyar II
Names
- Maha Mandalaswara Birud-antembara-ganda Raja Raja Wodeyar I
- House: Wodeyar
- Father: Chamaraja Wodeyar IV

Raja Wodeyar I (2 June 1552 – 20 June 1617) was the ninth Maharaja of the Kingdom of Mysore. He was the eldest son of Chamaraja Wodeyar IV, the seventh Maharaja of Mysore. After the death of his cousin, Chamaraja Wodeyar V, he ascended to the throne on 26 November 1578 and ruled until he died in 1617.

== Reign ==
=== Expelling Vijayanagara envoys ===
Raja Wodeyar I maintained his father's policy regarding Vijayanagara ambassadors who had been expelled much earlier, in order to seek independence from the Vijayanagara Empire. It was during the reign of Sriranga II, an Emperor of Vijayanagara, who faced internal conflict within his family, that most Vijayanagara emissaries had been expelled from the Kingdom of Mysore, retaining only one in Srirangapattana. Although Mysore declared independence from the Vijayanagara Empire and removed its representatives, it continued to recognize the empire and the emperor.

=== Mysore Dasara ===
The initiation of the Mysore Dasara celebrations in 1610 is attributed to Wodeyar I, marking the kingdom's independence from the Vijayanagara Empire. This involved offering prayers to the banni tree (Prosopis spicigera), located near the current Mysore Palace. Wodeyar I's only surviving son died a day before the commencement of Navaratri, but Wodeyar decreed that the ceremonies should continue uninterrupted.

Wodeyar was a follower of Vaishnavism and donated a bejeweled crown to the Lord Cheluvarayaswami Temple at Melukote. This crown is still used in the Raja Mudi carnival.

During the Indian Emergency of 1975, the crown was confiscated by the Government of Karnataka.

== Death ==
Legend states that Wodeyar I, upon entering the garbhagruha (sanctum sanctorum) of the Cheluvarayaswami Temple on 20 June 1617, became one with the deity (aikya; died) as a tradition. An idol (bhakthi vigraha) of Wodeyar I is located inside the temple, and another can be found in the Lakshminarayanaswami temple, part of the Temple inside the Mysore Palace Fort.

== See also ==
- Mysore Dasara
- Wodeyar dynasty
- Maharaja of Mysore
