= Raja Wodeyar II =

Maharaja of Mysore from 1637 to 1638

11th Maharaja of Mysore
- Reign: 2 May 1637 – 8 October 1638
- Predecessor: Chamaraja Wodeyar VI
- Successor: Kanthirava Narasaraja I
- Born: 26 May 1612
- Died: 8 October 1638 (aged 26)
Names
- Maha-Mandalaswara Birud-antembara-ganda Shri Raja Wodeyar II
- House: Wodeyar
- Father: Raja Wodeyar I

Raja Wodeyar II (26 May 1612 – 8 October 1638) was the eleventh Maharaja of the Kingdom of Mysore from 1637 to 1638. He was the fourth son of Maharaja Raja Wodeyar I.

== Reign ==
Raja Wodeyar II's reign was brief. When he ascended the throne after Chamaraja Wodeyar VI's death in 1637, he was only 25. However, he was poisoned on the orders of his dalvoys (commanders-in-chief) in 1638, just a year after coronation. He was succeeded by his cousin, Kanthirava Narasaraja I.

== See also ==
- Wodeyar dynasty
