= Chamaraja Wodeyar VI =

Maharaja of Mysore from 1617 to 1637

10th Maharaja of Mysore
- Reign: 20 June 1617 – 2 May 1637
- Predecessor: Raja Wodeyar I (grandfather)
- Successor: Raja Wodeyar II (paternal uncle)
- Born: 21 April 1603
- Died: 2 May 1637 (aged 34)
Names
- Maha Mandalaswara Birud-antembara-ganda Bettada Chamaraja Wodeyar VI
- House: Wodeyar
- Father: Yuvaraja Narasaraja

Chamaraja Wodeyar VI (21 April 1603 – 2 May 1637) was the tenth maharaja of the Kingdom of Mysore from 1617 after his grandfather Raja Wodeyar I's death that year until his death in 1637.

== Collapse of the Vijayanagara Empire ==
During the 20-year reign of Chamaraja Wodeyar VI, the Vijayanagara Empire collapsed drastically, major portions of which were annexed by the Bahamani and Deccan sultanates. During this period, Chamaraja Wodeyar's kingdom expanded quickly. By the end of his life, he had nearly doubled the kingdom's size. He died in summer on 2 May 1637. His paternal uncle, Raja Wodeyar II, took over after his death.

== See also ==
- Wodeyar dynasty
