= Kanthirava Narasaraja I =

Maharaja of Mysore from 1638 to 1659

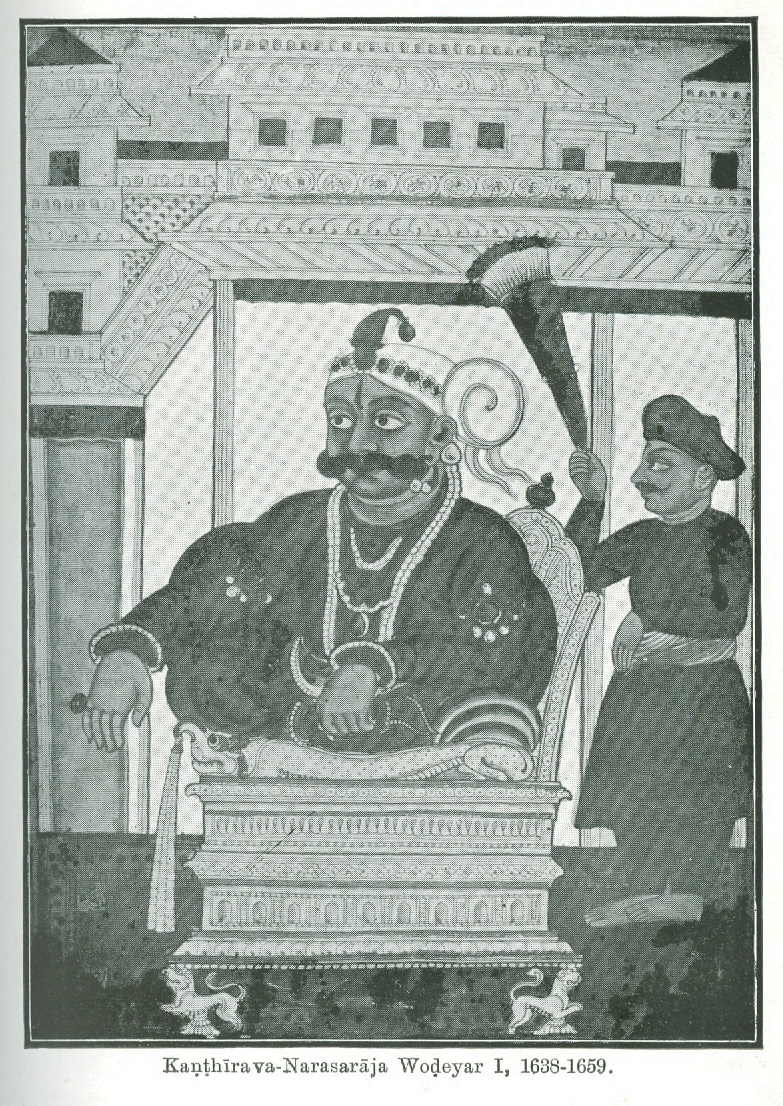
- Kanthirava Naurasaraja I, ruler of the principality of Mysore, 1638–1659.

Maharaja of Mysore
- Reign: 8 October 1638 – 31 July 1659
- Predecessor: Raja Wodeyar II
- Successor: Dodda Kempadevaraja
- Born: 2 May 1615
- Died: 31 July 1659 (aged 44)
Names
- Ranadhira Kanteerava Narasa Raja Wodeyar
- House: Wodeyar
- Father: Bettada Chamaraja
- Religion: Hindu

Kanthirava Narasaraja Wodeyar I (2 May 1615 – 31 July 1659) was the twelfth maharaja of the Kingdom of Mysore from 1638 until his death in 1659.

== Accession ==
The previous ruler, Raja Wodeyar II, Kanthirava Narasaraja Wodeyar's cousin, was poisoned on the orders of his dalvoy (commander-in-chief), Vikramaraya, within a year of becoming the maharaja. The 23-year-old Kanthirava Narasaraja I, who had earlier been adopted by the widow of Raja Wodeyar I, became, in 1638, the new maharaja of Mysore. Before becoming the king of Mysore, he lived in Terakanambi near Gundalpet, Chamarajanagar District.

== Reign ==
Soon after his accession, he was called on to defend Srirangapatna against the invasions of the Adil Shahis of Bijapur, a defence which he mounted with great loss for the enemy. In the fashion of the two wodeyars before him, he continued to expand the Mysore dominions. This included taking Satyamangalam from the Nayaks of Madurai in the south, unseating the Chingalvas from their base in Piriyapatna in the west, gaining possession of Hosur (near Salem) to the north, and delivering a major blow to the remnant rule of Kempe Gowda of Magadi's henchmen at Yelahanka, from whom a large tribute was exacted. Kanthirava Narasaraja I was also the first wodeyar of Mysore to create the symbols associated with royalty, such as the royal coats of arms, establishing mints, and issuing coins named Kanthiraya (corrupted to "Canteroy") after him. These were to remain part of Mysore's 'current national money' for well over a century.

== Dissolution of the Vijayanagara Empire ==
Although the Vijayanagara Empire had succumbed to rampages and forages of the Bahamani and Deccan Sultanates, Kanthirava Narasaraja Wodeyar, continued to recognise the Vijayanagara Empire and its namesake emperor Sriranga III. But by then, Sriranga III had completely lost power and control over the empire.

Kanthirava Narasaraja I had ten wives. He died on 31 July 1659, at the age of 44.

South India during the time of Kanthirava Narasaraja I.

== Early Christianity in Mysore ==
Catholic missionaries, which had arrived in the coastal areas of southern India—the Malabar coast, the Kanara coast, and the Coromandel coast—starting early in the sixteenth century, did not begin work in land-locked Mysore until halfway through the seventeenth century. The Mysore mission was established in Srirangapatna in 1649 by Leonardo Cinnami, an Italian Jesuit from Goa. Although a few years later Cinnami was expelled from Mysore on account of opposition in Kanthirava's court, towards the end of Kanthirava's rule, Cinnami returned to establish missions in half a dozen locations. During his second stay, Cinnami obtained permission to convert Kanthirava's subjects to Christianity; however, he was successful mostly in the eastern regions of Kanthirava's dominions, regions that later became part of the Madras Presidency of British India. (Subrahmanyam 1989, p. 209) notes, "...Of a reported 1700 converts in the Mysore mission in the mid-1660s, a mere quarter were Kannadigas (Kannada language speakers), the rest being Tamil speakers from the western districts of modern-day Tamil Nadu...".

== In popular culture ==
His life story was adapted into the 1960 Kannada movie Ranadheera Kanteerava.

== See also ==
- History of Mysore and Coorg, 1565–1760
