= Agrahara, Mysore =

Coordinates: 12°17′52.63″N 76°39′6.53″E

Agrahara is an area of the city of Mysore in the state of Karnataka in India. Famous locations in Agrahara include Mysore Palace as well as several gardens and historic temples. The area is bounded by Albert Victor Road to the North, MG Road to the South, Bengaluru-Nilgiri Road to the East, and Cheluvamba Agrahara Road to the West. The term agrahara or agraharam refers to a grant of land and agricultural income made by royalty to Brahmins in pre-independence South India. Though the Mysuru Agrahara is commonly referred to as a single neighbourhood, it is a composite of multiple adjacent smaller settlements built over time.

== History ==
Among the first of the settlements built were the Krishna Vilasa Agrahara and the Lakshmivilasa Agrahara, built in 1821. The former had 20 houses and was built opposite the latter. Inscriptions dating from 1821 found within the premises of Prasanna Nanjundeshwara Swamy Temple in Santhepete says that three of the houses were established by the queens of Mummadi Krishnaraja Wadiyar, Devajammanni, Lingajammmani and Cheluvujammani, respectively. They are now called the Lakshmi Vilasa Agrahara, Krishna Vilasa Agrahara and Rama Vilasa Agrahara. Seetha Vilasa Agrahara and Kathvadipura Agrahara were also built in the same time period, while Kashipathi Agrahara, Ramanuja Agrahara and Sreenivasan Agrahara were built later on. The Rajaram Agrahara and Sreenivasan Agrahara in particular were built relatively late in the history of the Kingdom of Mysore, with the former having been inaugurated in 1935 and the latter in 1938 as part of a municipal housing plan.

Royalty were not alone in building these agraharas, as prominent citizens also did. For example, the Subbarayadasara Agrahara was built in 1836 by a Madhva saint named Subbarayadasa with nine houses for the priests of the Prasanna Venkataramanaswamy Temple, which had been opened in 1825 in the erstwhile home of the saint. The agraharas were not only residential areas, but also contained elements of religious and political life, such as Hindu temples, mathas and royal residences. The royal stables stood in these areas until they were moved to the Mysore Zoo during the reign of Nalwadi Krishnaraja Wadiyar.

== Notable places ==
Agrahara Circle is named after N. Madhava Rao, a Diwan of Mysore from 1941 to 1945 when Maharaja Jayachamaraja Wadiyar was the ruler. He was a member of the Drafting Committee of the Indian Constitution. A Choultry was constructed by Diwan Purnaiah at Agrahara to provide accommodation for students of Maharaja's Sanskrit College. However, it was destroyed during the expansion of Vani Vilasa Road and renamed as Mahatma Gandhi Road.

Agrahara often refers to the neighboring areas of Agrahara Circle, located between Nanju Malige and Mysore Palace. Ramachandra Agrahara, Kashipathi Agrahara, Ramanuja Agrahara, and Srinivasan Agrahara are the Agraharas located near the Circle. Vanivilas Market is located next to the Circle. Temples located in Agrahara include 101 Ganapathi Temple, Maha Ganapathi Temple and Sree Rajarajeshwari Temple. The neighbourhood also includes the Padma Theatre.

== See also ==
- Krishnaraja Boulevard
- Chamarajapuram railway station
- Kuvempunagar
- Ballal Circle
- Chamarajapuram, Mysore
