= Agrahara Circle =

Coordinates: 12.29795142822711°N 76.65181431219148°E

Agrahara Circle, officially known as N. Madhava Rao Circle, is a street circle and a suburb in the southern Indian city of Mysore in Karnataka.

== History ==
An Inscription dating back to 1821 located within the premises of Prasanna Nanjundeshwara Swamy Temple at Santhe Pete says that the Agraharas were first established by Maharani Devajammanni, the queen of Maharaja Krishnaraja Wadiyar I and adoptive mother of Maharaja Krishnaraja Wadiyar II, by constructing 21 houses to the west of Mysore Fort, on the right side of the royal stables.

== Etymology ==
Agrahara Circle is named after the Sir N. Madhava Rao, the dewan of Mysore and prime minister to Maharaja Jayachamaraja Wadiyar. He managed food shortage crisis in the Kingdom faced during the Second World War. During his tenure, the Legislative Council and the Mysore Representative Assembly were combined to form the new Mysore Legislative Council. The first election to the new Council was conducted in February 1941. His son, N. Lakshman Rao, was the Chief Commissioner of Mysore Municipality Corporation, and saw to the further development of Mysore city.

== Location ==
Agrahara Circle is located between Nanju Malige and the Palace. Vanivilas Market is located next to Agrahara Circle.

== See also ==
- Agrahara, Mysore
- Krishnaraja Boulevard
- Chamarajapuram railway station
- Kuvempunagar
- Ballal Circle
- Chamarajapuram, Mysore
