= K. G. Koppal =

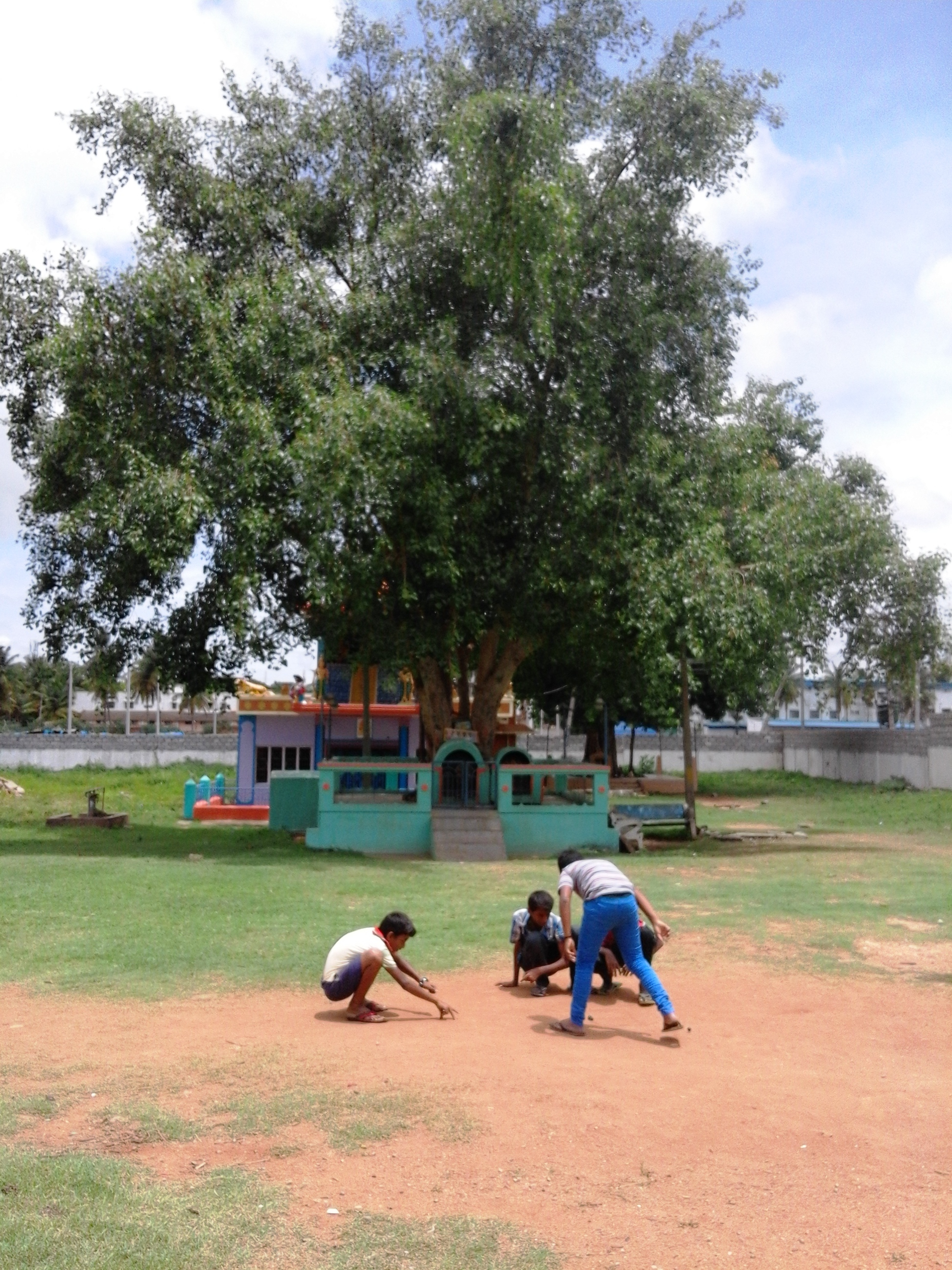
- Interactive map of K. G. Koppal
- Coordinates: 12.30034°N 76.64080°E
- Country: India
- State: Karnataka
- District: Mysore
- Time zone: UTC+5:30 (IST)
- PIN: 570005

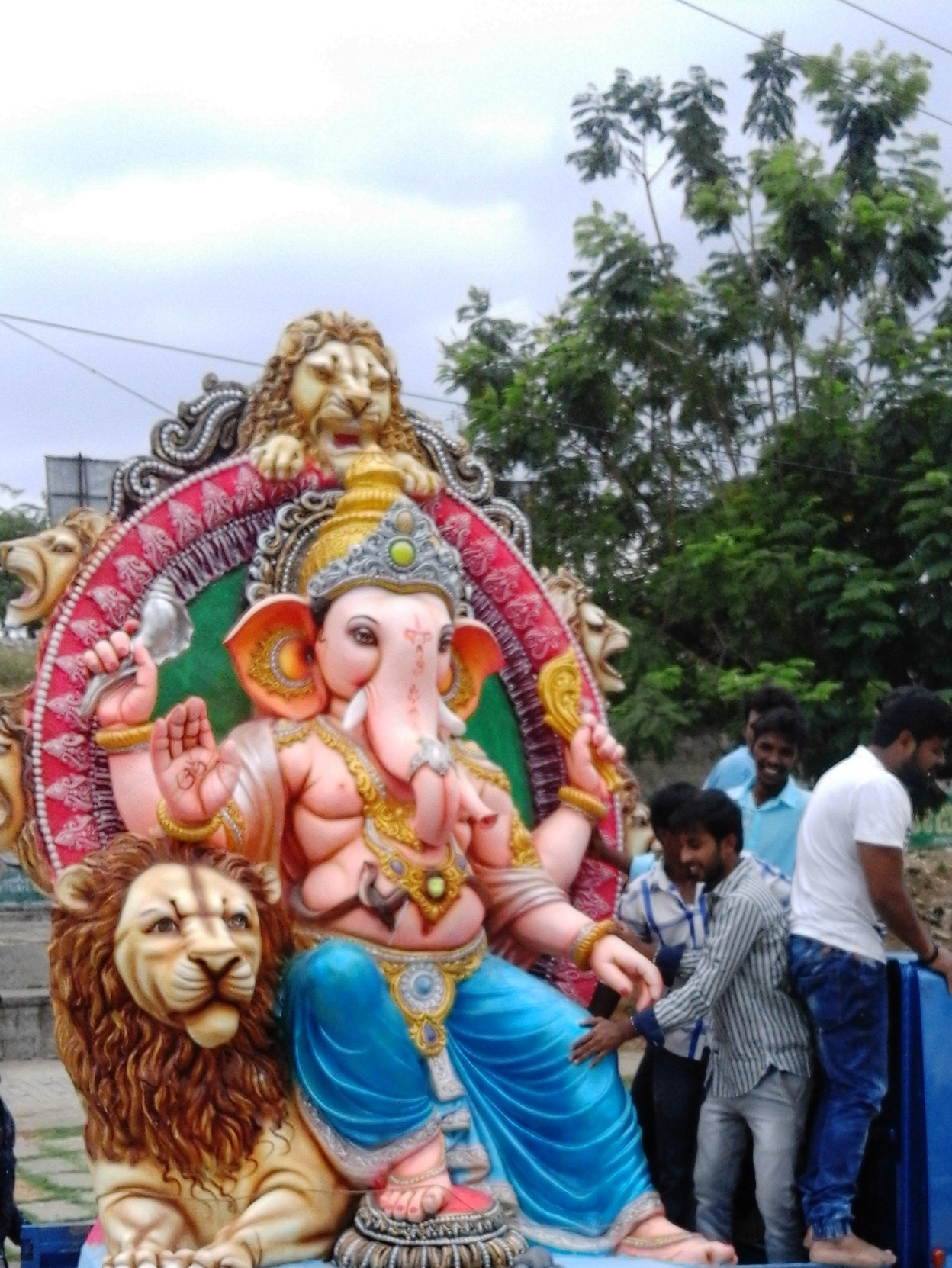
Ganesha festival in K.G.Koppal

Chandramouleswara Temple

Kannegowdanna Koppal, popularly known as K. G. Koppal, is a locality in Chamarajapuram, Mysore, Karnataka. The locality is named after Kannegowda, a noted kushti wrestler at Mysore Palace.

== Important Landmarks ==
- Ashokapuram Police Station
- Appollo Hospital
- K. G. Koppal Market
- Akshaya Bhandar
- Underbridge junction
- Chamarajapuram railway station
- Old district court complex
- New district court complex

== Image Gallery ==
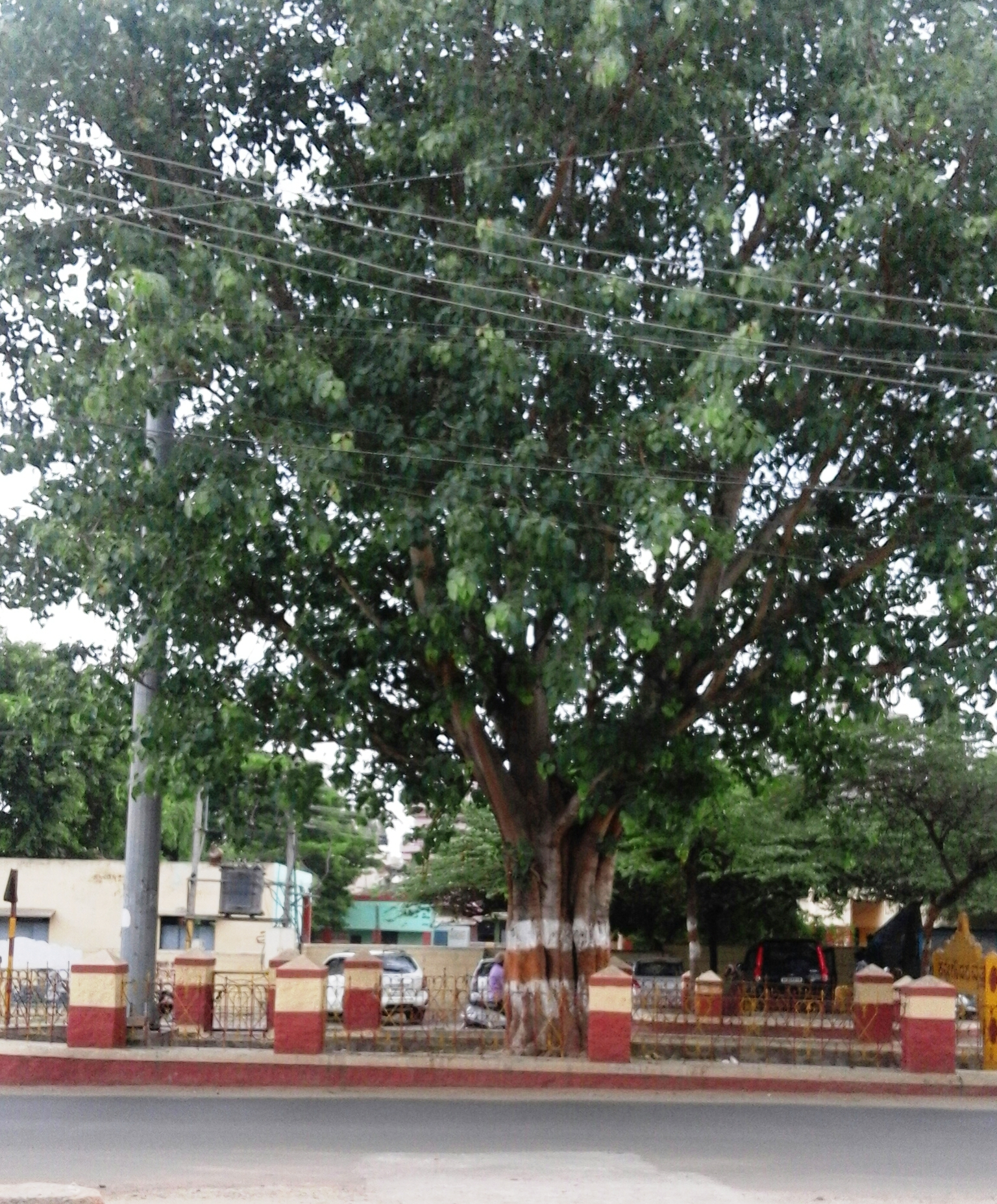
Underbridge at K. G. Koppal

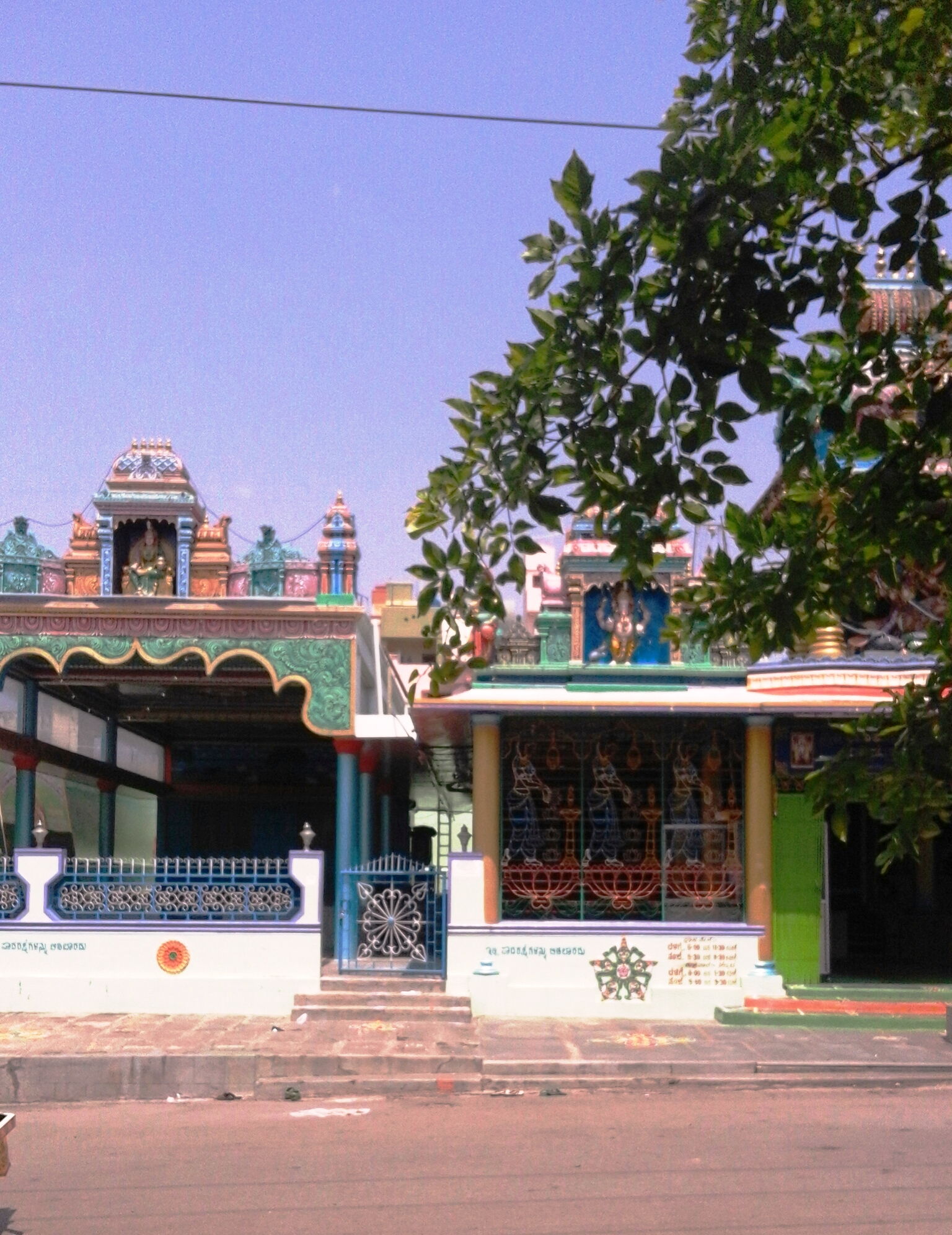
K. G. Koppal temple

== See also ==
- Chamarajapuram, Mysore
- Kuvempu Nagar
- Mysore South
- Jayanagar, Mysore
- Ashokapuram, Mysore
