= Arcot Ramasamy Mudaliar =

Diwan of Mysore

Sir Arcot Ramasamy Mudaliar KCSI
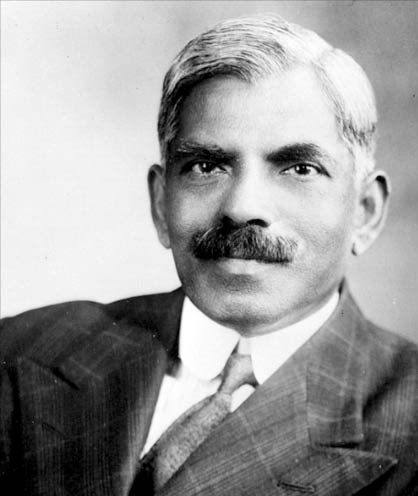
- Arcot Ramasamy Mudaliar in 1934

24th Diwan of Mysore
- In office August 1946 – November 1949
- Monarch: Jayachamaraja Wodeyar Bahadur
- Preceded by: N. Madhava Rao
- Succeeded by: Position abolished

1st President of the United Nations Economic and Social Council (ECOSOC)
- In office 23 January 1946 – 23 January 1947
- Preceded by: None
- Succeeded by: Jan Papanek

Member of the Imperial War Cabinet
- In office 1942–1945
- Monarch: George VI
- Prime Minister: Winston Churchill
- Succeeded by: War Cabinet disbanded

Member of the Viceroy's Executive Council
- In office 1939–1942
- Monarch: George VI of the United Kingdom
- Governor General: Victor Hope, 2nd Marquess of Linlithgow

Personal details
- Born: 14 October 1887 Kurnool, Deccan Zone, Madras Presidency, British India (now in Kurnool district, Andhra Pradesh, India)
- Died: 17 July 1976 (aged 88) Madras (now Chennai), Tamil Nadu, India
- Party: Justice Party
- Education: Madras Christian College
- Occupation: Diplomat
- Profession: Lawyer

Dewan Bahadur Sir Arcot Ramasamy Mudaliar, KCSI (14 October 1887 – 17 July 1976) was an Indian lawyer, diplomat, and statesman who was the first president of the United Nations Economic and Social Council and the 24th and last dewan of Mysore. He also served as a senior leader of the Justice Party and in various administrative and bureaucratic posts in pre- and Independent India. He was a prominent orator and was known for his inspiring speeches.

== Early life ==
Arcot Ramasamy Mudaliar was born in the town of Kurnool in then-Madras Presidency, British India, in a Tamil-speaking Thuluva Vellalar (Arcot Mudaliar) family. He was the elder of a pair of twins, the other being Arcot Lakshmanaswamy Mudaliar. He had his schooling at Municipal High School, Kurnool.

He graduated from Madras Christian College and studied law at Madras Law College. On completion of his studies, he practised as a lawyer before joining the Justice Party and entering politics. Mudaliar was nominated to the Madras Legislative Council in 1920 and served from 1920 to 1926 and as a member of the Madras Legislative Assembly from 1931 to 1934, losing to S. Satyamurti in the 1934 elections. He served as a member of the Imperial Legislative Council from 1939 to 1941, as a part of Winston Churchill's war cabinet from 1942 to 1945, and as the Indian representative in the Pacific War Council. He was India's delegate to the San Francisco Conference and served as the first president of the United Nations Economic and Social Council. He also served as the last Diwan of Mysore from 1946 to 1949.

He was an uncle to Cmdr. V.S.P. Mudaliar, a veteran of World War II.

== Political career ==
=== Justice Party ===
Mudaliar was a part of the Justice Party ever since its inception in 1917 and served as its general secretary. In July 1918, he went to England along with T. M. Nair and Kurma Venkata Reddy Naidu as part of the Justice Party delegation to argue in favour of communal representation and offer evidence before the Reforms Committee. The evidence was taken just before Nair's death on 17 July 1919.

=== All India Non-Brahmin Movement ===
Mudaliar rose in stature gradually and began to be regarded as the "brain of the Justice Party". He assisted in coordinating between non-Brahmins in different parts of India and organising non-Brahmin conferences.

Mudaliar maintained friendly relations with Shahu Maharaj and non-Brahmin leaders from Maharashtra and parts of North India and helped coordinate between and uniting leaders from different parts of India and in organising non-Brahmin conferences. He was a participant in the Satara Non-Brahmin Conference held on 18 December 1922, presided over by Raja Rajaram III. He also participated in the All-India Non-Brahmin Conference held at Belgaum on 26 December 1924 where his oratory was appreciated. At the Seventh Non-Brahmin Conference held on 8 February 1925, he appealed for unity amongst non-Brahmins.

Following the death of Sir P.T. Theagaroya Chetty in 1925, Mudaliar functioned as the sole link between Shahu Maharaj's Satya Shodhak Samaj and the Justice Party. He assisted Raja P. Ramarayaningar in organising an All-India Non-Brahmin Confederation at Victoria Hall, Madras, on 19 December 1925. He supported the candidature of B.V. Jadhav who was eventually appointed president. On 26 December 1925, he organised a second conference at Amaravati. The conference comprised two sessions: Rajaram II presided over the first while P. Ramarayaningar presided over the second. In the second session of the Conference, Mudaliar said:

It was too late in the day for me to defend what was the Non-Brahmin movement. When its activities had spread from Bombay to Madras, from the Vindhya mountains to Cape Comorin, its very extent and the lightning rapidity with which its principles have pervaded the country will be the best justification of the Movement

Mudaliar's utterances at this conference became the target of The Hindu, which criticised him by saying that "the speaker was desiring to produce an effect in another province, forced him to draw rather freely on his imagination".

In the elections to the Madras Legislative Council held on 8 November 1926, the Justice Party lost the elections, winning just 21 of the 98 seats in the council. Mudaliar was one of the many who met with failure in the elections. He took a temporary retirement from politics and replaced P. N. Raman Pillai as the editor of Justice, the mouthpiece of the Justice Party. Under Mudaliar, there was a tremendous growth in its circulation, and Justice became widely popular. On 1 March 1929, he appeared before the Simon Commission along with Sir A. T. Paneerselvam, another important leader of the Justice Party, to provide evidence on behalf of the Justice Party.

== Administrative career ==
=== Mayor of Madras ===
Mudaliar served as the mayor of Madras from 1928 to 1930.

In 1935, he resigned as the chief editor of Justice following his appointment to the Tariff Board. On 25 February 1937, he was knighted in the 1937 New Year Honours List, by which time he was a member of the Council of the Secretary of State for India.

=== Member of Churchill's war cabinet ===
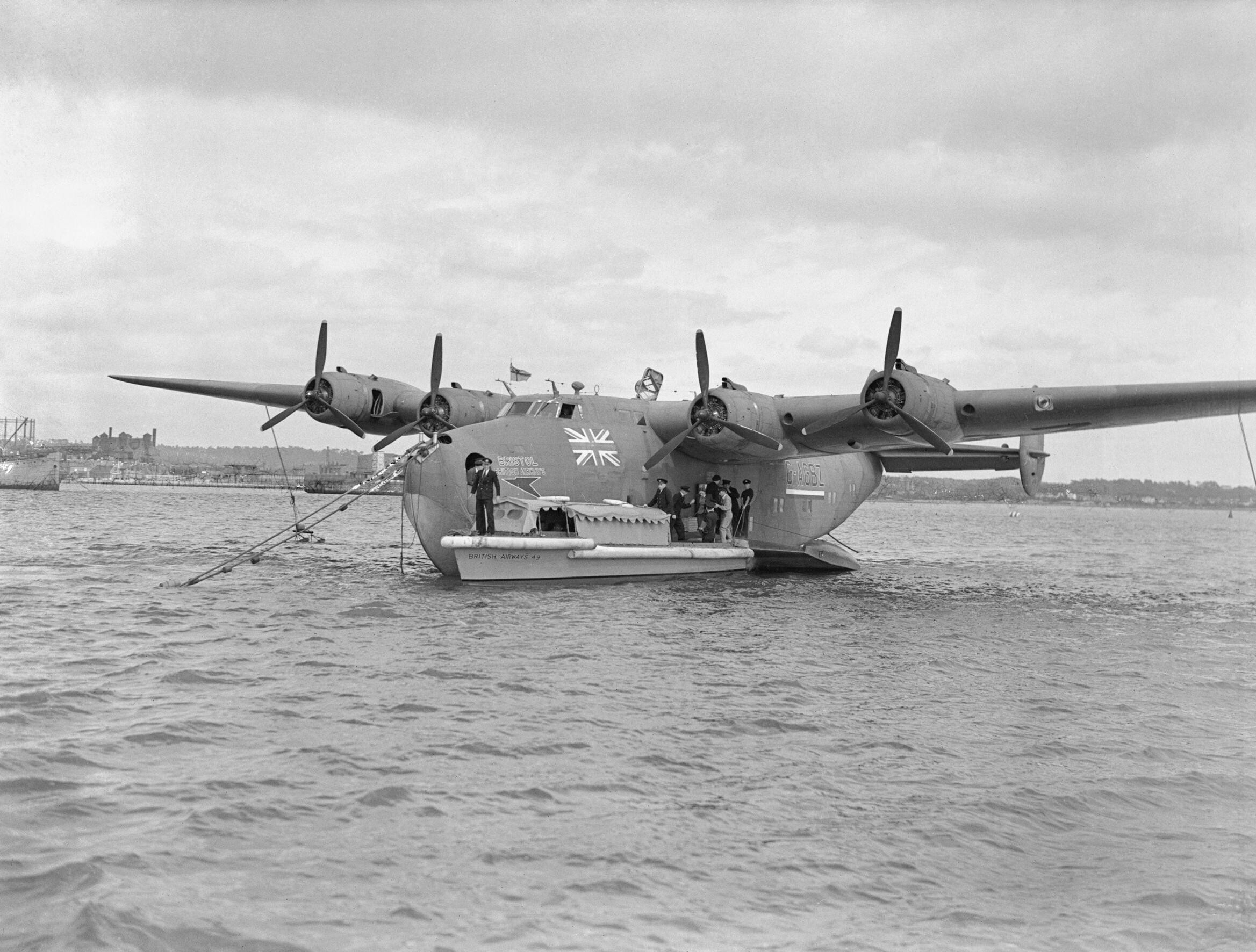
Poole, Dorset, Digvijaysinhji Ranjitsinhji, the Maharajah Jam Sahib of Nawanagar and Sir A. Ramaswamy Mudaliar arrived from India for talks with the War Cabinet (between 1940 and 1945).

Shortly before the Second World War broke out in 1939, Mudaliar was appointed a member of the Viceroy's Executive Council. In June 1942, he was knighted again with KCSI. In July 1942, he was appointed to Winston Churchill's war cabinet, one of the two Indians nominated to the post.

=== President of the UN Economic and Social Council ===
Mudaliar served as India's delegate to the United Nations at the San Francisco Conference between 25 April and 26 June 1945, where he chaired the committee that discussed economic and social problems. He was elected as the first president of the Economic and Social Council during its session at Church House, London, on 23 January 1946. Under his presidency, the council passed a resolution in February 1946 calling for an international health conference.

At the conference which was eventually held on 19 June 1946, inaugurated by Mudaliar, the World Health Organization came into being, and the constitution for the new organisation was read out and approved by delegates from 61 nations. On the expiry of his one-year term, he returned to India and became Diwan of Mysore.

=== Diwan of Mysore ===
Mudaliar was appointed as the Dewan of Mysore in 1946 by Maharaja Jayachamaraja Wadiyar, succeeding Sir N. Madhava Rao. He presided over a very turbulent period in Mysore's and India's history.

During his tenure as Diwan of Mysore, Mudaliar organised a number of Tamil music concerts in the kingdom in order to raise money for the restoration of the Carnatic musician Tyagaraja's tomb at Tiruvaiyaru.

== Executive career ==
On 5 January 1955, the Industrial Credit and Investment Corporation of India (ICICI) was established. Mudaliar was elected as its first chairman.

Mudaliar helped Murugappa Group setup Tube Investments of India Limited. In his later years, he served as its chairman until his death in 1976.

Murugappa Group, run by members of his family, also runs A.R.L.M. Matriculation Higher Secondary School in Cuddalore in his memory. His descendants are based out of United States, Canada, and Australia.

== Honours ==
Oxford University conferred him the Doctor of Civil Law, appreciating his contributions during the Second World War. He was also awarded Knight Commander of the Order of the Star of India and Knight Bachelor.

Mudaliar was awarded the Padma Bhushan in 1954 and the Padma Vibhushan in 1970.

== Religious beliefs ==
Despite his violent tirades against the Varnashrama dharma and Hindu scriptures in his writings and editorials in the Justice, Mudaliar was known to be a staunch Vaishnavite. He regularly sported the Vaishnavite namam. Once, while offered beef during a visit to England, he refused it with horror.

== Works ==
- Searchlight on Council debates: speeches in the Madras Legislative Council. Orient Longman. 1960.
- Arcot Ramasamy Mudaliar (1987). Mirror of the year: a collection of Sir A. Ramaswami Mudaliar's editorials in Justice, 1927. Dravidar Kazhagam.
