= N. Madhava Rao =

Diwan of Mysore (1887–1972)

Rajamantrapravina Pradhana Shiromani Sir Nyapathi Madhava Rao CIE
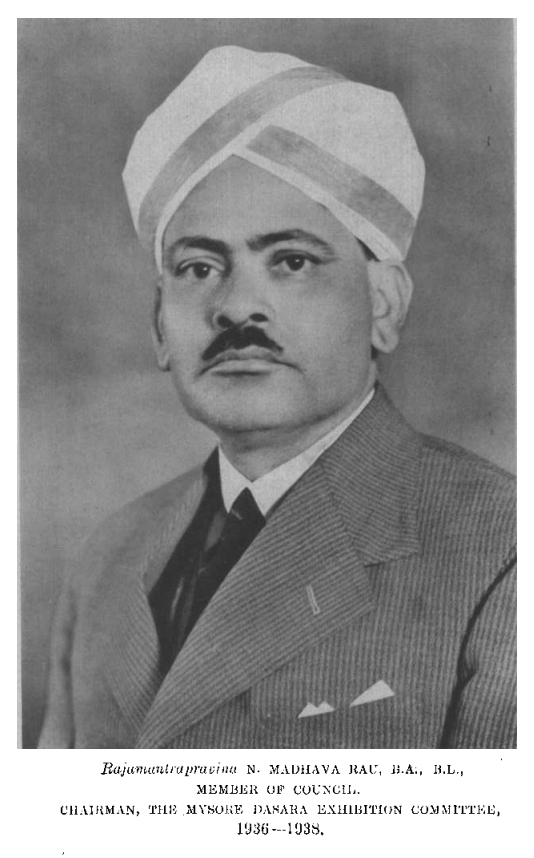

23rd Diwan of the Mysore Kingdom
- In office June 1941 – August 1946
- Preceded by: Sir Mirza Ismail
- Succeeded by: Sir Arcot Ramasamy Mudaliar

Personal details
- Born: 8 June 1887 Masulipatnam, Madras Presidency, British India
- Died: 28 August 1972 (aged 85) Bangalore, Mysore State, India
- Education: Pachaiyappa's College, Chennai
- Profession: Civil servant

Sir Nyapathi Madhava Rau (8 June 1887 – 28 August 1972) was an Indian civil servant, administrator, and statesman who served as the 23rd dewan of Mysore from 1941 to 1945 and later as a member of the Drafting Committee of the Constituent Assembly which drafted the Indian Constitution.

== Mysore civil service ==
Madhava Rao took the Mysore Civil Service examinations and graduated first rank, winning the Carmichael Medal. He joined the Mysore Civil Service as an Assistant Commissioner in the Gubbi town of Tumkur district. Later, he was appointed as a member of a commission to investigate a revolt in the Kollegal town of the then Coimbatore district. He served as Secretary of the Bhadravathi Steel Works from 1921 to 1924. He was the Trade Commissioner for Mysore in London, England, following this and was subsequently appointed Chief Secretary to the Government of Mysore. He then went on to become a member of the Mysore Constituent Council until his appointment as the Diwan of Mysore.

== Diwan of Mysore ==
Madhava Rao succeeded Sir Mirza Ismail on his retirement as the diwan, a post he held between 1941 and 1946. During his premiership, the Kingdom of Mysore was gripped by severe food shortages during the Second World War. Madhava Rau is credited with having managed the situation quite well and organised a successful recovery. He also successfully dealt with the damage caused to the Sivasamudram Electric Power Station by a lightning strike in 1944.

During his tenure as Diwan, the Mysore Legislative Council and the Mysore Representative Assembly were combined to form a new legislative council. The first elections to the newly reorganised council were held in February 1941.

== Later life ==
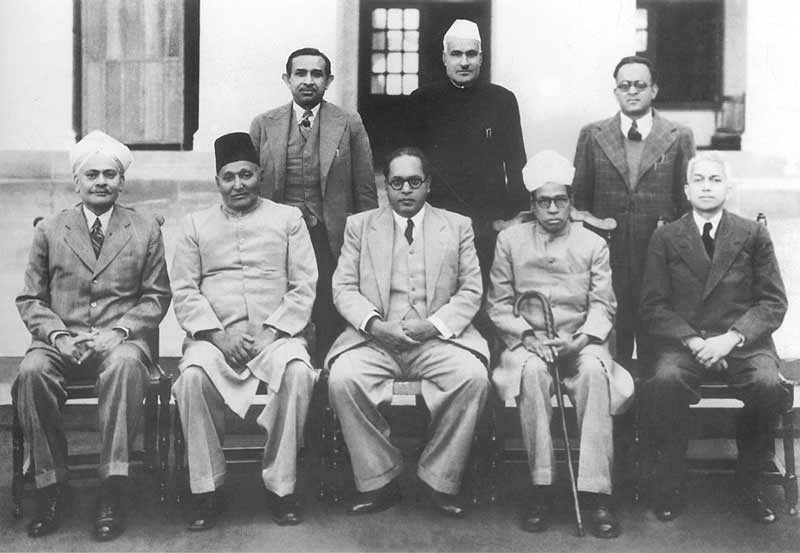
The Constitution drafting committee, 1947. Rao seated first from left.

After his retirement, Madhava Rau was a member of the Drafting Committee of the Indian Constitution headed by B.R. Ambedkar and of the first Constituent Assembly of India.

Madhava Rau died on 28 August 1972 at the age of 85.

== Opposition to Hindi ==
Madhava Rao was strongly opposed to the Hindi language becoming the lingua franca for India and favoured the continuation of English as the official language of the Indian Union.

== Family ==
Madhava Rau married Narasamma at the age of seventeen. The couple had three daughters and three sons. His sons were N. Lakshman Rau, Nyapathi. Narasimha Rau and N. Nagaraja Rau. His daughters were Rukmini, Sarojini and Sethu. N. Lakshman Rau served in the Indian Administrative Service and was the mayor of Bangalore. N. Narasimha Rau also served in the Indian Administrative Service and was the Chief Secretary of Karnataka. N. Nagaraja Rau served in the Indian Army and retired as a brigadier.

== Honours ==
Madhava Rau was made a Companion of the Order of the Indian Empire in 1943, a title that he relinquished in 1947. He was also awarded the titles of Rajamantra Pravina and Pradhana Shiromani by Maharaja Jayachamaraja Wadiyar.

=== Places in Honour ===
- N. Madhava Rao Circle, popularly known as Agrahara Circle in Mysore city

== Bibliography ==
- World biography, Part 2. Institute for Research in Biography. 1948. p. 160.
- "Hirienniah and Madhava Rao".
- "Ambedkar: The architect of Indian constitution Rao".
