= Maharaja's Sanskrit College, Mysore =

Educational organization in Karnataka, India

Coordinates: 12.30239°N 76.65170°E

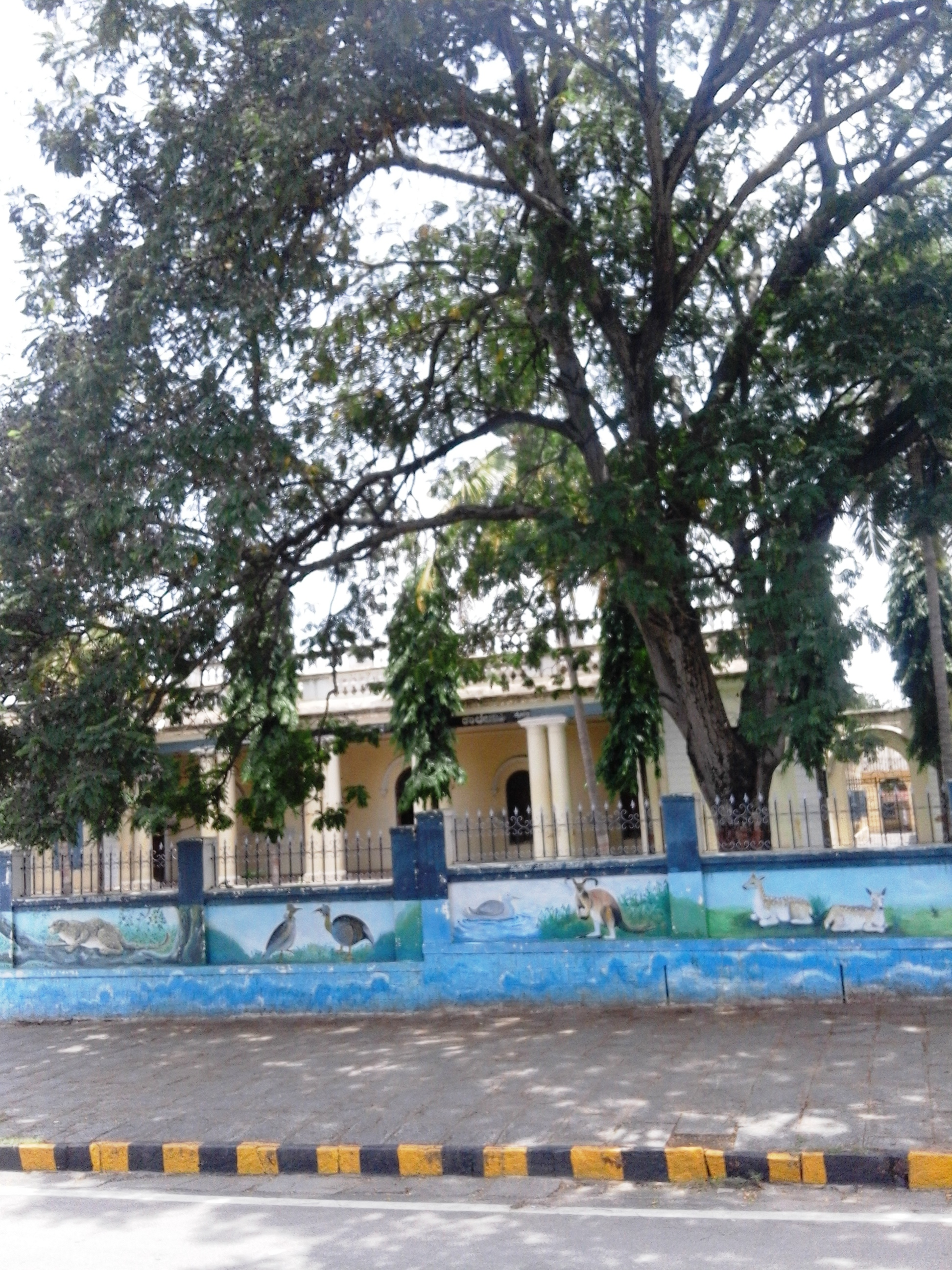
Sanskrit College, Mysore

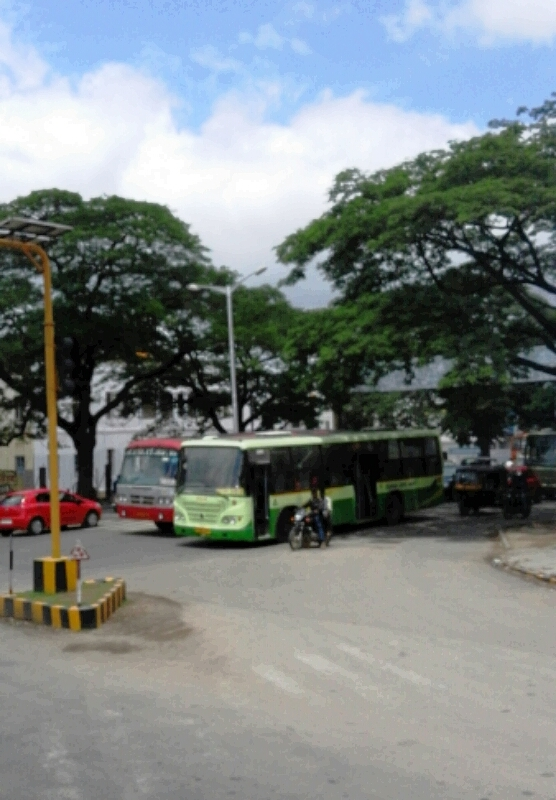
Sanskrit College junction

Srimanmaharaja Samskrita Graduation and Post Graduation Center is an educational institution located in Mysore, Karnataka, India.

== History ==
Sanskrit College, Mysore was established by Krishnaraja Wodeyar III, maharaja of Mysore. After his death, the next king Chamaraja Wodeyar formally opened a Sanskrit School in 1876.

== Curriculum ==
The colleges offers courses in Veda, Agama and Shastra in traditional methods. The campus contains one of the oldest collection of Sanskrit manuscripts. The courses in the college vary from two years to 13 years. The minimum age for enrolment is eight years.

== Alumni ==
Notable alumni include Mysore M. Vasudevacharya, Dr. S.Radhakrishnan, Prof. S.Hiriyanna, Maharaja Jayachamaraja Wodeyar and Naveenam Venkatesha Sastry.

== Courses offered ==
- Sanskrit Prathama. Three Years
- Kavya. Two years
- Sahithya. Three years
- Vyakarana, Nyaya, Meemaamsa, Dharma Sastra, Vishistadwaita, Shakti Vishistadwaita, Adwaita, Alankara (3 years each)
- Vidwat Madhyama (3 years)
- Vidwat Uthama (2 years)
- Rigveda, Shukla Yajurveda, Krishna Yajurveda, Sama Veda (13 years)
- Jaina Shaivagama, Vaikhasana Agama, Pancharathra Agama, Veerashaivagama and Jainagama (5 years each).

== Fellowships ==
Students are admitted and instructed without charging any fee. Hostel facility is also free.
