= Chamarajapuram railway station =

Railway station in Karnataka, India

Chamarajapuram Chamarajapura
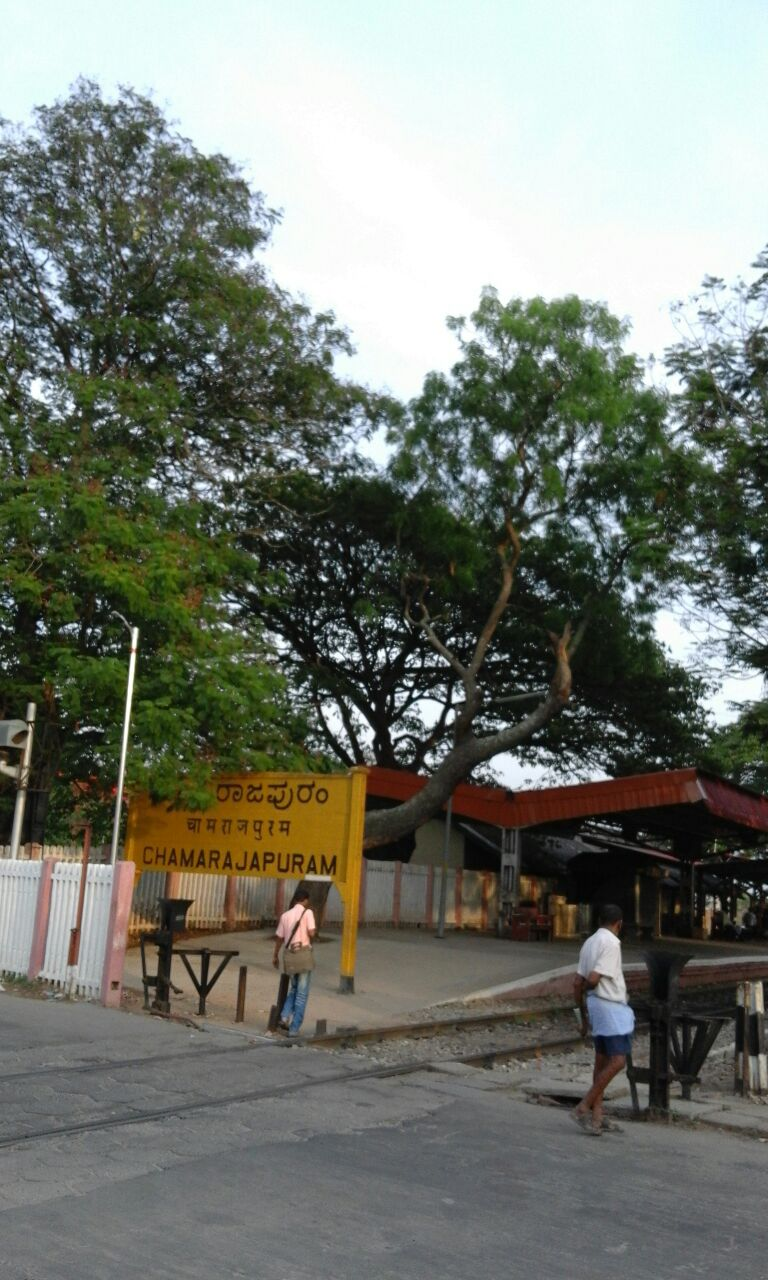
- Chamarajapuram

General information
- Location: Mysore district, Karnataka; India
- Coordinates: 12.298162°N 76.637683°E
- Elevation: 760 m (2,490 ft)
- System: Indian Railways station
- Platforms: 2

Construction
- Structure type: Standard (on ground station)
- Parking: Yes

Other information
- Status: Functioning
- Station code: CMJ
- Zone(s): South Western Railway
- Division(s): Mysore

History
- Opened: 1990
Location

Chamarajapuram is a railway station on Mysore–Chamarajanagar branch line. The station is located in Chamarajapuram, Mysore district, Karnataka state, India.

== Location ==
Chamarajapuram railway station is located near Ballal Circle in K. G. Koppal, Mysore.

== History ==
The gauge-conversion work of the 61 kilometres (38 mi) stretch was completed at a cost of ₹313 crore (US$33 million). There are six trains running forward and backward in this route. Five of them are slow-moving passenger trains.

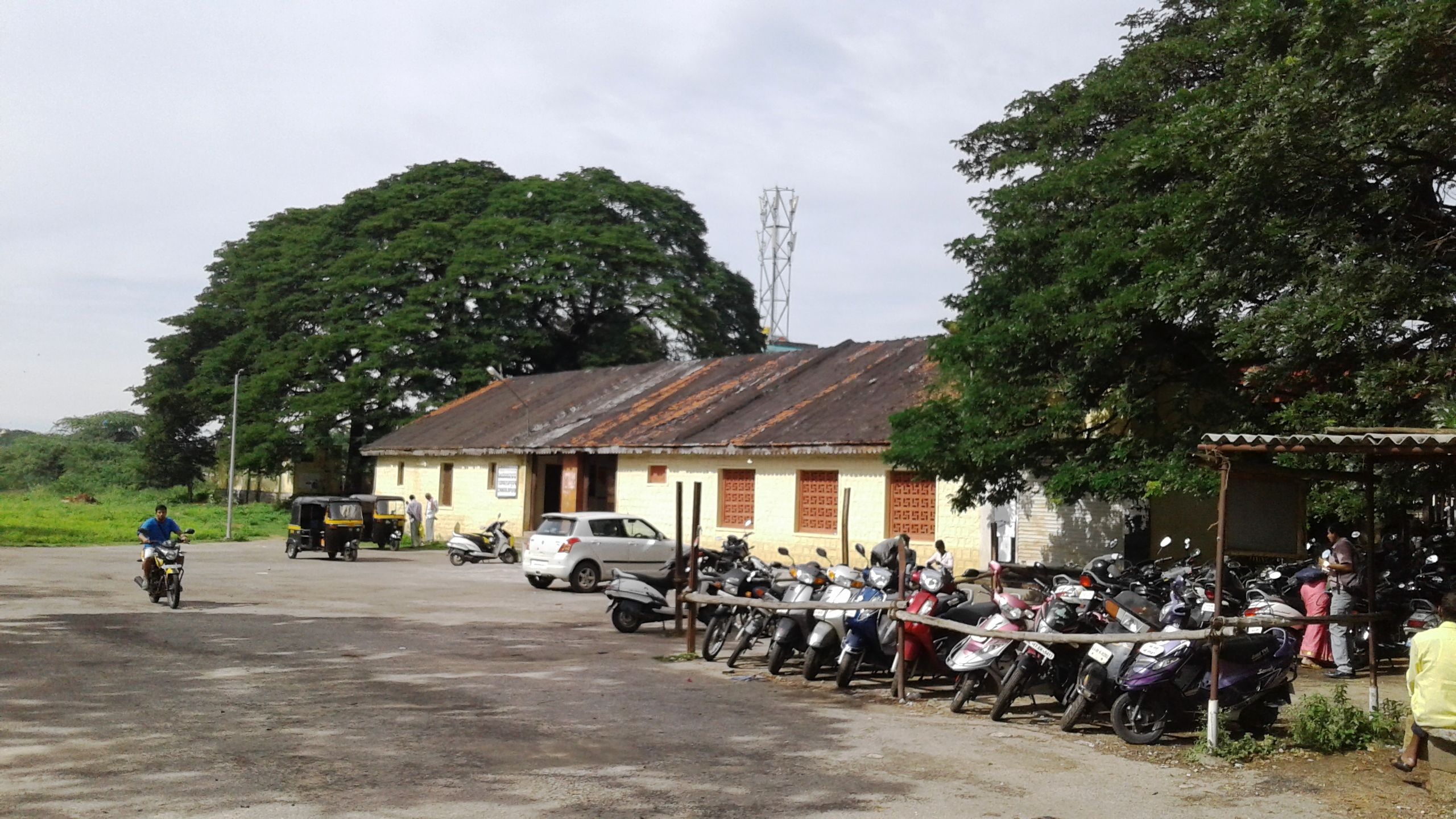
Chamarajapuram Railway Station
