= Chamarajapuram =

Chamarajapuram ಚಾಮರಾಜಪುರಂ
- Urban
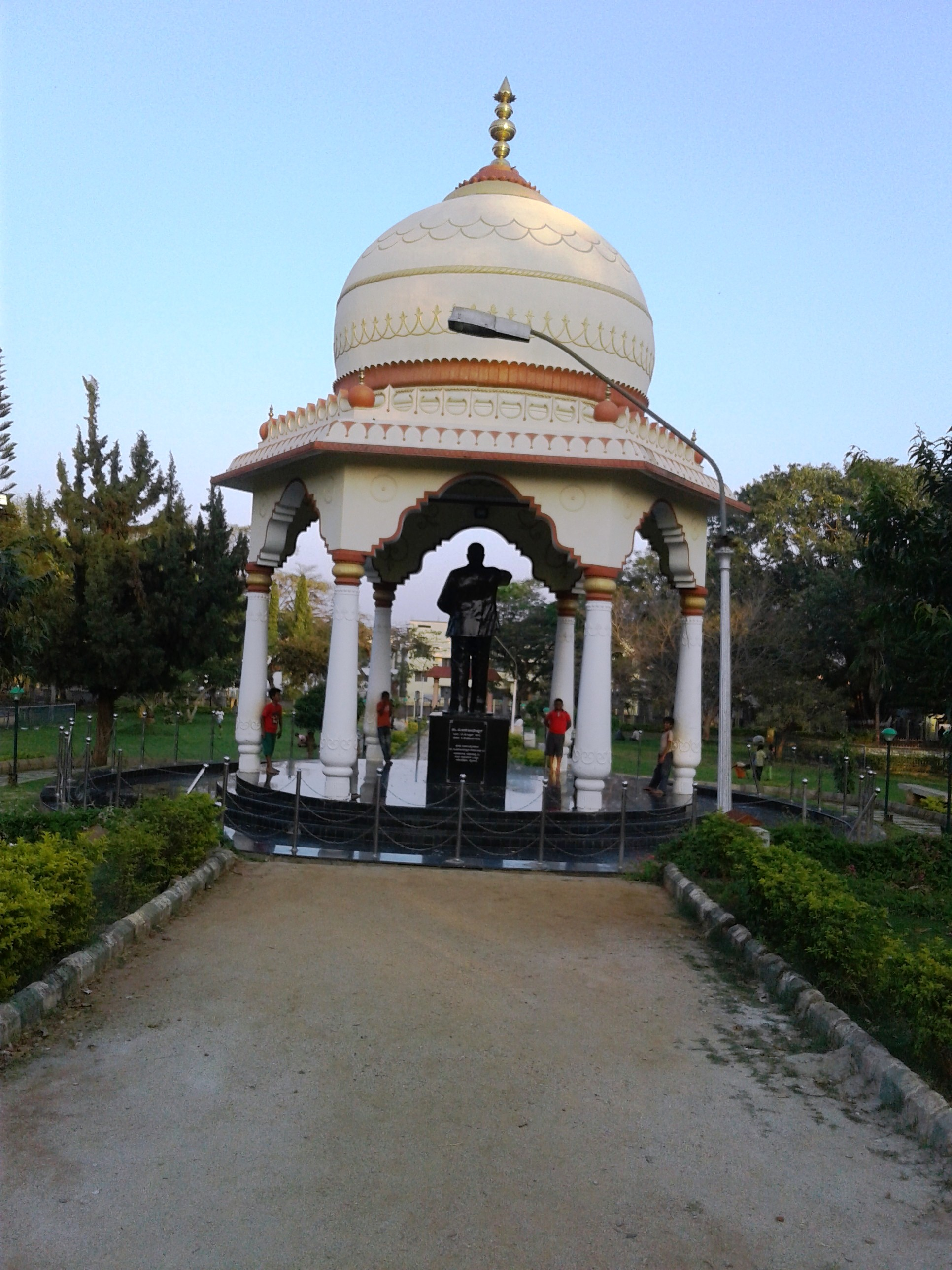
- Location of Chamarajapura in Mysore
- Coordinates: 12°17′44″N 76°38′23″E
- Country: India
- State: Karnataka
- District: Mysore District
- City: Mysore
- Incorporation: 1780s
- Founder: Chamaraja Wodeyar IX, Diwan Purnaiah
- Named for: Chamaraja Wodeyar IX
- Time zone: IST
- Zip: 570005
- STD: 0821

Chamarajapuram is one of the earliest settlements and localities in Mysore, Karnataka, India, located in the centre of the city. Initially an agraharam inhabited by the Mysore nobility, parts of it were later allotted other local dwellers as well.

== History ==
The City Planning Commission of Mysore laid out an urban city planning in as early as 1733 by Maharaja Chamaraja Wadiyar VII, just close to the near-extinction of the Dutch East India Company, when the French Company was at its peak in South India and the British Company had just entered the South. However, execution of the plan began in around the 1780s by Diwan Purnaiah when under the Sultan of Mysore Tipu. At the time of its completion, Maharaja Chamarajendra Wodeyar IX was reigning, after whom Chamarajapuram is named.

== Constituency ==
Chamarajapuram falls under the Mysore Constituency in the Lok Sabha (national election) maps. In Vidhana Sabha (state election) maps, Chamarajapuram falls under Krishnaraja Constituency.

== Lanes and Boulevards ==
Several roads and areas have been commemorative of numerous Mysore and Karnataka era celebrities.

- Bajjanna Lane, named after Bajjanna, a wealthy philanthropist working for the Palace, who laid waterworks for the area
- Dr Vishnuvardhan Road, named after Vishnuvardhan
- K.G.Koppal, named after Kennegowda, a palace wrestler

== In popular culture ==
The cover illustration of R K Laxman's Malgudi Days is a painted railway station which was inspired by Chamarajapuram Railway Station.

== Notable people ==
- T Chowdiah, famously known as Pitil Chowdiah, a violin and fiddle maestro in Mysore Palace
- M H Ambareesh, T Chowdiah's grandson and Kannada film actor
- M A Chandan Kumar, T Chowdiah's great-grandson, a flautist
- T T Srinivasa Varadāchār, a dharmašhāstra āsthāna vidwan in Mysore Palace
- T T Srinivasa Gopālāchār, T T Srinivasa Varadāchār's son, also a dharmašhāstra āsthāna vidwan
- T. P. Kailasam, popular Modern Kannada author and playwright, lived in K G Koppal for a brief period

== See also ==
- Chamarajapuram Railway Station
- Kuvempunagar
- Jayanagar
- Ashokapuram
