= Dewan of Mysore =

Prime minister of the Kingdom of Mysore

- Maisūrina Divānaru
- Style: The Honourable Dewan Bahadur
- Status: Abolished
- Reports to: Maharaja of Mysore
- Seat: Mysore, Kingdom of Mysore
- Appointer: Maharaja of Mysore
- Term length: 4 years or at the pleasure of the Maharaja
- Precursor: Dalvoy
- Formation: 1782
- First holder: K. Purnaiah
- Final holder: Sir A.R. Mudaliar
- Abolished: 1950
- Succession: Chief Minister of Mysore

The Dewan of Mysore (sometimes spelled Diwan) was the de facto chief executive officer of the Government of Mysore (now Government of Karnataka), ex officio chairman of the Dewan's Council (now Cabinet), and the prime minister and royal adviser to the maharaja of Mysore. The role evolved in title and duties since the foundation of the fiefdom of Mysore in 1350 and its proper reformation into a kingdom in the following centuries until the kingdom's full abolishment in 1950. With the constitution of India into a republic in 1950, the position was replaced by Chief Minister of Mysore (later renamed Chief Minister of Karnataka).

From offering minor political advice to the monarch as amatya (Sanskrit for minister) like in the Vijayanagara Empire to later acting as a major military chieftain as dalvoy (Kannada for military chief) like in other southern kingdoms to being the head of the government as dewan (Persian/Urdu for accountant or chief adviser) like in the Ottoman Empire, the role has transmuted in powers over time.

From being handpicked by the monarch to being elected through popular suffrage, the mode of appointment and appointer also changed.

== Formation and abolishment ==
=== Dalvoy ===
Until the mid-18th century, the role of the monarch's adviser was known as dalvoy, also spelled as dalavay or dalvi, under the Wadiyars. The word dalvoy is a vernacular form of the Sanskrit word dalapati (commander-in-chief).

Owing to the deposition of Maharaja Krishnaraja Wadiyar II by his own dalvoy Hyder Ali and his assumption as the supreme leader in 1761, until after Ali's son Tipu was briefly in that position, the role of dalvoy became abandoned.

=== Dewan ===
After Ali's death in 1782, Tipu assumed absolute over Mysore and officially created the office of the Dewan of Mysore when he made his longtime childhood friend and his father's aide K. Purnaiah his adviser and a military strategist. Tipu considerably de-recognised the maharajas and the role of dewan was gradually ever more codified into government. The role as dewan became so popular under Tipu that later on, Princely India created the role and the title in their governments, such as Dewan of Kashmir, Travancore, Hyderabad, Baroda, Indore, etc.

After Tipu's death in 1799, British India installed Krishnaraja Wadiyar III as the maharaja. The Wadiyars continued appointing to the role of dewan after resumption of power, starting with Purnaiah himself being continued. Under the maharajas, it became one of the most venerable, esteemed, and celebrated leadership roles in princely India.

=== Chief minister ===
In 1950, after the accession of the Kingdom of Mysore into the Republic of India, all titles and positions ascribed to the kingdom were abolished, including that of the dewan. It was replaced by Chief Minister of Mysore State, now renamed Chief Minister of Karnataka.

The role as dewan remained active in Mysore through one sultan and four maharajas. There have been a total of 24 dewans and two acting dewans. Most dewans during the latter years were civil servants in the Indian Imperial Service or Mysore Police Service.

== Dewans ==
The first Dewan of Mysore was K. Purnaiah selected by Tipu, who served almost three decades from 1782 to 1811 and two rulers. The last dewan was A. R. Mudaliar under Maharaja Jayachamaraja Wadiyar, who served from 1946 to 1949. Other popular dewans of Mysore include C. V. Rungacharlu, K. Seshadri Iyer, M. Visvesvaraya, M. Kantharaj Urs, and Mirza Ismail.

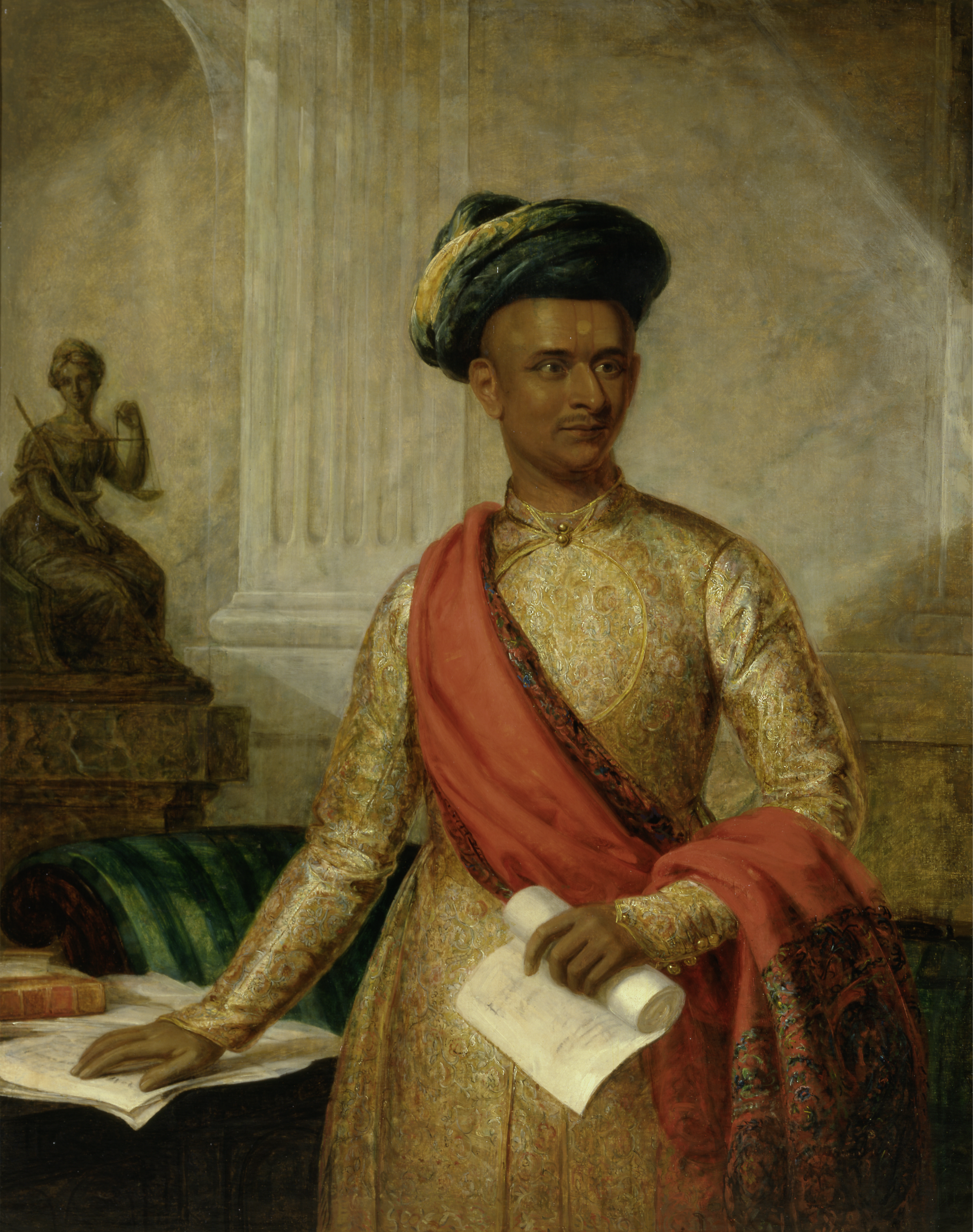
K. Purnaiah, the first dewan of Mysore

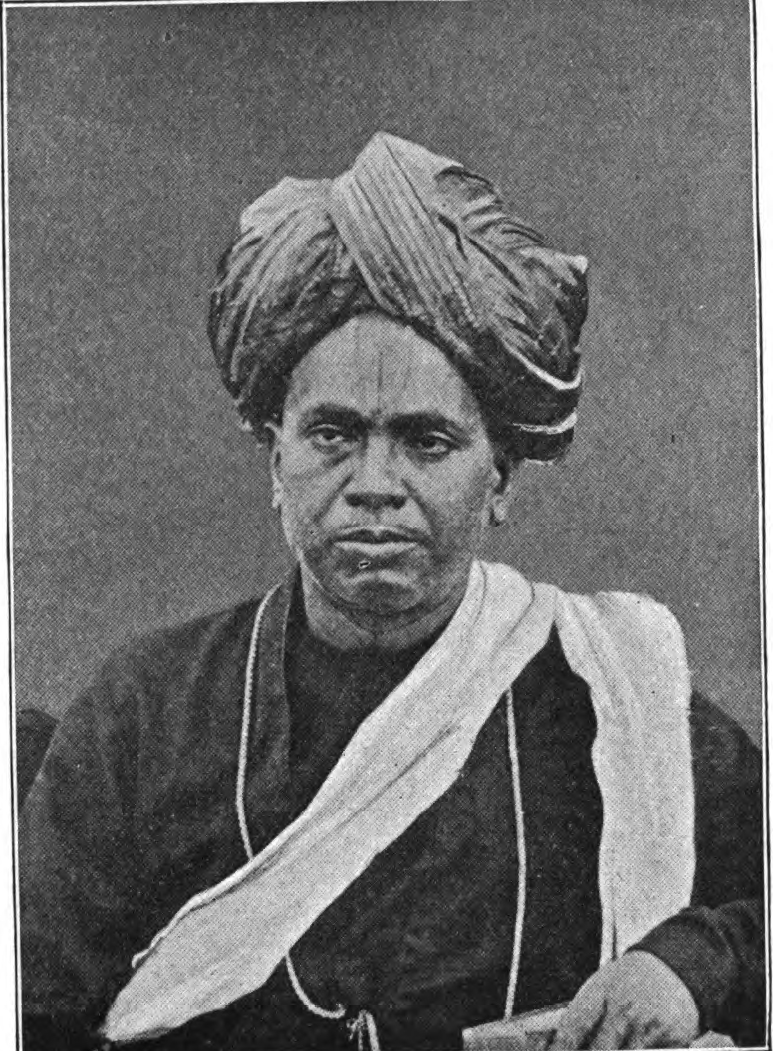
C. V. Rungacharlu, the 14th dewan of Mysore, who was instrumental in the Rendition of Mysore Act

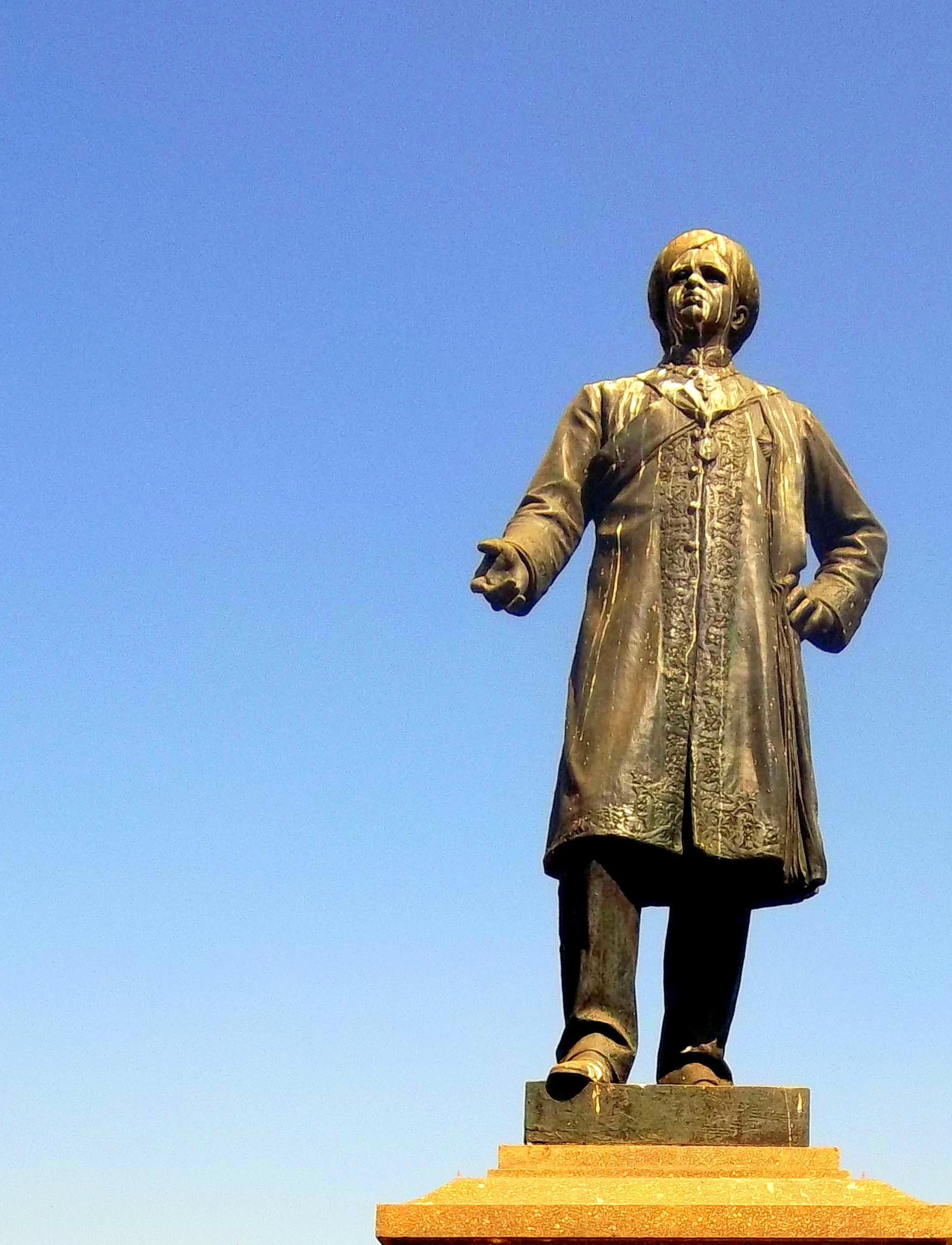
A statue of K Sheshadri Iyer in Bangalore. He was the 15th dewan of Mysore and was instrumental in Bangalore's public infrastructure development

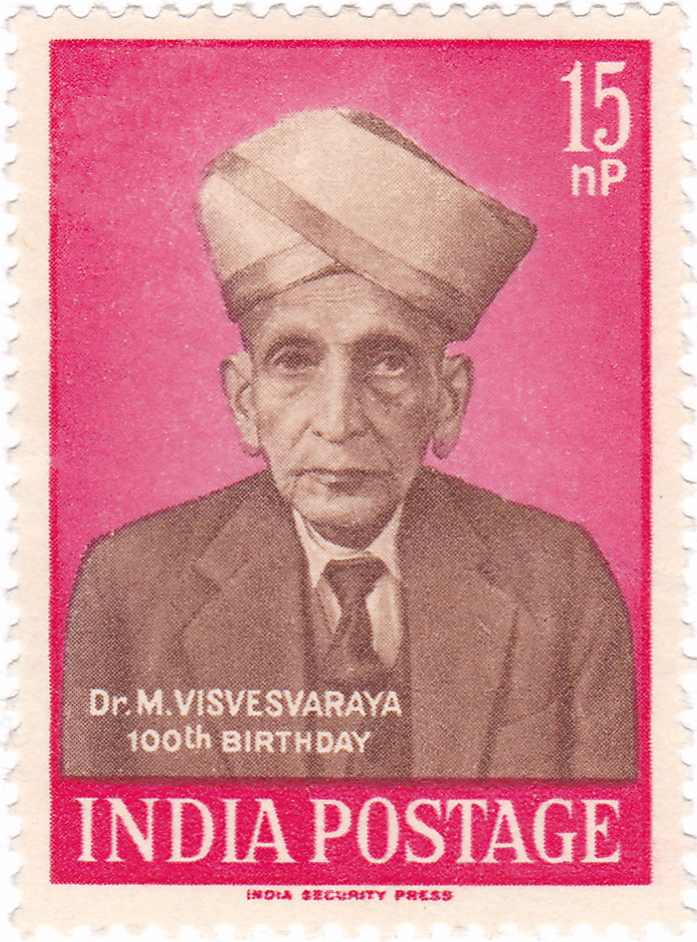
M Visvesvaraya's centenary postage stamp. He was the 19th dewan of Mysore and was key to making Mysore a modern state

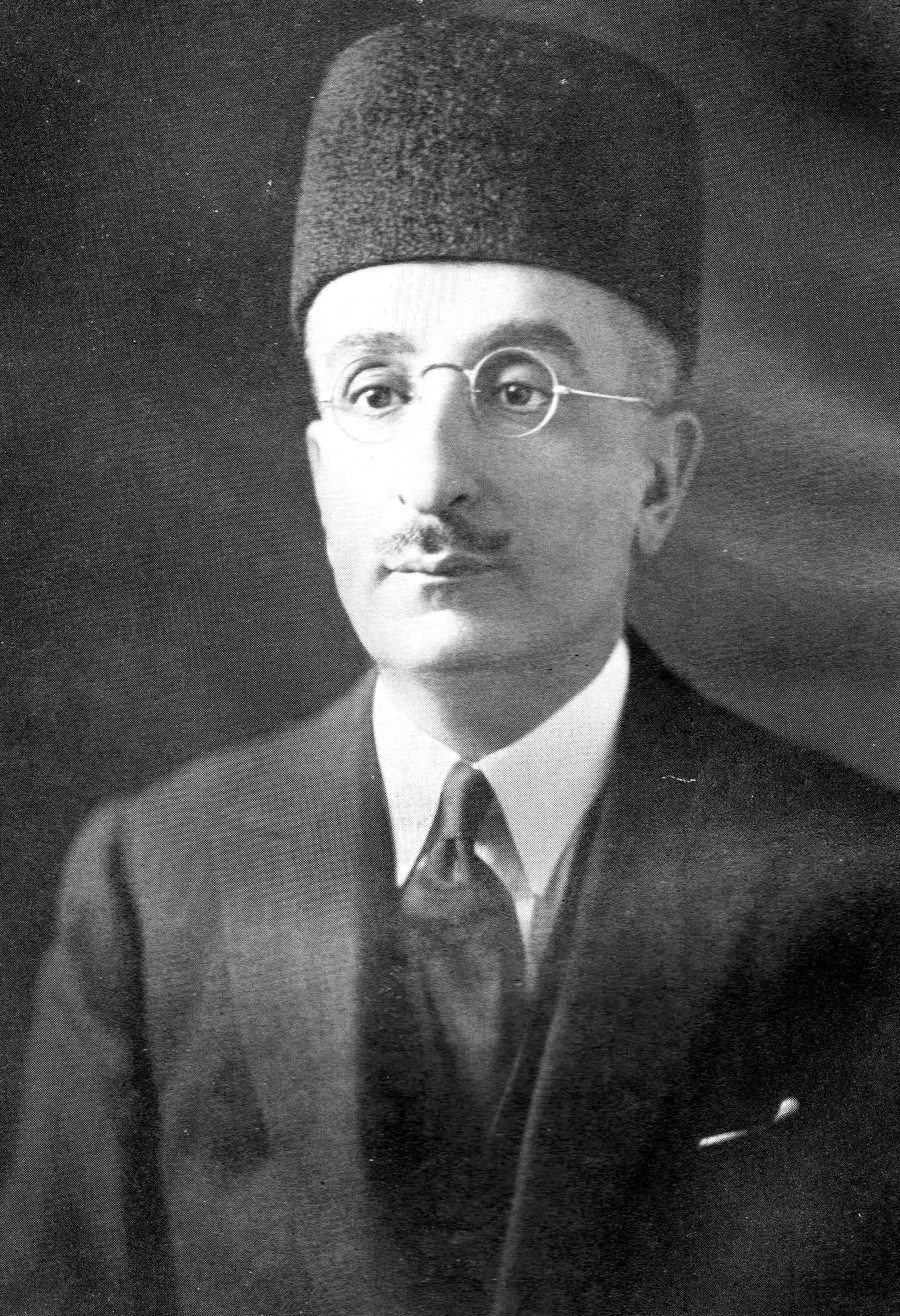
Mirza Ismail, the 22nd dewan of Mysore, mentored by Dewan M. Visvesvaraya. He was a close confidant of Maharaja Krishnaraja Wadiyar IV and helped thrive industries

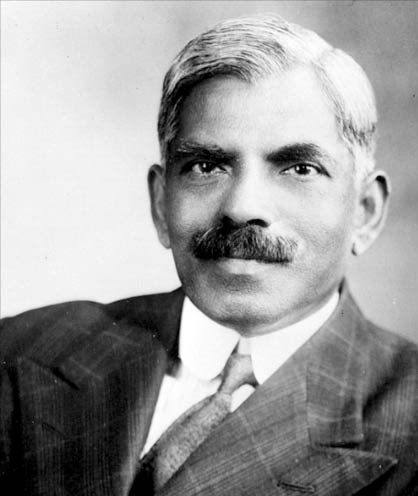
Arcot Ramasamy Mudaliar, the 24th and last dewan of Mysore

Many of the dewans are associated with several industrial, financial, public infrastructure, and educational initiatives undertaken during their terms. These initiatives include almost all works assigned by the king or undertaken by the dewans themselves. This includes activities like setting up and maintaining industries like dams for irrigation like hydroelectric power plants on the Shivanasamudra Falls and the Jog Falls in 1902, Visvesvaraya Iron and Steel Plant in 1923, Krishna Raja Sagara in 1924, Hindustan Aeronautics Limited in 1940, Mysore Lamps, Mysore Chemical and Fertilisers Factory, Mysore Paper Mills, Mysore Paints and Varnish Limited, among others. Bangalore was the first city in India to get electric streetlights in 1905 under P. N. Krishnamurti. The State Bank of Mysore was established in 1913 at M. Visvesvaraya's initiative.

== See also ==
- List of dewans of Mysore
- Chief Minister of Karnataka
- List of chief ministers of Karnataka
- List of dewans of Travancore
- List of dewans of Hyderabad
