= Chamaraja Road, Mysore =

Street in Mysore, India

Coordinates: 12.302612292175874°N 76.64361932747211°E

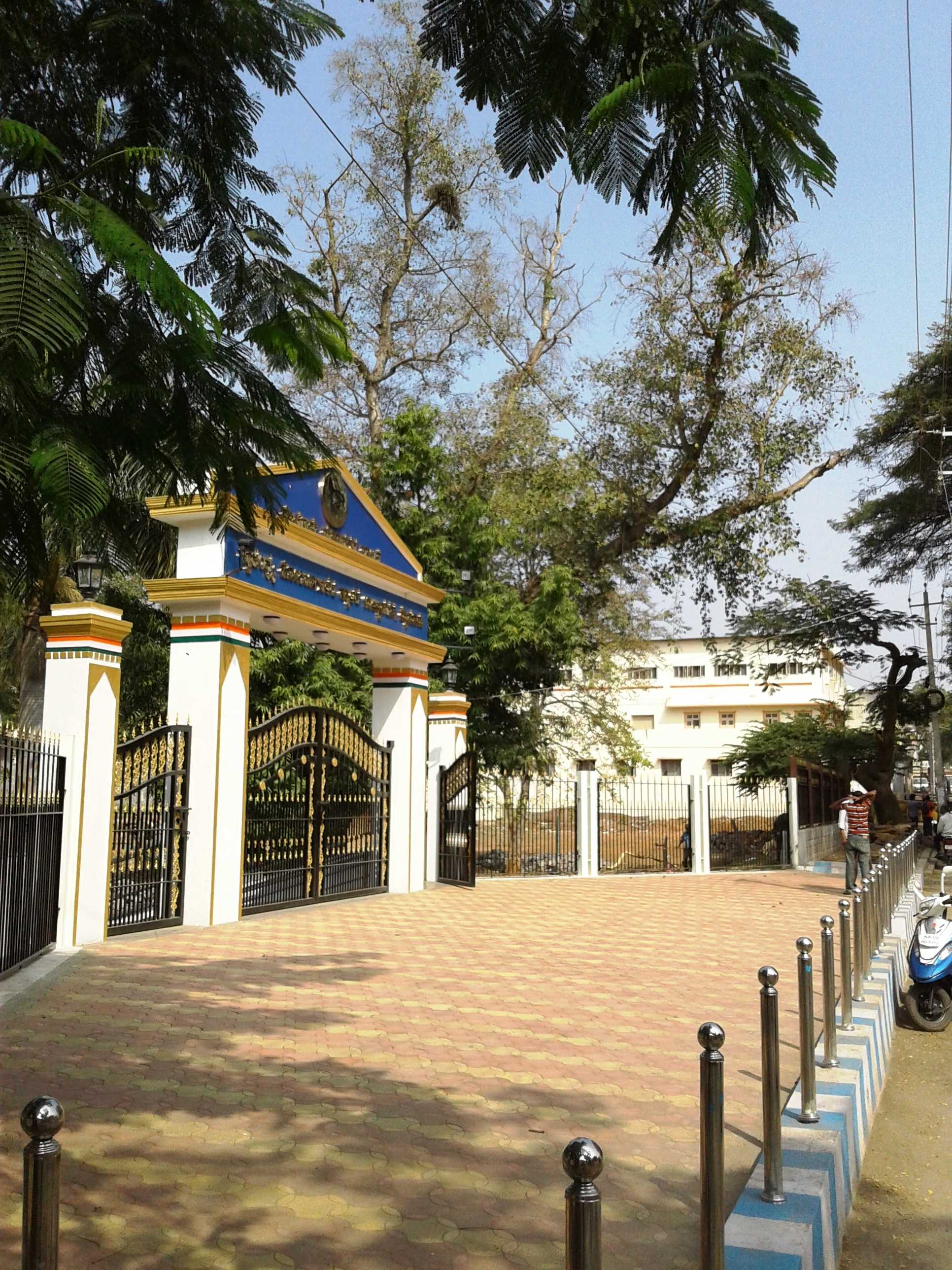
Freedom fighters Park

Chamaraja Road or Chamarajendra double Road is an important main street in downtown Mysore city, Karnataka state, India.

== Location ==
Chamaraja Road is located on the southern side of the city center. Other important roads like Kantharaja Urs Road, Krishnaraja Boulevard Road, Jhansi Lakshmi Bai Road, Dewan's Road, Narayana Shastry Road, Thyagaraja Road, Sayyajirao Road, Ramanuja Road and Uttaradhi Mutt Road connect with it and the road terminates with Mysore-Ooty Road near JSS Circle.

Chamaraja Road begins at Kantharaja Urs Road near Fire Brigade circle of Saraswathipuram. It passes the southern side of the Freedom fighters Park and has many landmarks en route.

== Important landmarks ==
- University Engineering Division
- Muslim Hostel complex
- Arasu Boaarding school ground
- University Pavilion ground
- Maharajas degree college
- Maharajas degree college Hostel
- Sitaraghava press and pharmaceuticals
- Freedom fighters Park
- Jetty Hospital
- Lakshmi Theatre
- Gayathri Theatre
- Sahakara Bhavan
- Sanskrit Pathashala
- Public offices building
- Basaveshwara Circle
- JSS Mahavidyapeetha
- JSS Circle

== Length ==
Dewan's Road is about 2.2 kilometers in length.

== History ==
Chamaraja double road is named after Chamaraja Wodeyar X, Maharaja of Mysore GCSI (1863–1894; r. 1868–94) CI (1866–1934; Regent of Mysore: 30 December 1894 – 8 August 1902).

== Post office ==
The Postal Index Number of Chamaraja double Road is 570004 as it comes under Mysore Fort Post Office.

== See also ==
- Devaraj Urs Road, Mysore
