= Devaraj Urs Road =

Street in Mysore, India

Coordinates: 12.30950°N 76.64627°E

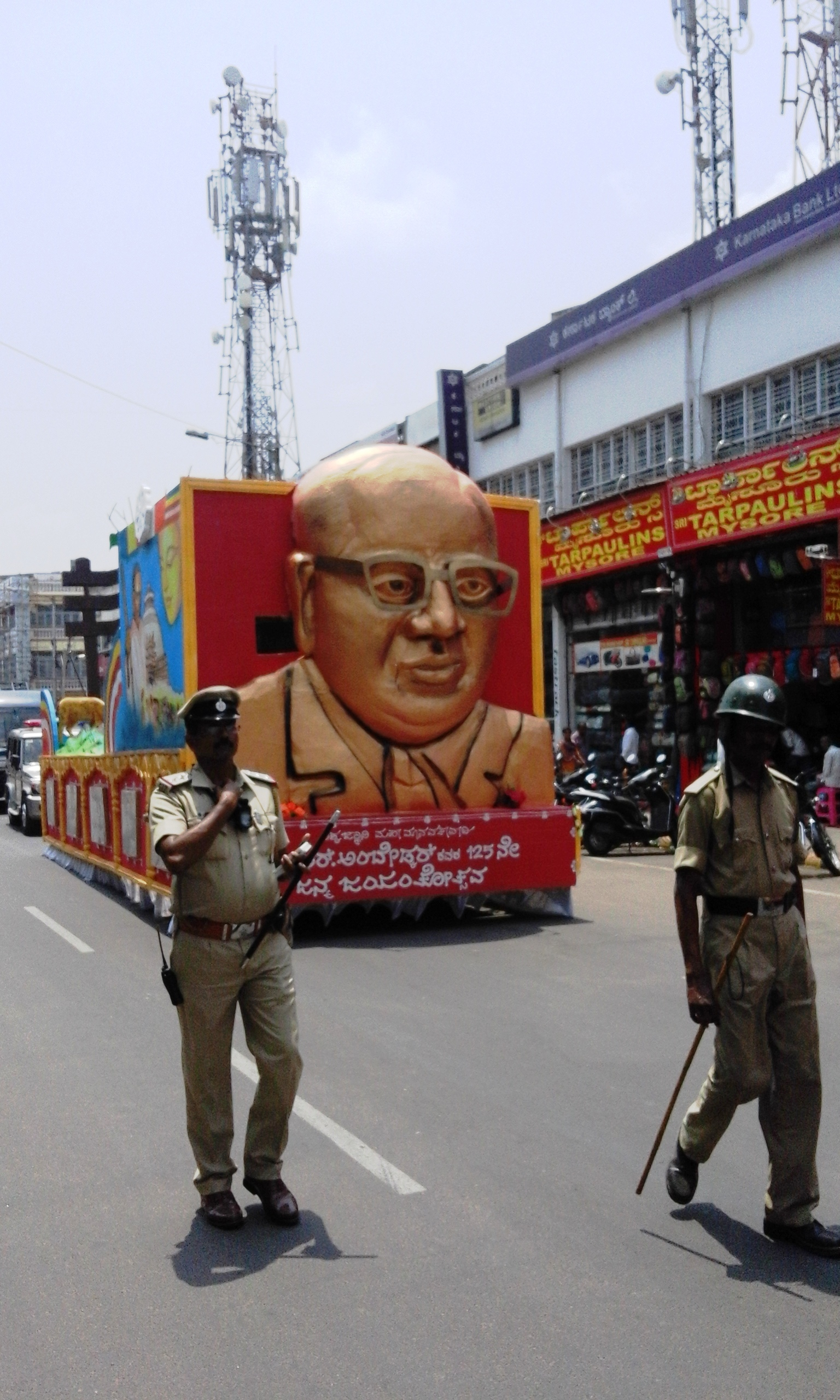

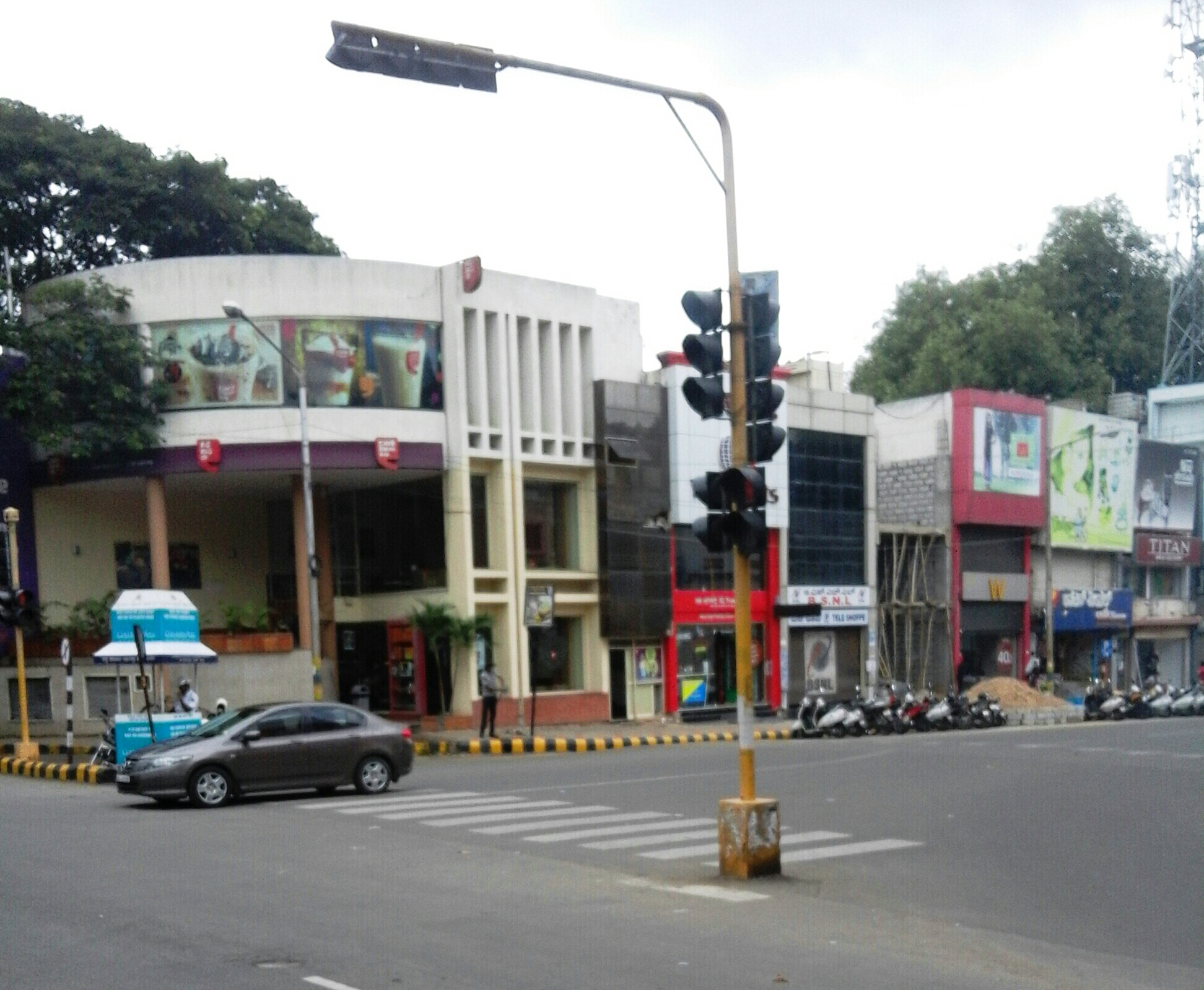
Devaraj Urs Road begins from Café Coffee Day

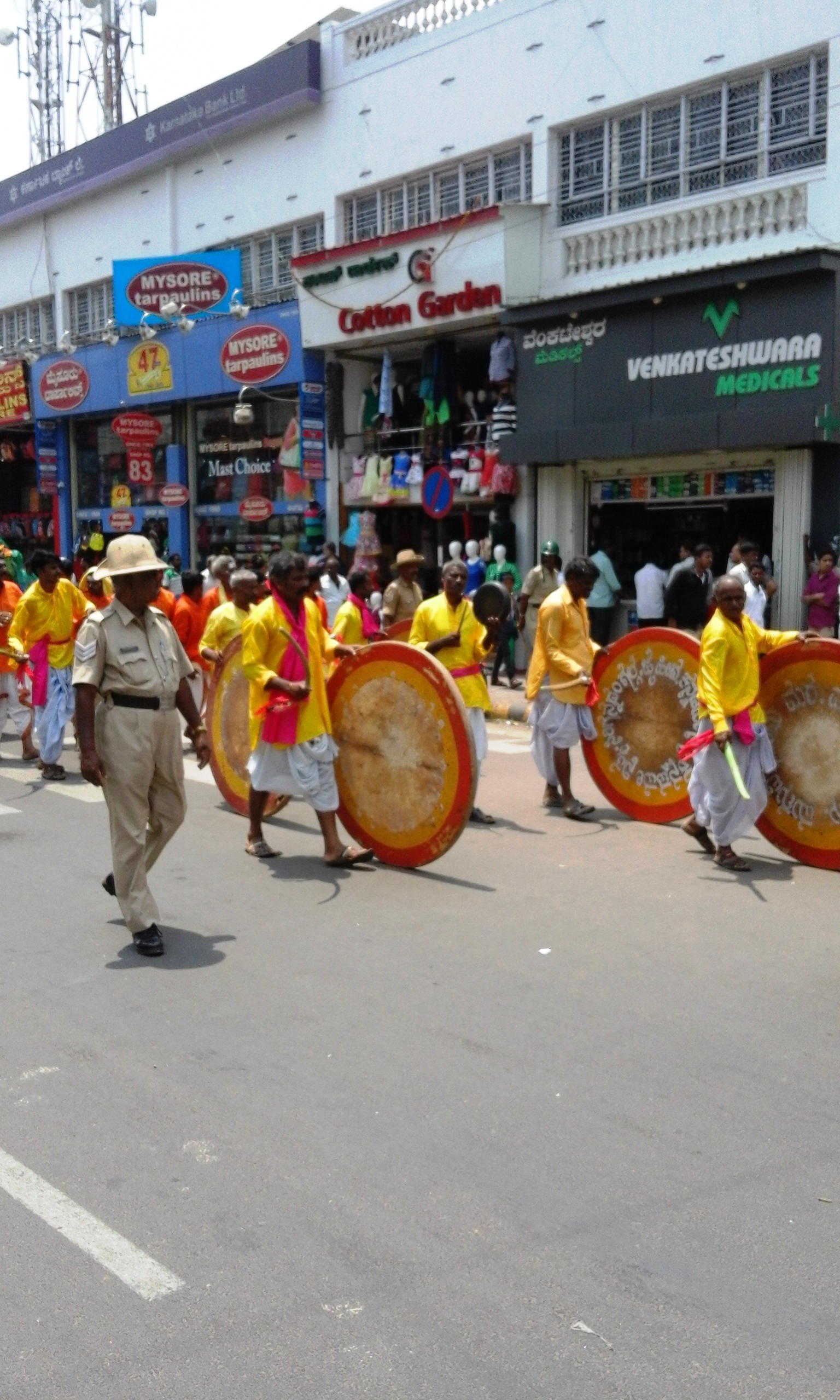
Devaraj Urs road in festive mood

D. Devaraj Urs Road is the most prominent shopping street of Mysore city in Karnataka state, India. This street is also the center of the downtown or the Central business district area in the city. In post office parlance, Devaraj Urs road is known as Mysore One.

== History ==
This street was named after Devaraj Urs, the former Chief Minister of Karnataka. He was a popular chief minister and a reformist. This area was formerly called Devaraja Mohalla and a weekly market was regularly conducted here. The location of the market became the present Devaraja Market.

== Location ==
Devaraj Urs road is about one mile in length. There are many parallel roads connecting to Devaraj Urs Road and a total of two square kilometer area makes up the downtown of Mysore city. The street has an east–west orientation. K.R.Circle comes in the northwest corner of the Mysore palace and Devaraj Urs Road starts here. JLB Road joins the Devaraj Urs road near the Maharani's College.

== Nature of business ==
Most of the shops in the Devaraj Urs Road are those selling clothes and ornaments. There are also branches of leading banks here. Restaurants are not many but a few of them are available in the parallel roads. Parking is allowed on one side of the road and the entire street is one way. There is only one coffee shop but the smell of coffee permeates the atmosphere because there are many shops selling fresh coffee powder. All buildings on this road has a similar façade.

== Modern period ==
In the modern period, Mysore has seen the experiment of opening many shopping malls in different parts of the city. But the footfall on Devaraj Market still continues to be the highest in the city for a number of reasons. One is the proximity to the city bus station and the other is access to the railway station which is only one kilometer from here.

== Timings ==
Unlike in the west, shops in Mysore open late and close early. Most shops close by nine in the evening some stretching up to 10 pm.

== See also ==
- Dewan's Road, Mysore
- Dufferin Clock Tower
- Mandi Mohalla
- St. Philomena's Cathedral, Mysore

== Gallery ==
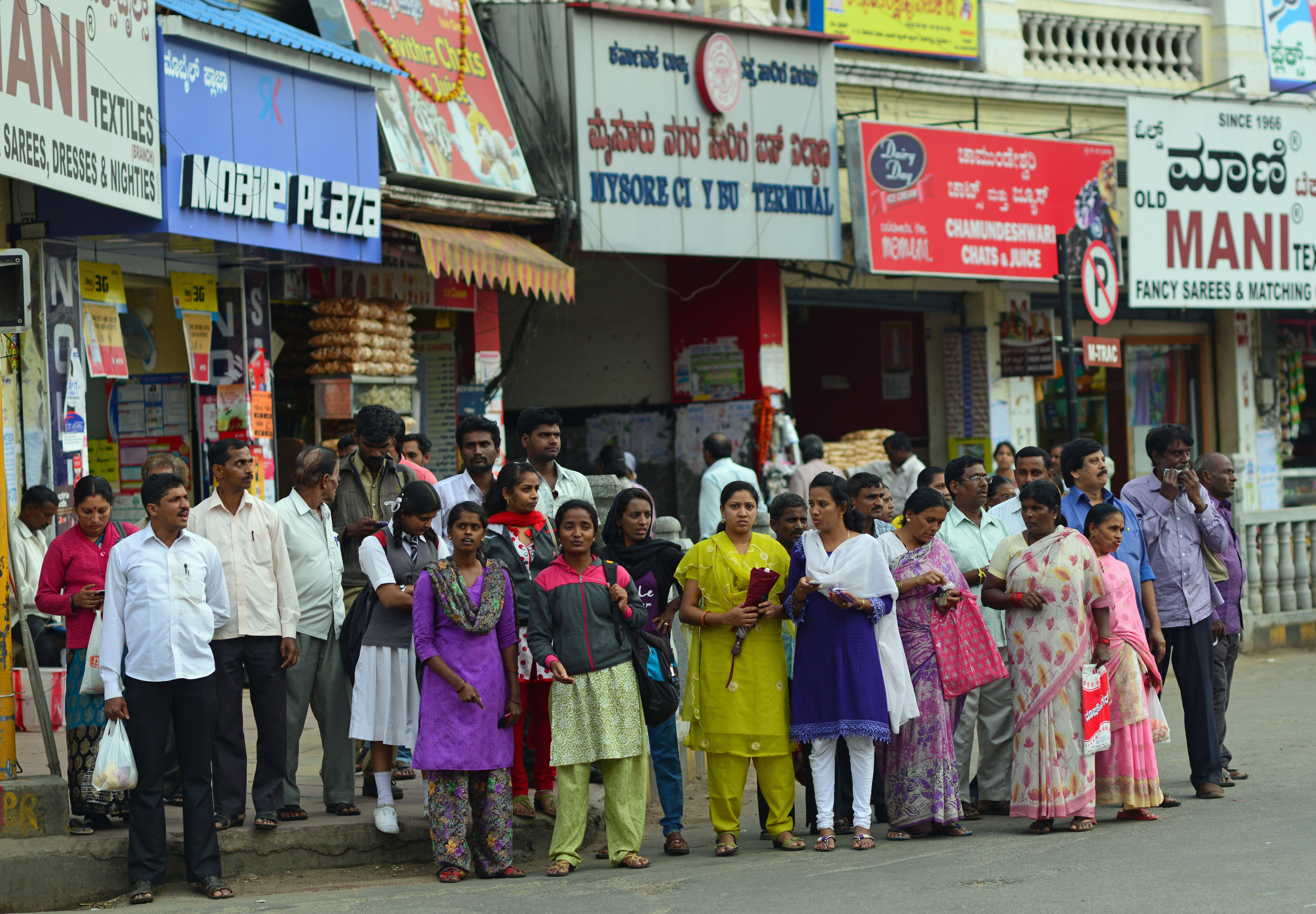
K. R. Circle

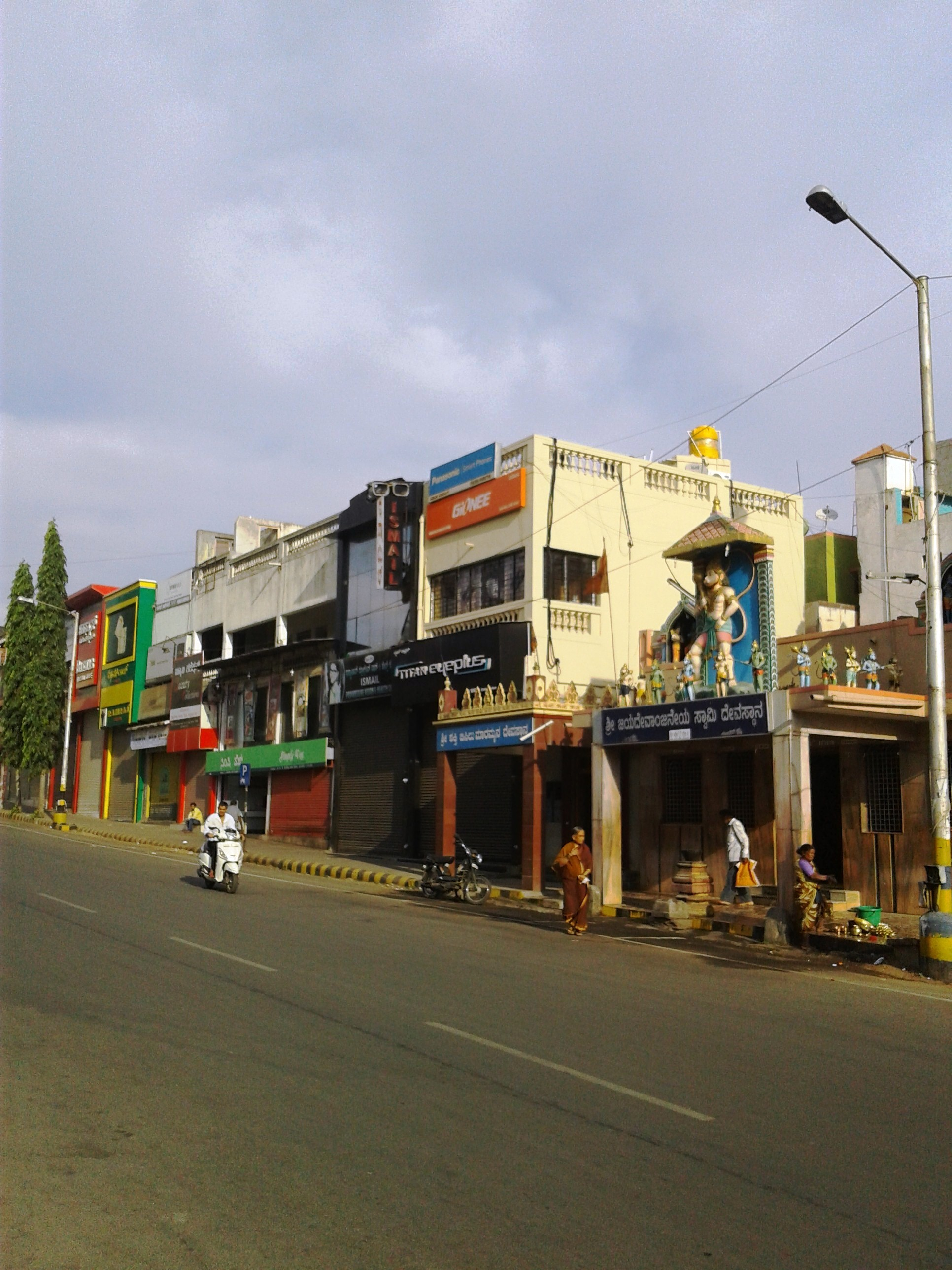
Anjaneya Temple

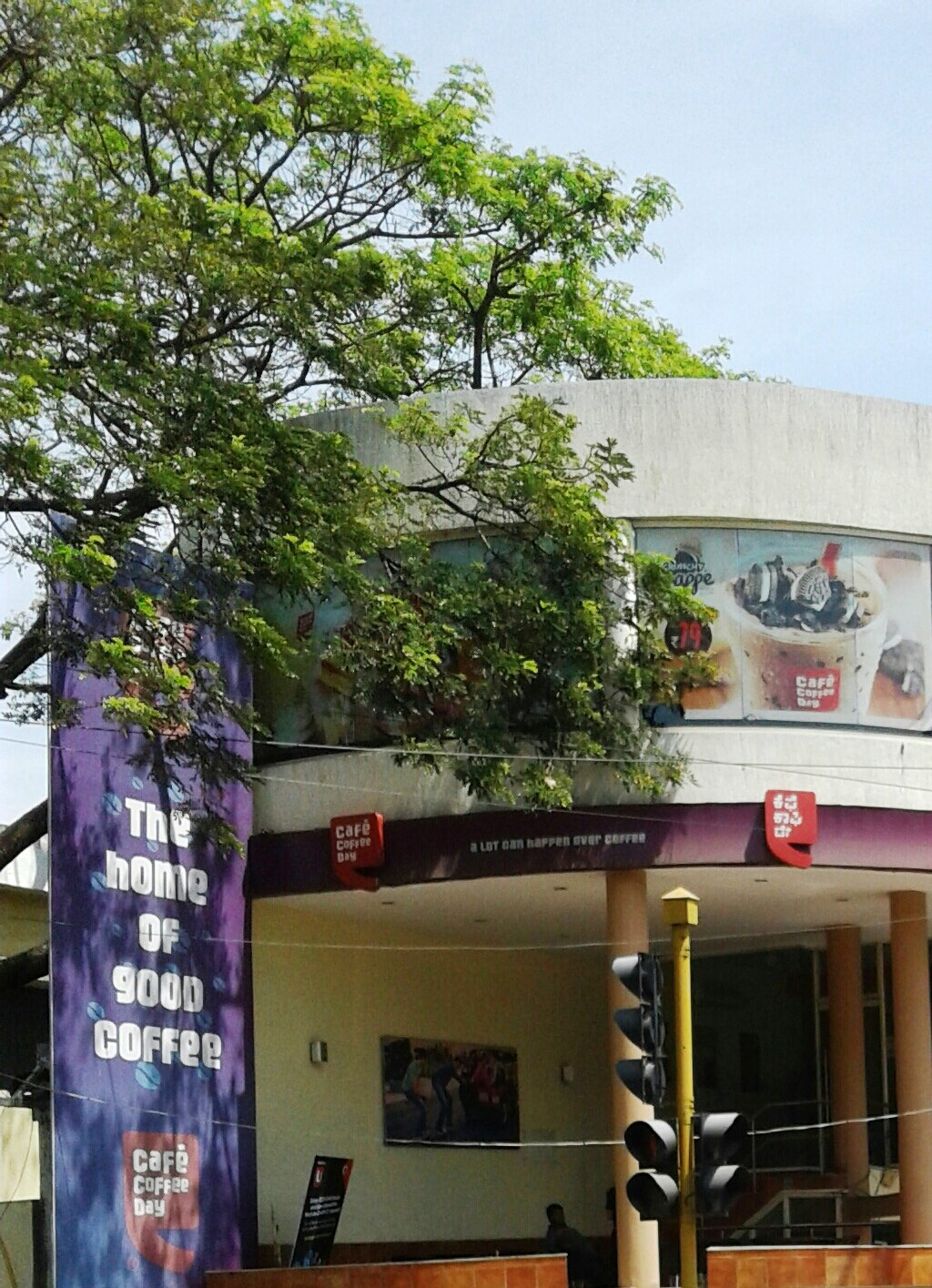
Cafe Coffee Day

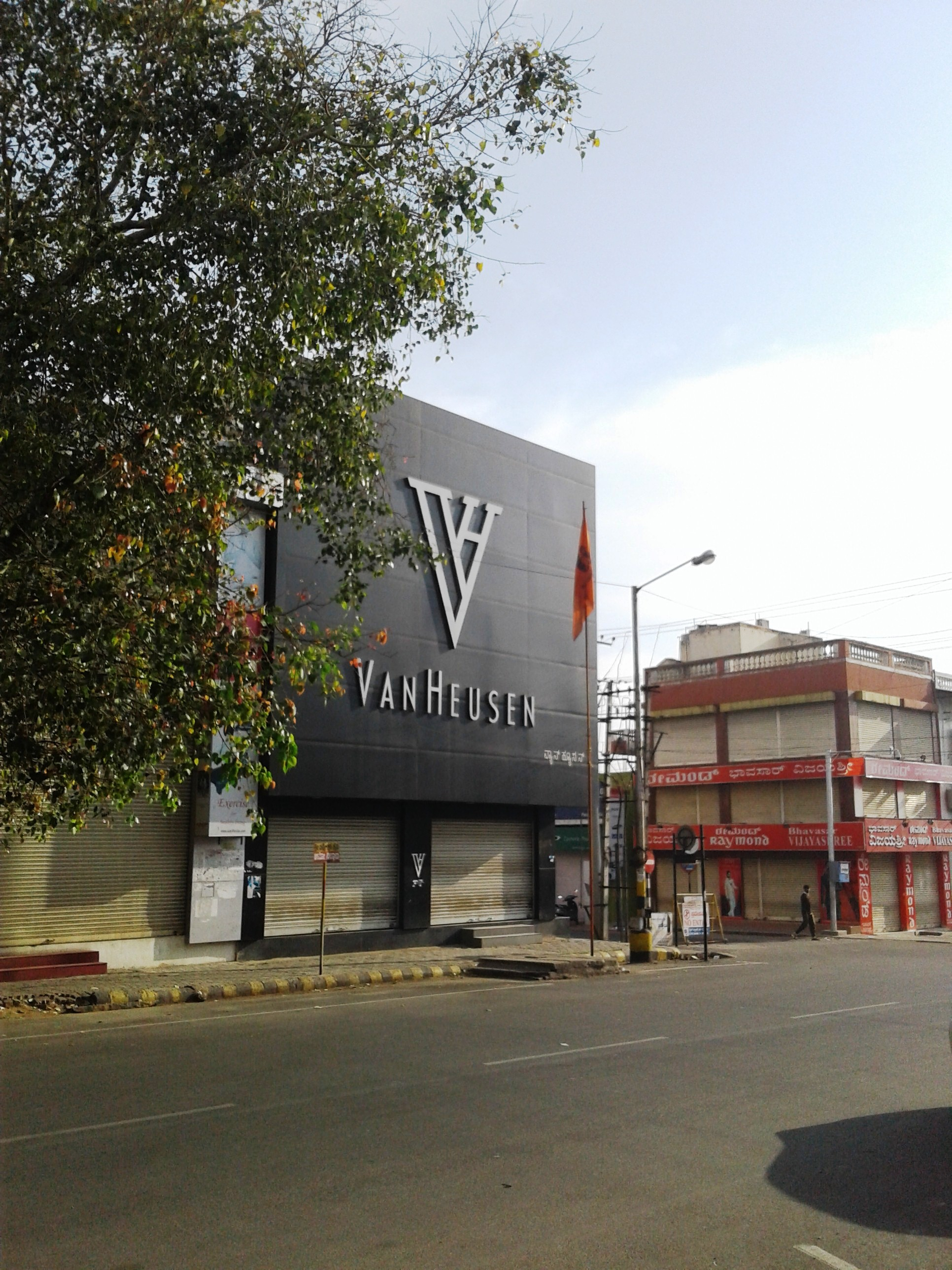
Upper End
