= Dufferin Clock Tower =

Clock tower in Karnataka province, India

Coordinates: 12.30953°N 76.65227°E

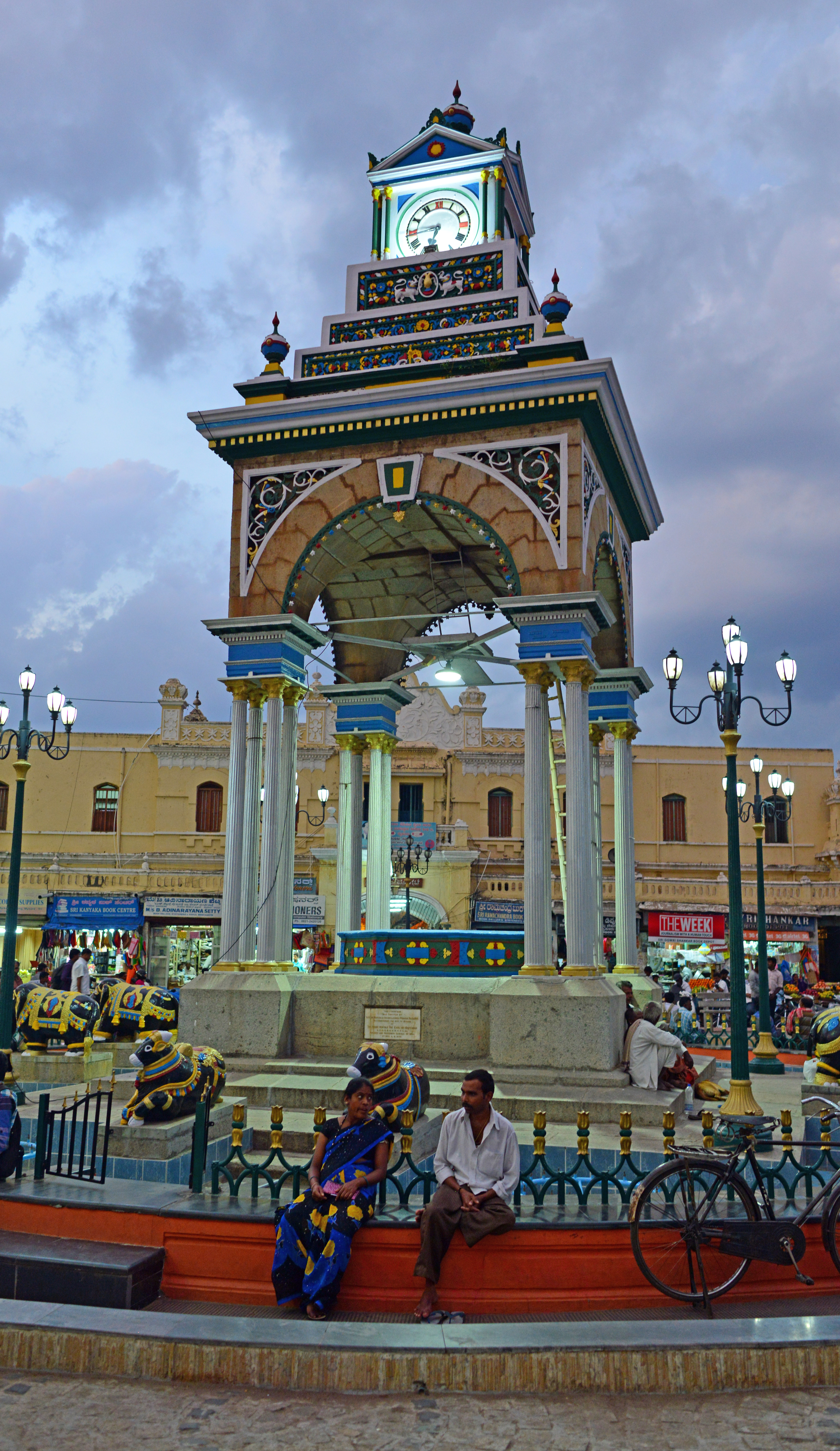
The clock tower in 2015

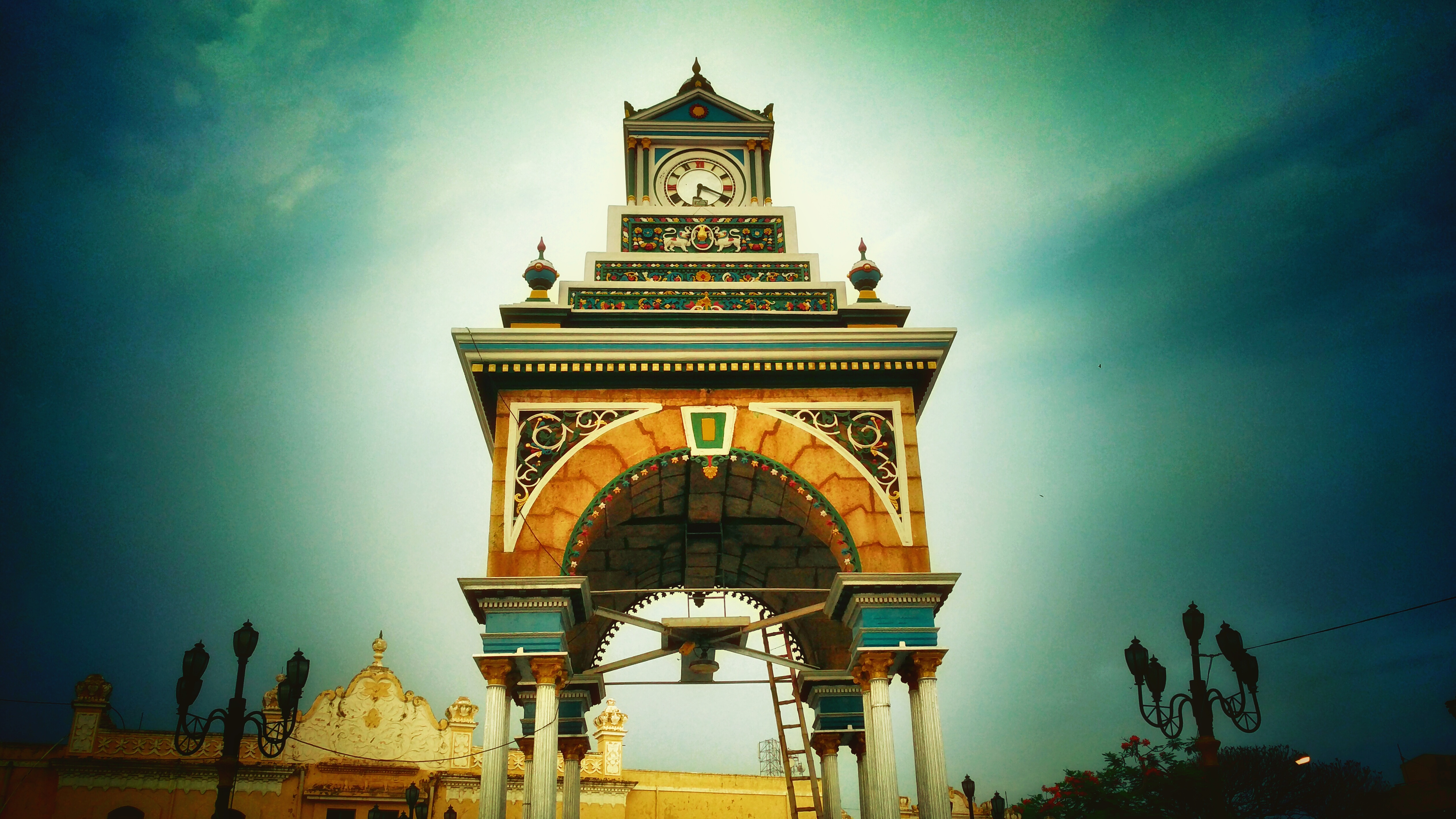
Dufferin Clock Tower

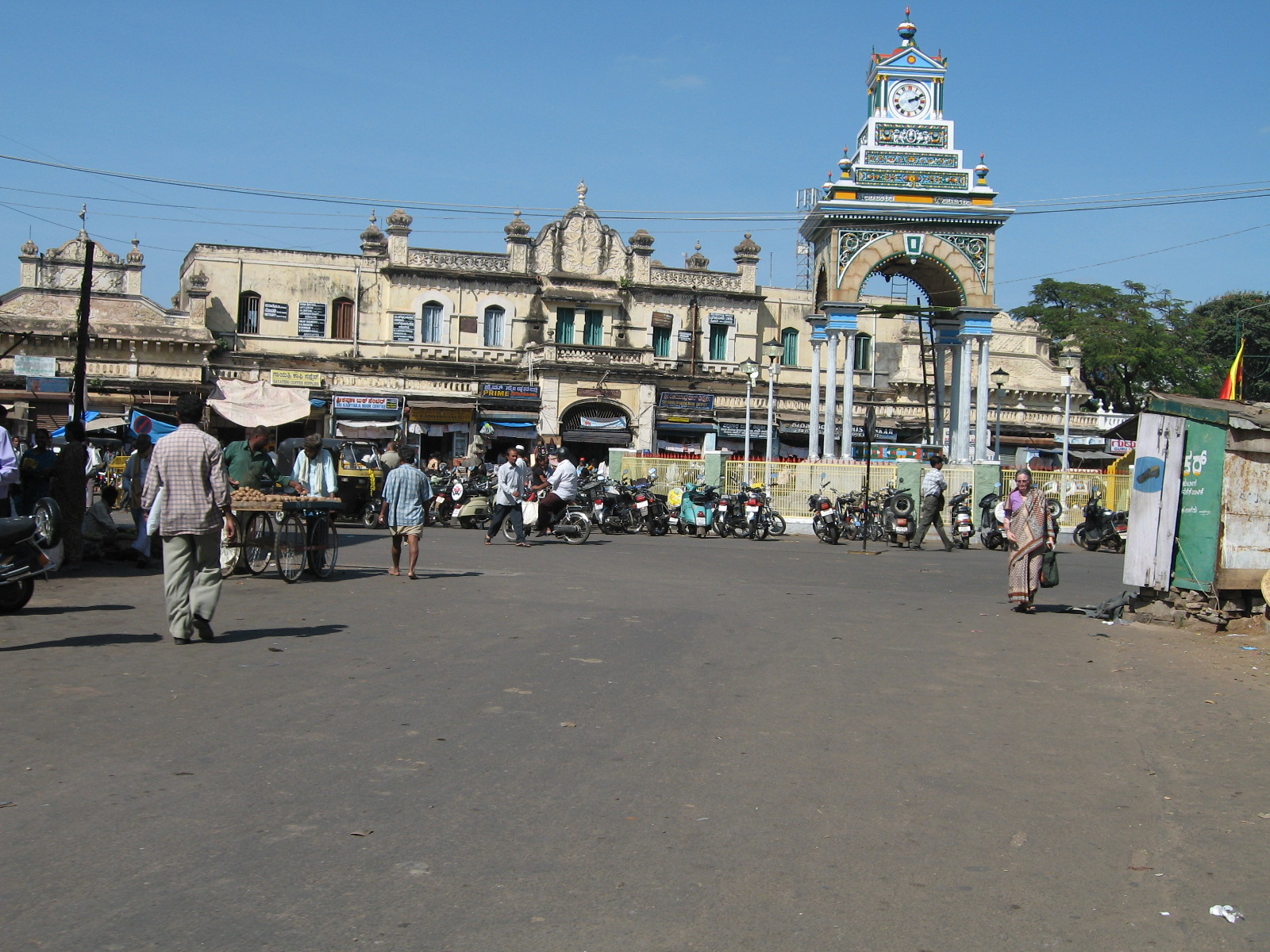
The clock tower before renovation

The clock tower after renovation in 2012

Dufferin Clock Tower is a historic relic and heritage structure of Mysore city in Karnataka province, India.

== Location ==
The Dufferin Clock Tower is located near the new bus station in Mysore in front of the Deveraja Market.

== History ==
In princely state of Mysore during British, the Wadeyars ruled under the guidance of Vice-Roy. Of course, Wadeyars had to please the Vice-Roy and other Officers to maintain a cordial relationship. Lord Dufferin was the Viceroy of India during 1884–1888. What is popularly known as Chikkagadiyara seen at the end of Devaraja Market close to Krishna Rajendra Circle was commissioned in his honor. He was the first Viceroy of the colonial India to pay a ceremonial and friendly visit to Mysore on invitation of Maharaja Chamaraja Wadeyar X in 1886. It is named after him as Dufferin Clock Tower. It is now a heritage structure in Mysore and served as time keeper during the reign of the Wadeyars.

Dufferin Clock Tower well known as 'Chikkagadiyara' (Little Clock) is situated at the end of Devaraja Market, near KR Circle. It is comparatively small to Bigger clock (Doddagadiyara) near the Town Hall. It was built in 1886 and ornately embroidered to make attractive in the vicinity. It was neglected for a long time. In the recent years, the Clock Tower was renovated to give an impressive look.

== The structure ==
The clock tower is built on a foundation of eight pillars covered by railings. A decorated fountain at the center is the showpiece of the structure. The local people call the clock tower Chikka Gadiyara or the small clock tower. The clock tower has historic importance of its location in front of the monumental Devaraja Market.

== Renovation 2012 ==
The space around the clock tower was formerly used by hawkers and vehicle parkers. The heritage department vacated the hawkers and emptied the space for development. In 2012, the city council completed the work of renovating the space around the clock tower with tiles and seats for tourists. The space is spacious enough to conduct small gatherings. The work was completed on a project of four million Indian rupees. Nine small fountains and 13 decorated lamps were added to the space. The place is now suitable for conducting small music concerts.

== See also ==
- Devaraj Urs Road, Mysore
