= Devaraja Market =

Market in Mysore in Karnataka, India

Coordinates: 12.3111°N 76.6520°E

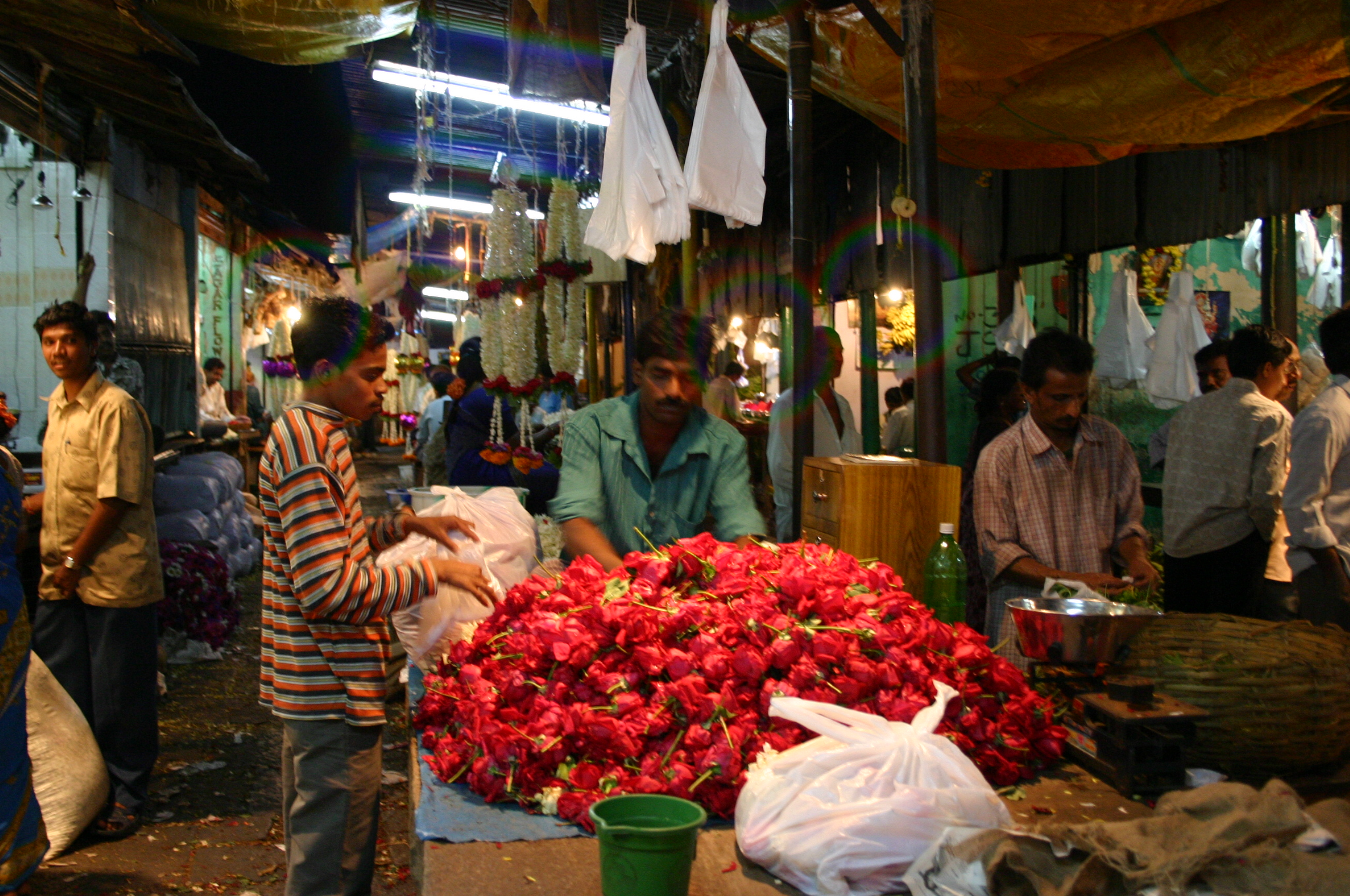
Devaraja Market at night in 2005

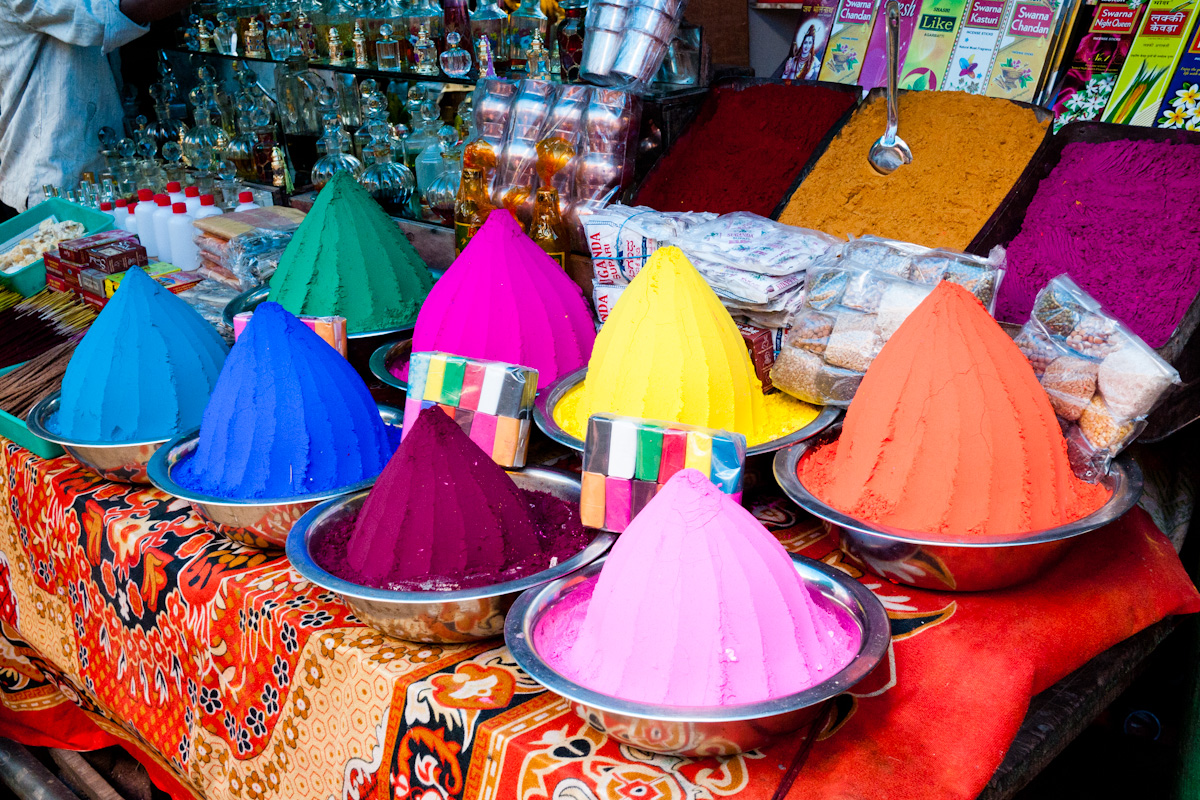
Kumkum powder displayed for sale at the market

Devaraja Market is a market located in Mysuru, India. One can buy flowers, fruits, and choose from conical piles of colorful Kumkum powder. Spices, sandalwood products, silk saris, essential oils, and incense are also available for purchase. The market is on Sayaji Rao Road. In 2017, there were 1,122 shops in the market employing over 3,000 people and receiving 8,000 to 10,000 visitors each day. It is a tourist attraction, and a popular place to take photos.

The market was constructed in 1886. It was initially a weekly market. The market was built above the Dewan Poornaiah Canal that supplied drinking water to Mysore Palace. It was named in 1925 after Dodda Devaraja Wadeyar. It is also known as Dodda market.

Its area spans 3.67 acres. The market is bounded by a structure with wooden rafters and stone masonry walls that faces the street on all four sides. The north gate is on Devantri Road. The market is bounded by Sayaji Rao Road on the east side. The south gate faces Dufferin Clock Tower. Inside the market, there are open areas where vendors can sell their wares. The inner shops are arranged along three aisles that go through the entire market.

Throughout the years, Devaraja Market has also seen fires and other disasters. 150 shops were destroyed by fire in 1981, 195 in 1990, and 30 in 1999. In August 2016, the north entrance gate collapsed due to structural weakness. There have been discussions about demolishing the market due to the state of disrepair.
