= Dewan's Road =

Road in Mysore, India

Coordinates: 12.311191°N 76.646410°E

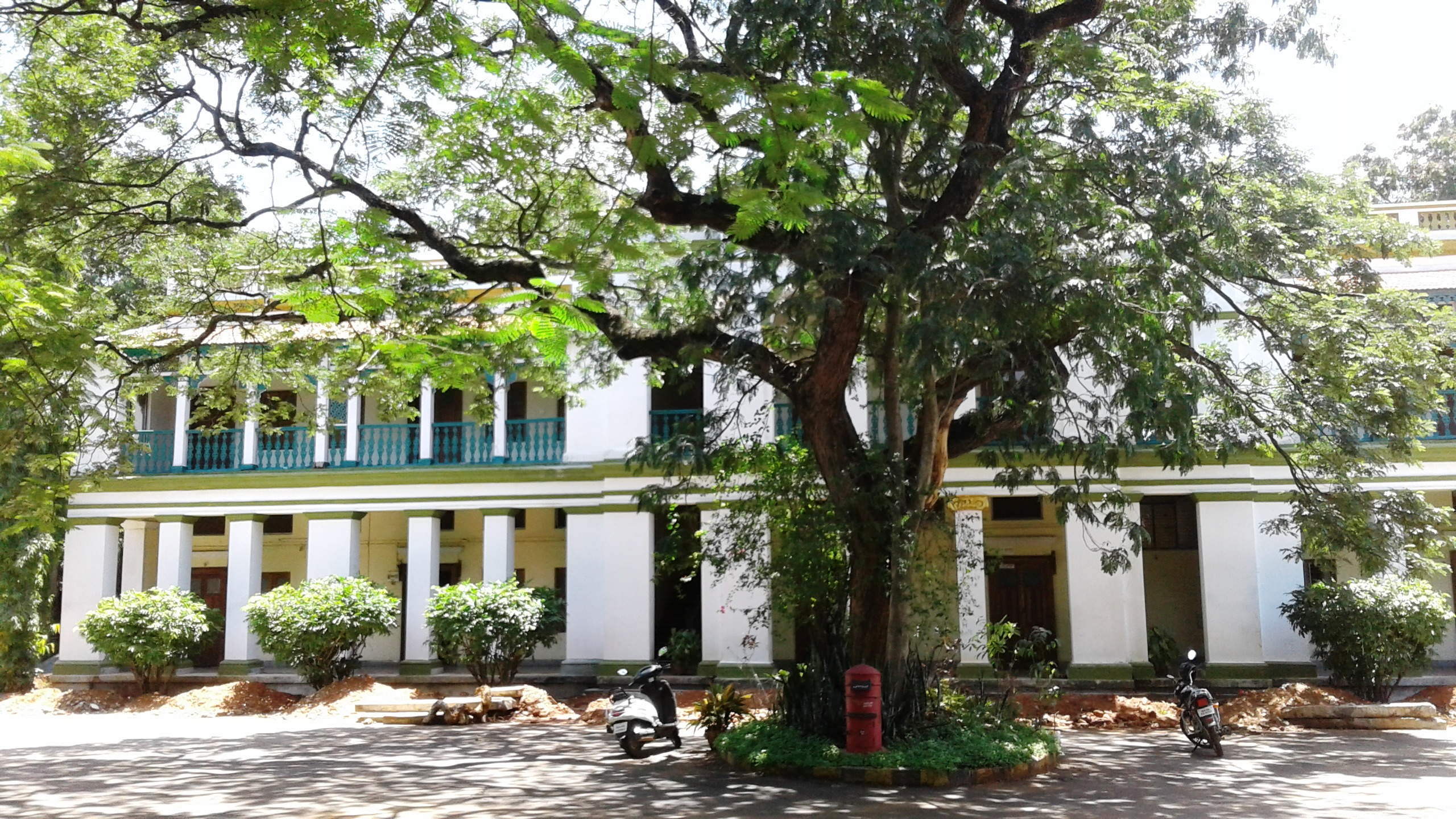
Chamundi Guest House

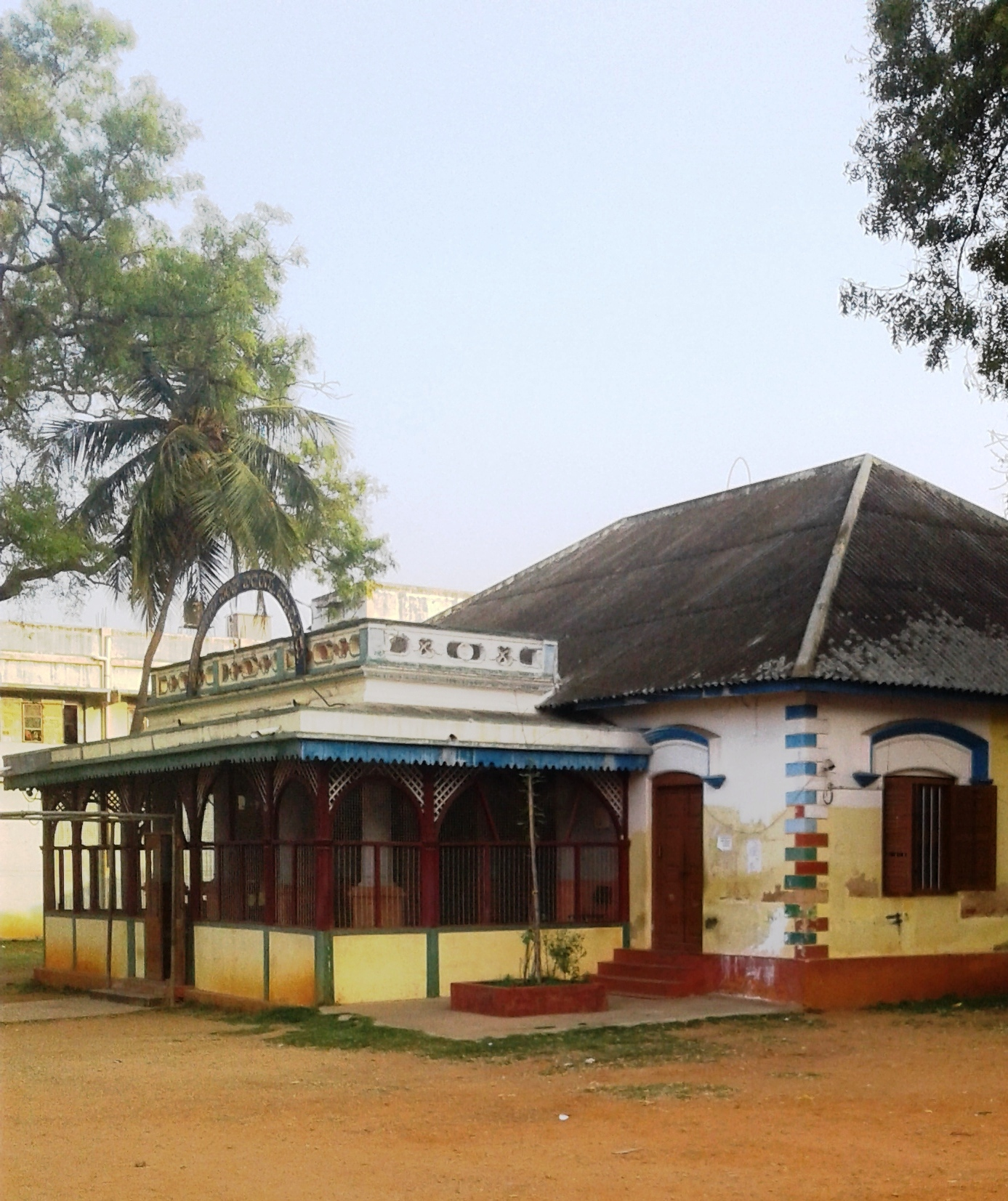
Historic Allamma Choultry

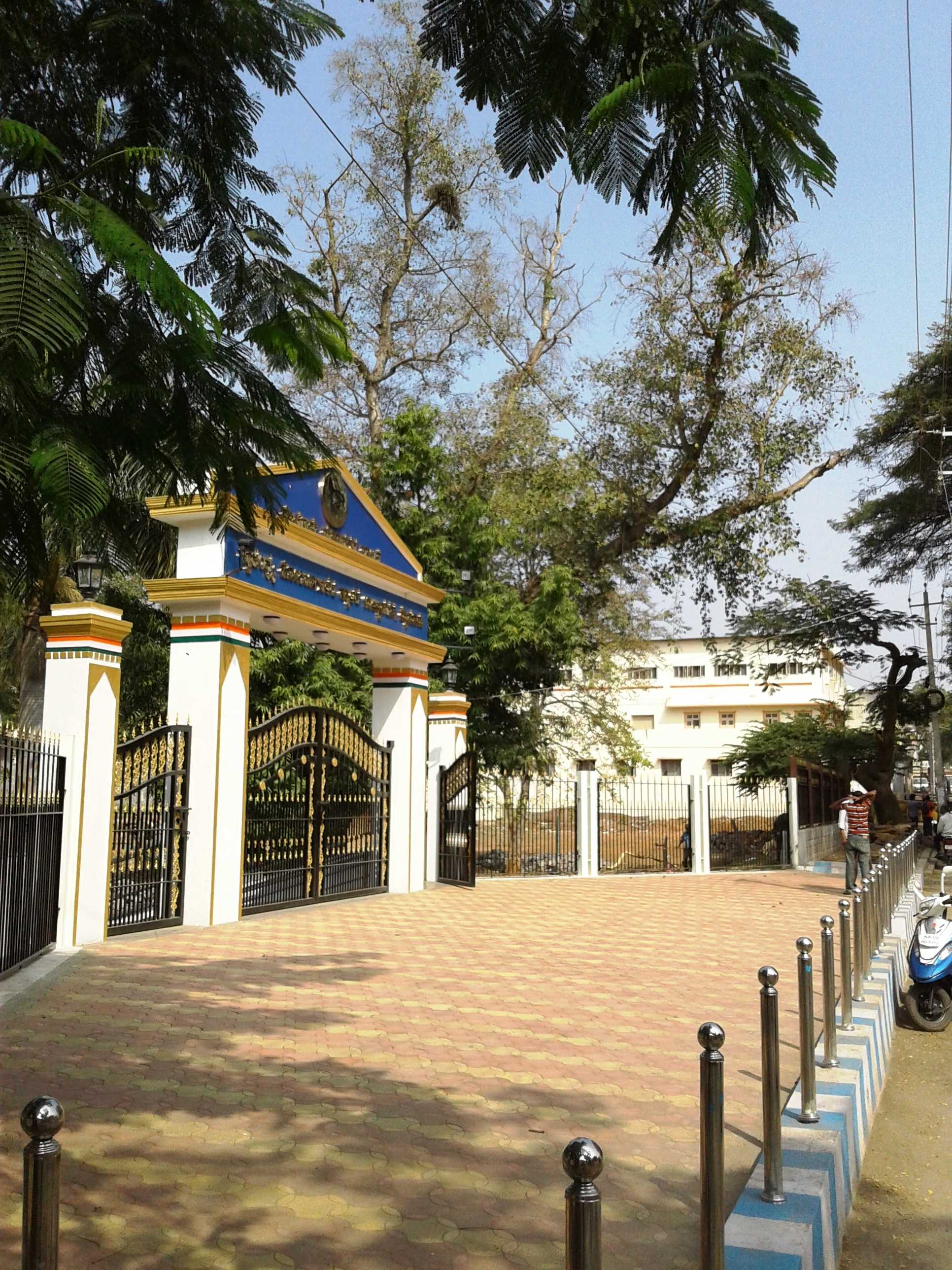
Freedom fighters Park

Dewan's Road, officially known as Seshadri Iyer Road is an important main street in downtown Mysore city, Karnataka state, India.

== Location ==
Dewan's Road is located on the western side of the city center. Other important roads like the Devaraj Urs Road, Vinobha Road and the Chamaraja Double Road connect with it. Dewans Road begins from the back of Cheluvambra Hospital near Sapna Bookstall. It passes the western side of the Freedom fighters Park and terminates near the eastern side of the R.T.O.Circle.

== Important Landmarks ==
- Jain Bhavan
- Lakshmi Hayagreeva Institute
- Freedom fighters Park
- Sushrutha Eye Hospital
- Marimallappa School
- Karnataka Lokayuktha
- Oriental Bank of Commerce

== Length ==
Dewan's Road is about 1.55 kilometers in length. The end of the Dewans Road goes up to RTO circle after landmarks like Remya Mahendra Restaurant, Shubham Dewans Apartments, Tata Car service and Bharath Travels.

== History ==
The origin of the Dewans Road dates back to the time of the king of Mysore. After independence, this historic road was neglected for some and became unhygienic in repair. A makeover was introduced in 2016 with paintings and portraits of eminent persons. Artists from CAVA (Chamarajendra Academy of Visual Arts) contributed to this change. A tower clock is also being made here.

== Post Office ==
The pincode of Dewan's Road is 570001 as it comes under Devaraja Mohalla Post Office.

== See also ==
- Devaraj Urs Road, Mysore

== Image gallery ==
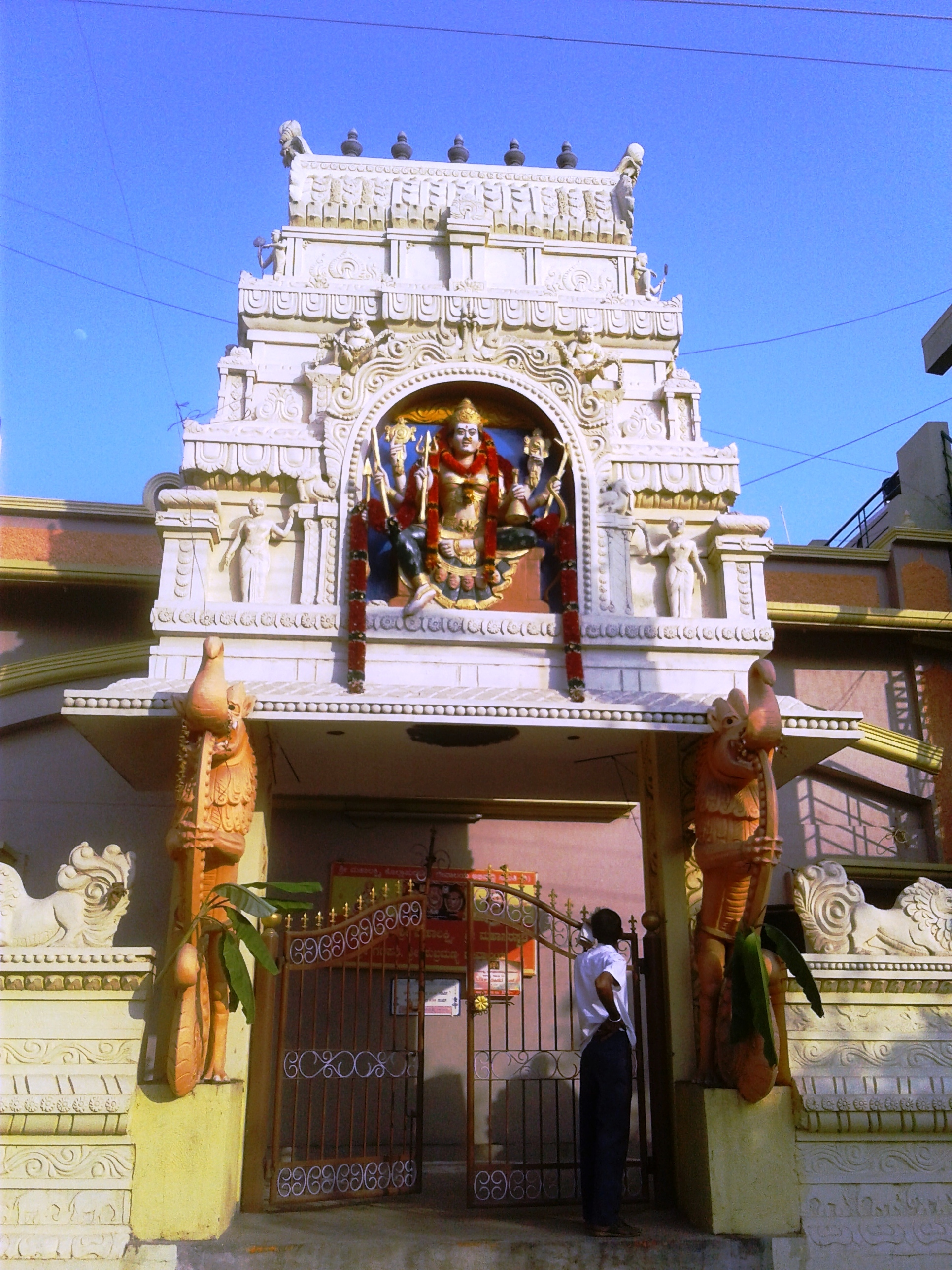
Mahalakshmi Temple

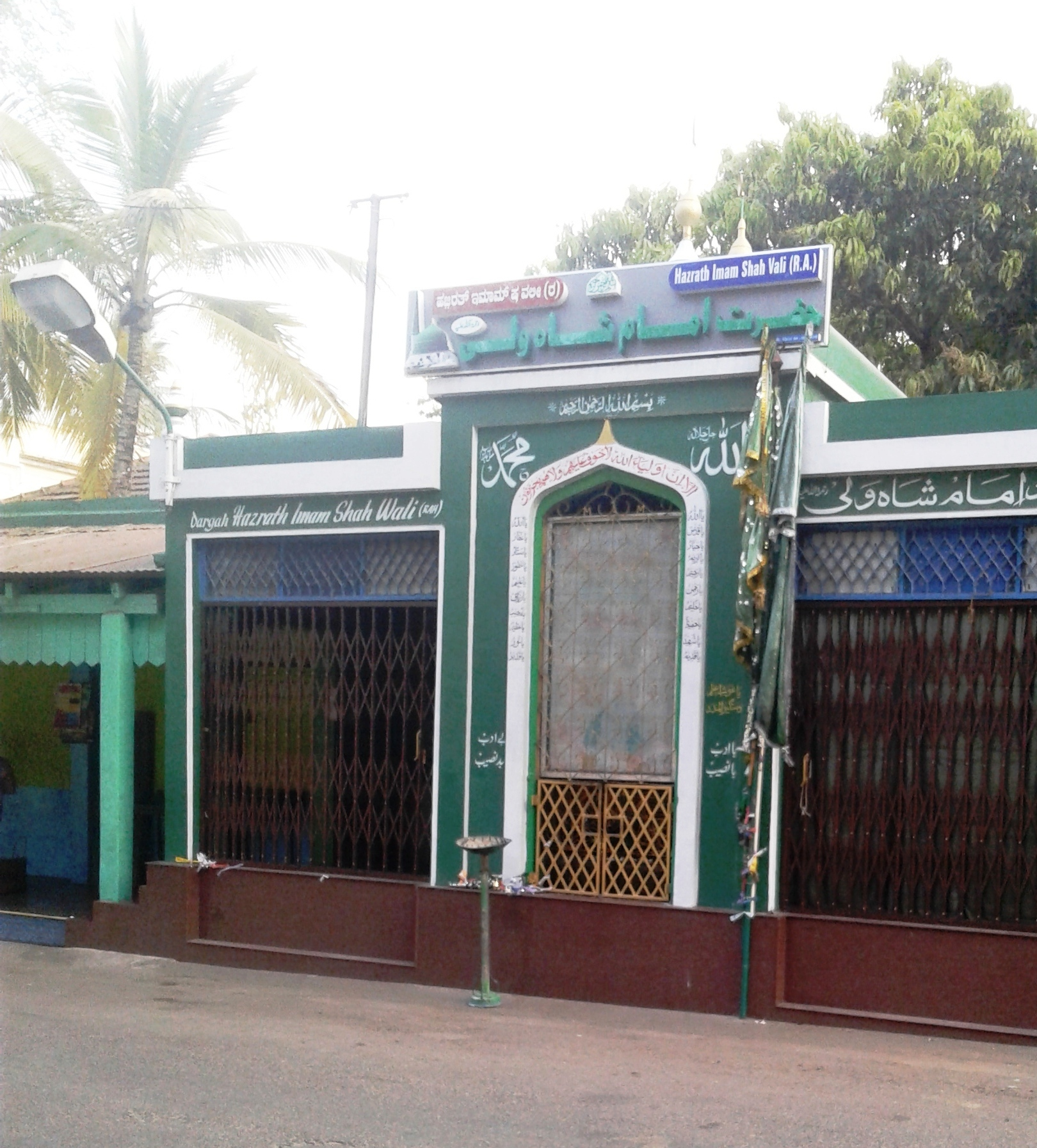
Imam Shah Durgah
