= MPM =

MPM may refer to:

== Biology ==
- MPM (psychedelic), a psychedelic drug
- Malignant Pleural Mesothelioma
- Matrix population models

== Computing and technology ==
- MPM (automobile), an automobile built in Mount Pleasant, Michigan, 1914–1915
- MP/M (Multi-Programming Monitor Control Program), a Digital Research operating system
- Manufacturing process management, to define how products are to be manufactured
- Manufacturing Programming Mode, a configuration mode of the BIOS on some HP computers
- Material point method, a numerical technique to simulate the behavior of solids, liquids, gases
- Microwave Power Module, a microwave device to amplify radio frequency signals
- Request processing modes, a feature of the Apache HTTP Server
- Apache MultiProcessing Modules, part of the Apache HTTP Server architecture

== Education ==
- Master of Project Management, a graduate degree
- Master of Public Management
- Master of Science in Project Management

== Other uses ==
- Maputo International Airport (IATA code: MPM), in Maputo, Mozambique
- Marginal propensity to import
- Measures per minute, a measure of musical tempo
- Metra potential method, a means of describing, organizing, and planning a project
- Mid-Pacific Mountains, an oceanic plateau in the Pacific Ocean
- Milwaukee Public Museum
- Moviment Patrijotti Maltin, a Maltese anti-immigration political party
- Movimiento Peronista Montonero, Argentine guerrilla group the Montoneros
- Mysore Paper Mills, at Bhadravathi in the Shimoga district of Karnataka state, India
