= Metra (disambiguation) =

Metra is a commuter railroad in the Chicago area.

Metra may also refer to:

- Mettā, a Buddhist philosophy
- METRA Transit System, transportation provider in Muscogee County, Georgia, United States
- Metra Theatre, a theatre company in London
- Metra potential method, a project management technique

== People ==
- Cecilia Metra, electrical engineer at the University of Bologna, Italy
- Louis-François Metra (1738–1804), French journalist
- Olivier Métra (1830–1889), French composer and conductor
