= Mysore State Railway =

Railway company in India

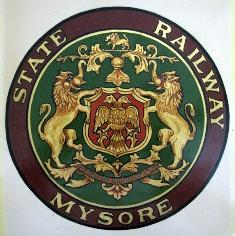
- Industry: Railways
- Founded: 1879
- Defunct: 1951
- Area served: Kingdom of Mysore and Mysore State

Mysore State Railway (MSR) was a railway company which was operated by the government of the Kingdom of Mysore. After India's constitution into a republic, MSR became part of Southern Railways of the government of India on 14 April 1951.

== History ==
In 1879, the Madras Railway Company constructed a railway line from Royapuram in Madras presidency to Bangalore city. At that time, Maharaja Chamaraja Wadiyar X established a separate railway organisation to carry out extension lines from Bangalore to Mysore. This establishment came to be known as Mysore State Railway.

The Mysore-Nanjangud track stretching for 25.51km was opened for traffic in 1891. The 60.74km Birur-Shimoga line was opened for traffic in 1899. Another important line was Yeshvantpur to Hindupur which was opened for traffic in 1892-93. In 1911-12, the Government of Mysore decided the formation of the State Railway Construction Department and it was put under the control of Sir E.A.S. Bell, the chief engineer. The Shimoga-Talaguppa section was laid in 1930. In 1951, it merged with Madras and Southern Mahratta Railway to form the Southern Railway.

Mysore State Railway started laying the Shivamogga–Talaguppa 1,000 mm (3 ft 3 3/8 in) line in the year 1930 to provide access to Jog Falls. Another purpose was to transport wooden logs from the forests of the Malnad region to make wooden sleepers and also to be used as a fuel in the furnaces of the Mysore Iron Works at Bhadravathi. In 1938, Sir Mirza Ismail took the maiden journey on this line to visit Sagara city. The final section of the line from Sagara to Talaguppa was inaugurated on 9 November 1940.

Some of the prominent people who have used this line to visit Jog Falls include Maharaja Krishnaraja Wadiyar IV, Maharaja Jayachamarajendra Wadiyar, Sir M. Visvesvaraya, Lal Bahadur Shastri, and Morarji Desai. Socialist leader, Ram Manohar Lohia travelled in a train on this line to participate in the Kagodu Satyagraha but was arrested at Sagara station.

In 1990s, the train on the Shivamogga-Talaguppa line was replaced by a railcar. The railcar could accommodate 52 passengers and took 3:45 hours to cover the distance of 82km, a journey which took considerably lesser time to cover by road. It was one of the few trains with conductors on board and tickets could be bought on the train itself, whereas the normal practice followed in Indian Railways, was that passengers should buy tickets before boarding a train. Once the railcar reached Talaguppa, the rail car had to be reversed using a turntable, so that it could start its return journey.

== Rolling stock ==
In 1936, the company owned 39 locomotives, 216 coaches and 754 goods wagons.

== Classification ==
It was labeled as a Class II railway according to Indian Railway Classification System of 1926. Later, it was classified as Class I.

== Conversion to broad gauge ==
The Bangalore-Shimoga line was converted to 1,676 mm (5 ft 6 in) broad gauge starting from late 1990s to early 2000s. Finally, the Shimoga-Talaguppa line was converted to 1,676 mm (5 ft 6 in) broad gauge in 2007.
