= Arebilachi =

- village
- Country: India
- State: Karnataka
- District: Shimoga
- Talukas: Bhadravati

Population (2001)
  - Total: 5,502

Languages
  - Official: Kannada
- Time zone: UTC+5:30 (IST)

Arebilachi is a village in the southern state of Karnataka, India. It is located in the Bhadravati taluk of Shimoga district in Karnataka.The village has a PHC (Primary Health care ) which is one of the largest in the state covering for a population of 20,000 people of all surrounding villages.

== Demographics ==
As of 2001 India census, Arebilachi had a population of 5502 with 2816 males and 2686 females.

== See also ==
- Shimoga
- Districts of Karnataka
