= M. Visvesvaraya =

Indian civil engineer, administrator, and former prime minister of Mysore Kingdom

Sir Mokshagundam Visvesvaraya KCIE, FASc
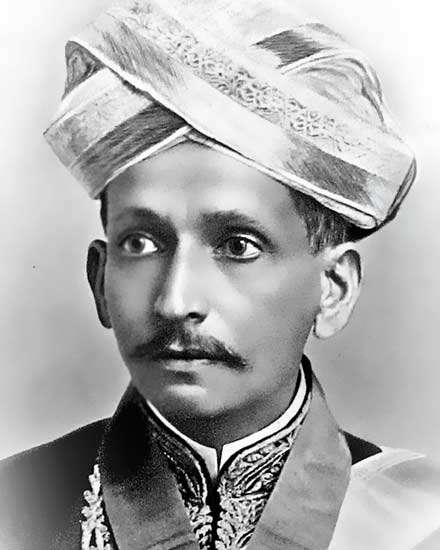
- Visvesvaraya in his 40s

19th Dewan of Mysore
- In office 1912–1918
- Monarch: Krishna Raja Wadiyar IV
- Preceded by: T. Ananda Rao
- Succeeded by: M. Kantaraj Urs

Personal details
- Born: Mokshagundam Visvesvaraya; 15 September 1861 Muddenahalli, Kingdom of Mysore, British India
- Died: 12/14 April 1962 (aged 100) Bangalore, Mysore State, India (present-day Karnataka, India)
- Education: Central College, Bangalore; College of Engineering, Pune; University of Madras; University of Bombay
- Profession: Civil engineer and statesman
- Awards: Bharat Ratna (1955)

Sir Mokshagundam Visvesvaraya (Telugu: [moːkʂaguɳɖam ʋisʰʋeːsʰʋaɾajja], 15 September 1861 – 12/14 April 1962), also referred to by his initials, MV, was an Indian civil engineer, administrator, and statesman, who served as the 19th Dewan of Mysore from 1912 to 1918.

Visvesvaraya is regarded in India as one of the foremost civil engineers whose birthday, 15 September, is celebrated every year as Engineer's Day in India, Sri Lanka, and Tanzania. He is also often regarded as "the maker of modern Mysore". According to Prajavani, a Kannada language newspaper, he is also the most popular figure in the southern Indian state of Karnataka.

Visvesvaraya worked as a civil engineer for the government of British India and later as Prime Minister of the Kingdom of Mysore. For his services to British India, he was appointed CIE and later knighted KCIE. For his services to the Kingdom of Mysore and the Republic of India, he was awarded the Bharata Ratna by Government of India in 1955.

== Early life ==
M. Visvesvaraya was born on 15 September 1861 at Muddenahalli, Kingdom of Mysore (in present-day Chikkaballapura district, Karnataka) into a Telugu speaking family of Mokshagundam Srinivasa Shastry and Venkatalakshmi. His ancestors hail from Mokshagundam, a village in present-day Prakasam district of Andhra Pradesh, and had migrated to the kingdom years prior to Visvesvaraya's birth.

Visvesvaraya received his primary education in Bangalore and earned a Bachelor of Science (BSc) degree from the University of Madras. He later studied at the College of Engineering, Pune (then College of Science at the University of Bombay) and graduated as an engineer, receiving Diploma in Civil Engineering (DCE). It was here that he helped found and become a member of the Deccan Club and was its first secretary; he was well-acquainted with the progressives in Pune, including Sir R. G. Bhandarkar, Gopal Krishna Gokhale, and Justice Mahadev Govind Ranade, who were instrumental in starting the club and were its members.

== Career ==
Visvesvaraya began his career by working for the Government of British India, working in Bombay Presidency and other British-held colonies in the Middle East. He later worked for Hyderabad State. After retirement, he began his administrative and statesmanship career and continued his engineering career in the Kingdom of Mysore.

=== Engineering career ===
Visvesvaraya became an assistant engineer in 1885 at the Public Works Department, Bombay, in Bombay Presidency.

In 1899, Visvesvaraya was invited to join the Indian Irrigation Commission where he implemented an intricate system of irrigation in the Deccan Plateau and designed and patented a system of automatic weir water floodgates that were first installed in 1903 at Khadakvasla Dam near Pune. These gates raised the storage level in the reservoir to the highest level likely to be attained without causing any damage to the dam. Based on the success of these gates, the same system was installed at Tigra Dam in Gwalior and later at the KRS Dam at Mysore, Karnataka. He later became the chief engineer of the Laxmi Talav Dam near Kolhapur.

In around 1906/1907, the Government of British India sent Visvesvaraya to the British Colony of Aden (present-day Yemen), to study water supply and drainage systems. The project prepared by him was successfully implemented in Aden.

After opting for voluntary retirement in 1908, Visvesvaraya took a foreign tour to study industrialised nations. Then, for a short period, he worked for Nizam Osman Ali Khan. He was one of the chief engineers of the flood protection system for the city of Hyderabad who suggested flood relief measures for the city, which was under constant threat by the Musi river. He achieved celebrity status when he designed a flood protection system for the city. He was instrumental in developing a system to protect Visakhapatnam port from sea erosion. This dam created the biggest reservoir in Asia at the time of its construction.

In November 1909, at the invitation of Dewan V.P. Madhava Rao, Visvesvaraya joined as a chief engineer of Mysore State. He was the Chief Engineer of the KRS Dam at Mysore. He was also later the chairman of the board of engineers for the Tungabhadra Dam in Hospet, Karnataka.

=== Premiership ===
In 1912, Visvesvaraya was appointed Dewan of Mysore by Maharaja Krishnaraja Wadiyar IV. He served for nearly seven years until 1918. With support from the maharaja, Visvesvaraya contributed to the general development of the Kingdom of Mysore.

During his premiership as Dewan, Visvesvaraya was responsible for the founding of factories and institutions funded for by the maharaja, including Mysore Soap Factory, Parasitoid Laboratory, Mysore Iron & Steel Works in Bhadravathi, Bangalore Polytechnic (now Sri Jayachamarajendra Polytechnic Bangalore), Bangalore Agricultural University, State Bank of Mysore, Century Club, Mysore Chamber of Commerce (now Federation of Karnataka Chambers of Commerce & Industry), Mysore Apex Chamber of Commerce (now Apex Chamber of Karnataka), and numerous other industrial places.The Bangalore Press was also established during his tenure as Dewan. He was also instrumental in the founding of Government Engineering College (now University Visvesvaraya College of Engineering) at Bangalore in 1917, one of the first engineering institutes in India. He commissioned several new railway lines in Mysore Railways (now part of Southwestern Indian Railways).

Visvesvaraya encouraged private investment in industry during his tenure as Dewan. He was instrumental in charting out a plan for road construction between Tirumala and Tirupati.

Visvesvaraya gave his technical advice for the location of Mokama Bridge over the Ganga in Bihar. At the time, he was over 90 years old.

=== Career timeline ===
- Assistant Engineer in Bombay, 1885; served in Nasik, Khandesh (mainly in Dhule) and Pune
- Services lent to Municipality of Sukkur, Sind, 1894; designed and carried out waterworks for the municipality
- Executive Engineer, Surat, 1896
- Assistant Superintending Engineer, Pune, 1897–1899; visited China and Japan, 1898
- Executive Engineer for Irrigation, Pune, 1899
- Sanitary Engineer, Bombay, and member, Sanitary Board, 1901; gave evidence before Indian Irrigation Commission
- Designed and constructed automatic gates patented by him at Lake Fife Storage Reservoir; introduced a new system of irrigation known as "Block System", 1903; represented the Bombay Government at Simla Irrigation Commission, 1904; on special duty, 1905
- Superintending Engineer, 1907; visited Egypt, Canada, United States, and Russia, 1908
- Consulting Engineer to Hyderabad/Nizam State supervised and carried out engineering works on Musi river; Hyderabad floods of 1909
- Retired from British Service, 1909
- Chief Engineer and Secretary to Government of Mysore, 1909
- Dewan of Mysore, Public Works Department and Railway, 1913
- Board of Directors of Tata Steel, 1927–1955

== Awards and honours ==
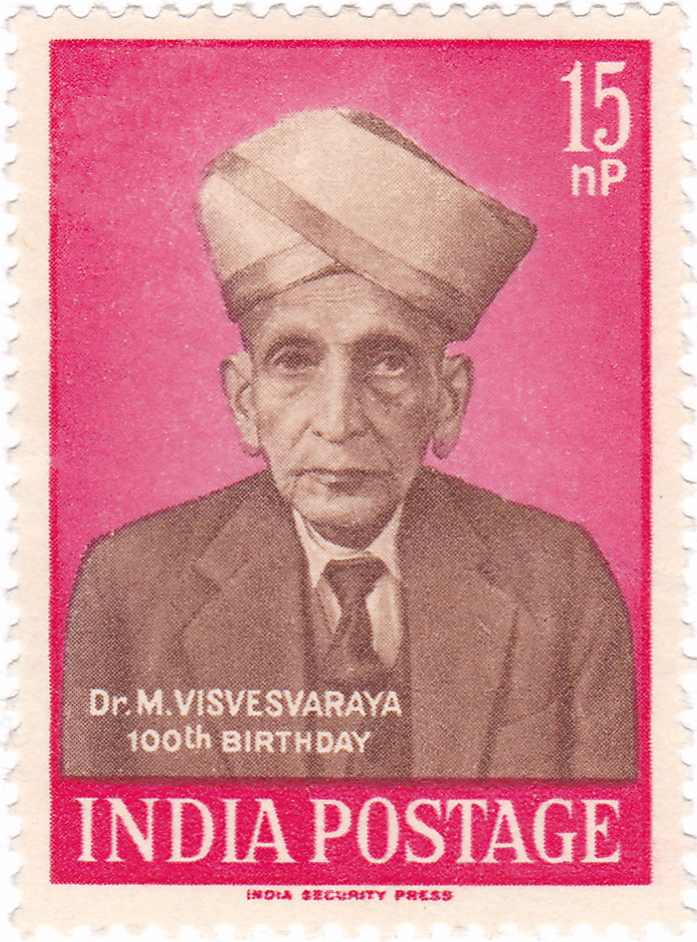
Visvesvaraya on a 1960 stamp of India

Visvesvaraya was appointed a Companion of the Order of the Indian Empire (CIE) in 1911 by King Edward VII, when he was the Chief Engineer to the Government of Mysore. In 1915, while he was Dewan of Mysore, Visvesvaraya was knighted as a Knight Commander of the Order of the Indian Empire (KCIE) by King George V for his contributions to the public good.

After India attained independence, Visvesvaraya received the Bharat Ratna, India's highest civilian honour, in 1955. He received an honorary membership from the Institution of Civil Engineers, London, a fellowship from the Indian Institute of Science, Bangalore, and several honorary degrees including D.Sc., LL.D., D.Litt. from eight universities in India. He was the president of the 1923 session of the Indian Science Congress.

=== Recognition ===
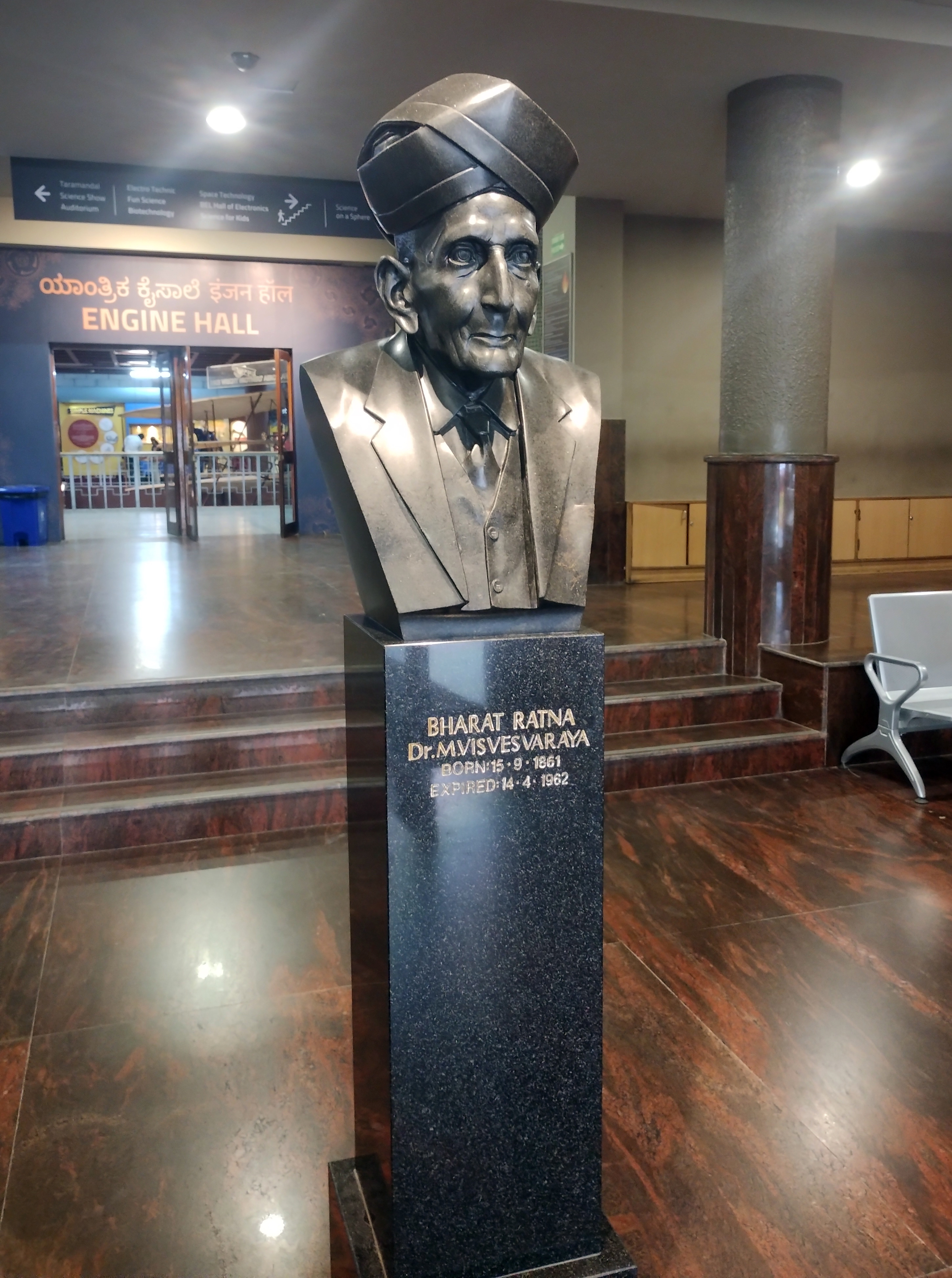
Bust of M. Visvesvaraya in Visvesvaraya Industrial and Technological Museum, Bangalore

Visvesvaraya received recognition in many fields, most notably education and engineering. Visvesvaraya Technological University in Belagavi (to which most engineering colleges in Karnataka are affiliated) was named in his honour, as well as prominent colleges like University Visvesvaraya College of Engineering, Bangalore; Sir M. Visvesvaraya Institute of Technology, Bangalore; and Visvesvaraya National Institute of Technology, Nagpur; Visvesvaraya Hostel, IIT (BHU) Varanasi; Visvesvaraya Industrial and Technological Museum, Bangalore.

The College of Engineering, Pune, his alma mater, erected a statue in Visvesvaraya's honour. Two metro stations in India, one in Bangalore on the Purple Line (Sir M. Visveshwaraya Station, Central College), and another one in Delhi on the Pink Line (Sir Vishweshwaraiah Moti Bagh), are named after him. The railway terminal in Baiyyapanahalli at Bangalore is named Sir M. Visvesvaraya Terminal after him.

On 15 September 2018, to celebrate his 157th birth anniversary, Sir Visvesvaraya was honored with a Google Doodle.

== Death ==
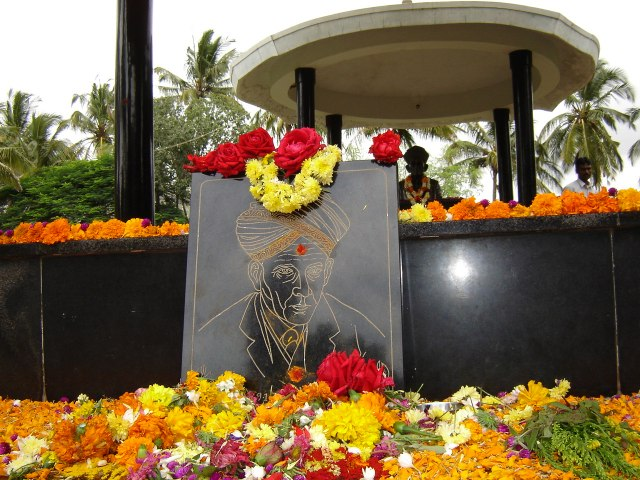
The Samadhi of Visvesvaraya at Muddenahalli

Visvesvaraya died on 12/14 April 1962, aged 100.

Visvesvaraya was known for his sincerity, time management and dedication to his cause. Visvesvaraya was a strict lacto-vegetarian who never ate meat or eggs. He was also a non-smoker and a teetotaller.

A very important part of Visvesvaraya's nature was his love for Kannada language. He set up Kannada Parishat for the improvement of Kannada. He wanted seminars for Kannada supporters to be instituted and conducted right in Kannada.

=== Memorial at Muddenahalli ===
Visvesvaraya National Memorial Trust manages a memorial for Visvesvaraya at his birthplace of Muddenahalli. The memorial exhibits his awards, titles and personal belongings, including his living room, spectacles, cups, books and block with which his visiting cards were printed. Models of the Krishna Raja Sagar Dam, which Visvesvaraya designed and supervised the construction of, are exhibited. The memorial is adjacent to his house, which was refurbished and is regarded as a shrine by locals.

== Works ==
- Visvesvaraya, M (1920), Reconstructing India, P. S. King & son, ltd, OCLC 2430680
- Visvesvaraya, M (1936), Planned economy for India, Bangalore: Bangalore Press, OCLC 19373044
- Visvesvaraya, M (1951), Memories of my working life, Bangalore, OCLC 6459729
- Visvesvaraya, Mokshagundam (1932), Unemployment in India; its causes and cure, Bangalore: The Bangalore Press, OCLC 14348788
- Visvesvaraya, Mokshagundam (1917), Speeches, Bangalore: Govt. Press, OCLC 6258388

Political offices
Preceded by T. Ananda Rao	Diwan of Mysore (1912–1919)	Succeeded by M. Kantaraj Urs
