= Bannihatti Parameshwarappa Dakshayani =

Indian cientist

BP Dakshayani
- Bannihatti Parameshwarappa
- Education: University of Mysore
- Known for: Mars Orbiter Mission
- Scientific career
- Workplaces: Indian Space Research Organisation Satellite Centre; Sir Vishveshwaraiah Institute of Science & Technology

Bannihatti (BP) Parameshwarappa Dakshayani is the former group director of the Flight Dynamics and Space Navigation groups of the Indian Space Research Organisation Satellite Centre.

== Early life and education ==
Dakshayani was born and raised in Bhadravati, Karnataka. She was encouraged to study engineering by her father, but he thought a bachelor's degree would be sufficient. She studied mathematics at the University of Mysore and earned a master's degree in 1981. After graduating she worked at Sir Vishveshwaraiah Institute of Science & Technology teaching maths. In 1998 she completed a Masters in Aerospace Engineering at the Indian Institute of Science.

== Career ==
Dakshayani was appointed to the Indian Space Research Organisation Satellite Centre in 1984. She was assigned to computer programming and orbital dynamics. She had never seen a computer when she applied, so had to teach herself during the evenings. The software she designed for trajectory generation was used in several space missions.

She was made director for the Flight Dynamics and Space Navigation groups. Around 27% of the staff involved with the development and design of satellites were women. She was responsible for the low earth, geosynchronous orbit and interplanetary missions of the Indian Space Research Organisation Satellite Centre. She was project manager for the Space Capsule Recovery Experiment and deputy project manager for the Mars Orbiter Mission. After completing an analysis of orbit stability, she identified that a highly eccentric orbit would provide better position accuracy. She won an Indian Space Research Organisation Satellite Centre merit award for her Mars Orbiter Mission. The mission entered the desired Martian orbit in September 2014. In 2018 she appeared on the BBC World Service show My Indian Life with Kalki Koechlin.
