= Mysore Paper Mills =

Indian company

Mysore Paper Mill Limited
- Type: Government
- Traded as: BSE: 502405
- Industry: Paper mill and Co-generation
- Headquarters: Bhadravathi, Karnataka, India
- Key people: Araga Jnanendra (Chairman)
- Operating income: ▼₹54.90 crore (US$5.7 million) (2011–12)
- Net income: ▼₹84.78 crore (US$8.8 million) (2011–12)
- Owner: Government of India
- Website: www.mpm.co.in

Mysore Paper Mill Limited or the MPM is situated at Bhadravathi in the Shimoga district of Karnataka state, India. It was established in the year 1936 by Nalvadi Krishnaraja Wodeyar, the then Maharaja of Mysore state. In 1977, the company became a government company. The company obtained ISO certification in the year 2004.

== Closure ==
MPM closed its functioning in 2016. Government wants to privatise the company while workers want the government to revive it. Some workers opted for voluntary retirement scheme. Company has issued tenders for disposal of materials

== See also ==
- VISL
- Shimoga
