= Three Sisters (play) =

1901 play by Anton Chekhov

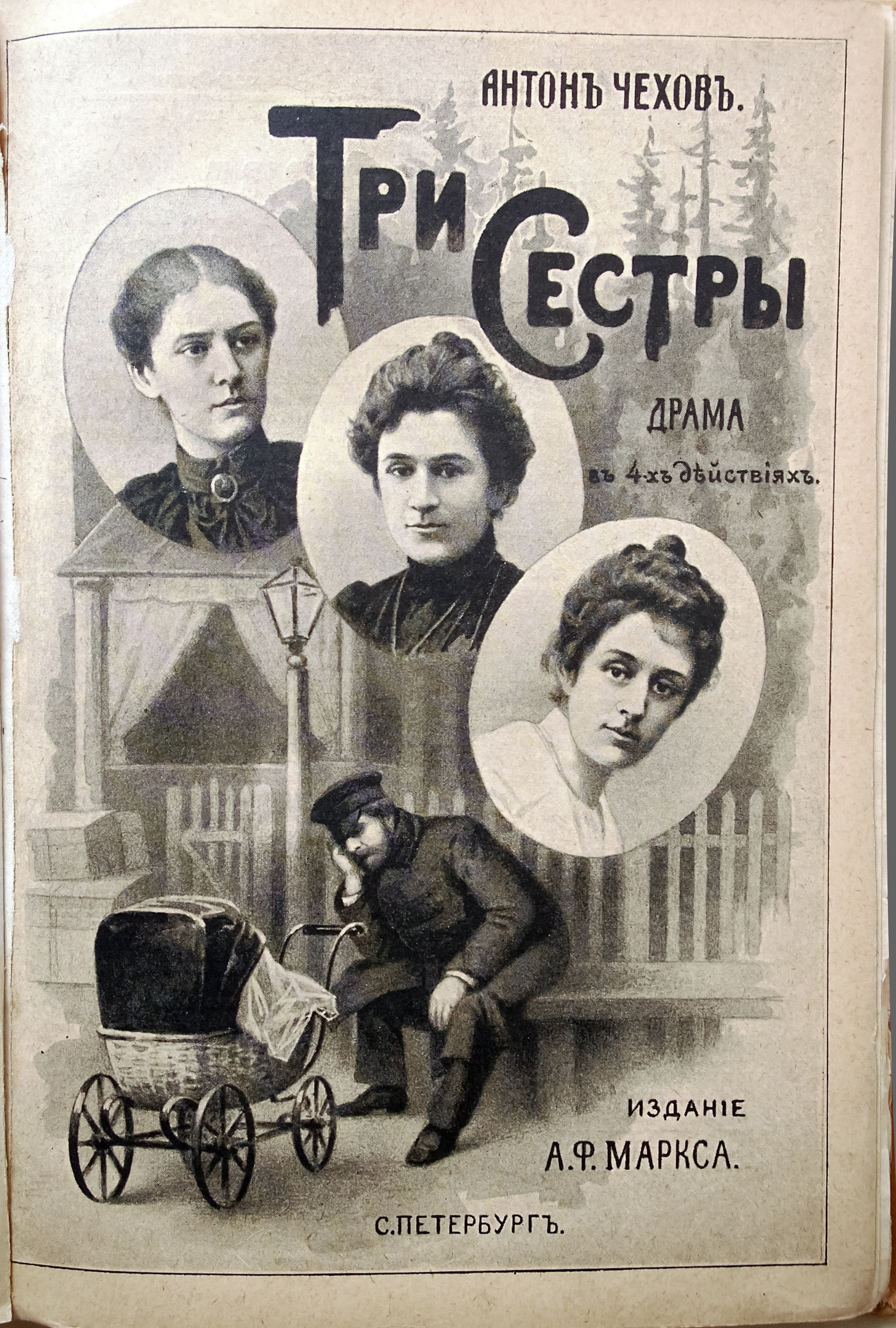
- Cover of first edition, published 1901 by Adolf Marks
- Original title: Три сeстры́
- Original language: Russian
- Written by: Anton Chekhov
- Characters: Prozorov family: Olga Sergeyevna Prozorova; Maria Sergeyevna Kulygina; Irina Sergeyevna Prozorova; Andrei Sergeyevich Prozorov
- Genre: Tragicomedy, drama
- Setting: A provincial Russian garrison town

Premiere
- Date: 1901
- Place: Moscow Art Theatre

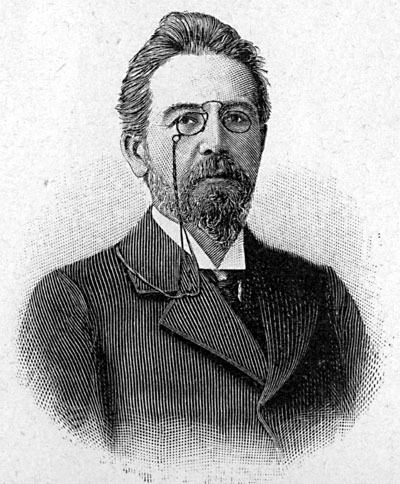
Chekhov in a 1905 illustration.

Three Sisters (Russian: Три сeстры́, romanized: Tri sestry) is a play by the Russian author and playwright Anton Chekhov. It was written in 1900 and first performed in 1901 at the Moscow Art Theatre. The play is often included on the shortlist of Chekhov's outstanding plays, along with The Cherry Orchard, The Seagull and Uncle Vanya.

== Characters ==
=== The Prozorovs ===
- Olga Sergeyevna Prozorova (Olga) – The eldest of the three sisters, she is the matriarchal figure of the Prozorov family, though at the beginning of the play she is only 28 years old. Olga is a schoolmistress at the high school, where she frequently fills in for the headmistress whenever the latter is absent. Olga is a spinster and at one point tells Irina that she would have married "any man, even an old man if he had asked" her. Olga is very motherly even to the elderly servants, keeping on the elderly nurse/retainer Anfisa, long after she has ceased to be useful. When Olga reluctantly takes the role of headmistress permanently, she takes Anfisa with her to escape the clutches of the heartless Natasha.
- Maria Sergeyevna Kulygina (Masha) – The middle sister, she is 23 at the beginning of the play. She married her husband, Kulygin, when she was 18 and just out of school. When the play opens she has been disappointed in the marriage and falls completely in love with the idealistic Lieutenant-Colonel Vershinin. They begin a clandestine affair. When he is transferred away, she is crushed, but returns to life with her husband, who accepts her back despite knowing what she has done. She has a short temper, which is seen frequently throughout the play, and is the sister who disapproves the most of Natasha. Onstage, her directness often serves as a tonic to the melodrama, and her ironic wit comes across as heroic. She provides much of the humour. She was trained as a concert pianist.
- Irina Sergeyevna Prozorova (Irina) – The youngest sister, she is 20 at the beginning of the play. It is her "name day" at the beginning of the play and though she insists she is grown-up she is still enchanted by things such as a spinning top brought to her by Fedotik. Her only desire is to go back to Moscow, which they left eleven years before the play begins. She believes she will find her true love in Moscow, but when it becomes clear that they are not going to Moscow, she agrees to marry the Baron Tuzenbach, whom she admires but does not love. She gets her teaching degree and plans to leave with the Baron, but he is shot and killed by the psychopath Solyony in a pointless duel. She decides to leave anyway and dedicate her life to work and service.
- Andrei Sergeyevich Prozorov (Andrei) – The brother of the three sisters. In Act I, he is a young man on the fast track to becoming a faculty professor in Moscow. However, his inertia, weak-willed indecisiveness, and poor judgment (all of which will become apparent throughout the play) put paid to those dreams. In Act II, he still longs for his old days as a bachelor dreaming of life in Moscow, but is now, due to his fatefully ill-conceived wedding to Natasha, stuck in a provincial town with a baby and a job as secretary to the County Council. In Act III, his debts have grown to 35,000 rubles and he is forced to mortgage the house, but does not tell his sisters or give them any shares in the family home. Act IV finds Andrei a pathetic shell of his former self, now the father of two (although he may not be the biological father of the younger child). He acknowledges he is a failure and laughed at in town for being a member of the village council whose president, Protopopov (never seen onstage), is cuckolding him.
- Natalia Ivanovna Prozorov (Natasha) – Andrei's love interest, later his wife. She begins the play as an awkward young woman who dresses poorly and is ridiculed and teased by Andrei's sisters. Much fun is made of her ill-becoming green sash and she bursts into tears. She apparently has no family of her own, although not known to be an orphan (a signal that she cares for no one but herself) and the reader never learns her maiden name. She agrees to marry Andrei despite seemingly being surprised by the proposal. Act II finds a very different Natasha. She has grown bossy and flagrantly carries on an affair with Protopopov, the president of the council on which her husband sits bureaucratic superior, and who may well be the biological father of her younger child, especially since she has bustled Andrei out of their bedroom into more modest quarters. In Act III, she has become even more controlling. She is determined, among other things, to expel the sisters' now elderly former family retainer, Anfisa, who is no longer fit for hard work, and still throws temper tantrums whenever she doesn't get her way, an increasingly rare event. Act IV finds that she has control of the house, and, as the châtelaine, is planning to radically change the grounds to her liking. Inarguably, she is the victor by the end of the play — caring for no one besides her own children, Bobik and Sofia, upon whom she dotes. The only woman in the play with children, she rules the Prozorov's now mortgaged (to pay for her husband's debts and her expensive tastes) former family home with an iron fist. She orders the sisters' beloved trees in the garden to be cut down because she thinks them ugly.
- Fyodor Ilyich Kulygin – Masha's older husband and the Latin teacher at the high school. Kulygin is a cheerful man, extremely learned but often unaware of the emotions of the people around him. In the first act he seems almost foolish, but begins to grow more and more sympathetic as Masha's affair with Vershinin progresses. Even as Kulygin becomes aware of Masha's infidelity, he continues to make gestures of affection towards her, and never confronts or condemns her. He does, however, consider it improper for her to play the piano in public. During the fire in Act 3, he confesses to Olga that he might have married her instead; the idea that the two might have been happier together is hinted at many times during the play. Throughout the play, even at the most serious moments, he tries to make the other characters laugh with abstruse academic humour that often falls flat. Despite this, he is able to give his wife comfort through humour in her darkest hour when she loses her lover. At the end of the play, knowing what Masha has done, he asks her to come back to him and promises not to say a word about what has passed.

=== The soldiers ===
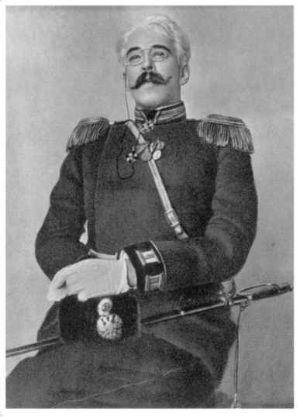
Konstantin Stanislavski as Vershinin

- Aleksandr Ignatyevich Vershinin – Lieutenant colonel commanding the artillery battery, Vershinin is a true philosopher. He knew the sisters' father in Moscow; when they were little they called him the "Lovesick Major". He married the woman he was lovesick for, but the marriage has become unhappy. His wife regularly attempts suicide, but he does not change his behaviour. In the course of the play, he enters into an affair with Masha which only ends when his company is transferred out. His first act speech about the hope he has for civilization speaks directly to Masha's melancholic heart, and, upon hearing it, she declares "I'm staying for lunch."
- Baron Nikolaj Lvovich Tuzenbach – A lieutenant in the army and not deemed handsome, Tuzenbach often tries to impress Irina, whom he has loved for five years. He quits the Army to go to work in an attempt to impress her. When Irina finally agrees to marry him, Tuzenbach becomes the object of Solyony's murderous jealousy. Solyony taunts him to provoke him, and between Acts III and IV, he retaliates and challenges Solyony to a duel. He is killed in the duel on the day before he was to marry Irina.
- Staff Captain Vassily Vasilyevich Solyony – A captain in the army and an experienced duellist, Solyony is a social misfit, prone to sudden outbursts of rage, mockery, misogyny and vulgarity. He spends much of his time mocking Tuzenbach, who is the closest thing he has to a friend. Solyony becomes infatuated with Irina and awkwardly declares his feelings to her, but becomes angry and sexually aggressive when Irina rejects him. He swears to kill anyone who gets close to her, and in the final act he fulfills this promise by provoking Tuzenbach into a duel and shooting him. Solyony claims to have a remarkable resemblance to the poet Lermontov in both face and personality, often quoting him, although Lermontov was killed in a duel by refusing to fire at his opponent, Nikolai Martynov, who aimed at Lermontov's heart. Thus, Solyony turns out to be the polar opposite of Lermontov in actual character and closer to Martynov. He always carries a small perfume bottle which he frequently (almost pathologically) sprinkles his hands and body with; it is later revealed that he does it to mask the smell of corpses on him.
- Ivan Romanovich Chebutykin – Sixty years old and an army doctor, Chebutykin starts off as a fun, eccentric old man who exults in his place as family friend and lavishes upon Irina the expensive but inappropriate gift of a samovar. Later on in Act III, while drunk, he suffers an existential crisis and loudly reveals to all Natasha's and Protopopov's affair. In Act IV however, he seems to have come to terms with his crisis or perhaps been broken by it. He was in love, apparently unrequitedly, with the Prozorov siblings' mother, a married woman.
- Alexei Petrovich Fedotik – A sub-lieutenant, Fedotik hangs around the house buying many gifts for the family. He also is an amateur photographer, and takes photos of the group. In Act III, he loses all his belongings in the fire, but retains his cheerful nature.
- Vladimir Karlovich Rode – Another sub-lieutenant, Rode is a drill coach at the high school.

=== Others ===
- Ferapont – Door-keeper at the local council offices, Ferapont is an old man with a partial hearing loss. He repeatedly blurts out random facts, usually relating to Moscow.
- Anfisa – An elderly family retainer and former nurse, Anfisa is 81 years old and has worked forever for the Prozorov family. Natasha begins to despise her for her feebleness and threatens to throw her out but Olga rescues her, taking her to live at Olga's teacher's flat.

=== Unseen characters ===
The play has several important characters who are talked about frequently, but never seen onstage. These include Protopopov, head of the local Council and Natasha's lover; Vershinin's suicidal wife and two daughters; Kulygin's beloved superior the headmaster of the high school, and Natasha's children (Bobik and Sofia). JL Styan contends in his The Elements of Drama that in the last act Chekhov revised the text to show that Protopopov is the real father of Sofia: "The children are to be tended by their respective fathers" — Andrey pushes Bobik in his pram, and Protopopov sits with Sofia.

== Synopsis ==
=== Act I ===
Olga (the eldest sister) has worked as a schoolteacher and after school tutor for four years. Masha, middle sister and artist of the family (trained as a concert pianist), is married to Feodor Kulygin, a schoolteacher. Masha, younger than he, was enchanted by his wisdom but seven years later she sees through his pedantry and attempts to compensate for the emptiness between them. Irina, the youngest sister, is still full of expectation, speaking of going to Moscow and meeting her true love. The sisters grew up in Moscow, and they all long to return to the happiness of that time. Andrei is the only young man in the family; his sisters adore him. He falls in love with Natalia Ivanovna ("Natasha"), who is rather "common" compared to the sisters and regarded by them with disdain. The play begins on the first anniversary of the death of their father, Sergei Prozorov. It is also Irina's name-day, and everyone, including the soldiers (led by Vershinin) bringing with them a sense of noble idealism, come together to celebrate it. At the close of the act, Andrei confesses his feelings to Natasha, and proposes.

=== Act II ===
Almost a year later, Andrei and Natasha are married with their baby (offstage), a son named Bobik. Natasha is having an affair with Protopopov, Andrei's superior, who is never seen onstage. Masha comes home flushed from a night out, and it is clear that she and her companion, Lieutenant-Colonel Vershinin, are giddy with their mutual love for one another. Natasha manipulatively quashes the plans for a party in the home; the resultant quiet suggests that happiness is being quashed as well. Tuzenbach and Solyony both declare their love for Irina.

=== Act III ===
About a year later in Olga and Irina's room—a clear sign that Natasha is taking over the household, as she asked them to share a room so that Bobik could have a separate room. There has been a fire in the town, and people are passing in and out, carrying materials to give aid. Olga, Masha and Irina are angry with Andrei for mortgaging their home without their knowledge or consent, keeping the money to pay off his gambling debts and ceding all power over the household to Natasha. Natasha is cruel to the aged family retainer, Anfisa, but Olga's best efforts to counter this fail. Masha, alone with her sisters, tells them of her romance with Vershinin. At one point, Kulygin blunders into the room, doting foolishly on Masha, and she leaves. Irina despairs at the turn her life has taken, the life of a municipal worker, and rails at the folly of her aspirations. Supported by Olga's realistic outlook, Irina decides to accept Tuzenbach's offer of marriage although she does not love him. Andrei vents his self-hatred, acknowledges his awareness of his folly and his disappointment in Natasha, and begs his sisters' forgiveness for everything.

=== Act IV ===
The soldiers are preparing to leave the area. A photograph is taken. There is tension because Solyony has challenged Tuzenbach to a duel. Solyony had told Irina that he would kill any successful suitor for her hand, but she still agreed to marry Tuzenbach, notwithstanding which she confesses that she cannot love him. Tuzenbach, having left the Army, is under no obligation to agree to the duel but does so anyway, losing his life for what would have been a loveless marriage. As the soldiers are leaving, a shot is heard, and Tuzenbach's death in the duel is announced shortly before the end of the play.

Masha has to be pulled, sobbing, from Vershinin's arms, but her husband compassionately asks that they start again. Olga has reluctantly accepted the position of permanent headmistress of the school where she teaches and is moving out. She is taking Anfisa with her, rescuing the elderly woman from Natasha.

Irina's fate is uncertain but, even in her grief at Tuzenbach's death, she wants to persevere as a teacher. Natasha remains as the chatelaine, in charge of everything. Andrei is stuck in his marriage with two children, unwilling and unable to do anything for his wife or himself. As the play closes, the three sisters stand in a desperate embrace, gazing off as the soldiers depart to the sound of marching music. As Chebutykin sings Ta-ra-ra-boom-di-ay to himself, (Note: Contemporary audiences would have recognised this song, from 1892, as Chebutykin's ironic reference to the doomed affair between Masha and Vershinin — Rayfield, Donald (2005). Gottlieb, Vera (ed.). The Cambridge Companion to Chekhov. London: Routledge. p. 210. ISBN 9780521589178.) Olga's final lines seek an end to the confusion the sisters feel at life's sufferings and joy: "If we only knew... If we only knew."

== Premiere ==
The play was written for the Moscow Art Theatre and it opened on 31 January 1901, under the direction of Konstantin Stanislavski and Vladimir Nemirovich-Danchenko. Stanislavski played Vershinin and the sisters were Olga Knipper (for whom Chekhov wrote the part of Masha), Margarita Savitskaya as Olga and Maria Andreyeva as Irina. Maria Lilina (Stanislavski's wife) was Natasha, Vsevolod Meyerhold appeared as Tusenbach, Mikhail Gromov as Solyony, (Note: According to N. Efros Leonid Leonidov played Solyony. He took up this part indeed, but only after 1903, when he joined Moscow Art Theatre. Coincidentally, Leonidov did play Solyony during the 1900/1901 season too, but as part of the Odessa-based Solovtsov Troupe. – Leonodov's biography at the Moscow Art Theatre site.) Alexander Artyom as Artem Chebutykin, Ioasaf Tikhomirov as Fedotik, Ivan Moskvin as Rode, Vladimir Gribunin as Ferapont, and Maria Samarova as Anfisa.

Reception was mixed. Chekhov felt that Stanislavski's "exuberant" direction had masked the subtleties of the work and that only Knipper had shown her character developing in the manner the playwright had intended. In the directors' view, the point was to show the hopes, aspirations and dreams of the characters, but audiences were affected by the pathos of the sisters' loneliness and desperation and by their eventual, uncomplaining acceptance of their situation. Nonetheless the piece proved popular and soon it became established in the company's repertoire.

== Notable productions ==
Dates	Production	Director	Notes
22 June 1964	Actors Studio	Lee Strasberg	New English version by Randall Jarrell; cast included Geraldine Page, Kim Stanley, Shirley Knight, Robert Loggia, Kevin McCarthy among others
24 May 1965	BBC Home Service	John Tydeman	English translation by Elisaveta Fen; adapted for radio by Peter Watts; cast included Paul Scofield, Lynn Redgrave, Ian McKellen, Jill Bennett, among others
29 September 1979	The Other Place, Stratford-upon-Avon	Trevor Nunn	Version by Richard Cottrell with Suzanne Bertish as Masha, Emily Richard as Irina and Janet Dale as Olga.
28 March 1990	Gate Theatre, Dublin and Royal Court Theatre, London	Adrian Noble	Version by Frank McGuinness with real-life sisters in the title roles: Sinéad Cusack as Masha, Sorcha Cusack as Olga and Niamh Cusack as Irina. Their father, Cyril Cusack played Chebutykin.
30 August – 13 October 2007	Soulpepper Theatre, Toronto	László Marton	Version by Nicolas Billon
November 2008	Regent's Canal, Camden, London.	Tanya Roberts	An adaptation by the Metra Theatre
29 July – 3 August 2008	Playhouse, QPAC, Brisbane	Declan Donnellan	Chekhov International Theatre Festival (Moscow), part of Brisbane Festival 2008
5 May 2009 – 14 June 2009	Artists Repertory Theatre, Portland	Jon Kretzu	Adapted by Tracy Letts
12 January – 6 March 2011	Classic Stage Company, NYC	Austin Pendleton	Real-life husband and wife actors Maggie Gyllenhaal and Peter Sarsgaard starred, alongside Jessica Hecht and Juliet Rylance.
14 February – 8 March 2020	The Bindery, San Francisco	Angie Higgins	Starring Marcia Aguilar

- John Gielgud's 1936–37 landmark season at the Queen's Theatre included a well-received production with Peggy Ashcroft as Irina and Michael Redgrave as Tusenbach.
- In 1942, Judith Anderson portrayed Olga, Katharine Cornell portrayed Masha, Gertrude Musgrove portrayed Irina, and Ruth Gordon portrayed Natasha on Broadway. The production was significant enough to land the cast on the cover of Time on 21 December 1942, which proclaimed it "a dream production by anybody's reckoning – the most glittering cast the theatre has seen, commercially, in this generation".
- The 1963 inaugural season of the Guthrie Theater included a production with Jessica Tandy as Olga.
- There is a filmed record of a mid-1960s production by The Actors Studio with Kim Stanley and Geraldine Page as Masha and Olga, respectively, supported by Sandy Dennis's Irina and Shelley Winters as Natasha.
- American Film Theatre in 1970 filmed a version with a witty Masha from Joan Plowright opposite Alan Bates as Vershinin, with Ronald Pickup as Tusenbach and Laurence Olivier, who co-directed, playing Chebutykin. The film was based on a theatre production that Olivier directed at the National Theatre in 1967.
- Rosemary Harris, Ellen Burstyn and Tovah Feldshuh played, respectively, Olga, Masha and Irina at the Brooklyn Academy of Music in the 1970s with René Auberjonois as Solyony.
- A 1982 production at Manhattan Theatre Club, had Dianne Wiest as Masha, Lisa Banes as Olga, Mia Dillon as Irina, Christine Ebersole as Natasha, Sam Waterston as Vershinin, Jeff Daniels as Andrei, Bob Balaban as Tusenbach, and Jack Gilford as Chebutykin.
- Chicago's Steppenwolf Theatre Company put one together under the direction of Austin Pendleton, with Molly Regan as Olga, Joan Allen as Masha, Rondi Reed as Natasha, and Kevin Anderson as Solyony.
- In 1985 Casper Wrede directed a production at the Royal Exchange, Manchester with Cheryl Prime as Natasha, Emma Piper as Olga, Janet McTeer as Masha, Niamh Cusack as Irina and Espen Skjønberg as Dr Chebutykin.
- The Roundabout Theatre in New York had Jerry Stiller as Chebutykin, Billy Crudup as Solyony, Eric Stoltz as Tuzenbach, Lili Taylor as Irina, Paul Giamatti as Andrei, Amy Irving as Olga, Jeanne Tripplehorn as Masha, Calista Flockhart as Natasha, and David Strathairn as Vershinin.
- In 1990, the Irish theatrical dynasty, the Cusacks, were cast in the play, in a new version by Frank McGuinness, which opened at the Gate Theatre in Dublin with the three award-winning sisters Sinéad Cusack (Masha), Sorcha Cusack (Olga) and Niamh Cusack (Irina) in the title rôles and their father Cyril Cusack as Dr. Chebutykin. This is the only production ever to cast three 'real' sisters, professional actors in their own right, in the title rôles. The production, which was directed by the then newly appointed Artistic Director of the Royal Shakespeare Company, Adrian Noble, transferred to London's Royal Court Theatre for a sell-out season in 1991. Amongst the supporting cast were Lesley Manville as Natasha and Finbar Lynch as Tusenbach.
- In 1991, sisters Vanessa Redgrave (Olga) and Lynn Redgrave (Masha) made their first and only appearance together onstage in this, with niece Jemma Redgrave as Irina at the Queen's Theatre, London.
- In 1999, The Thrie Sisters, a translation into Scots by David Purves was produced by Theatre Alba at Lauriston Halls on the Edinburgh Festival Fringe.
- In 2003, Romanian director Radu Afrim adapted the play in a controversial production at the Andrei Mureșanu theatre in Sfântu Gheorghe, highly criticized by Michael Billington, but praised by other critics, leading to a local controversy in the Romanian press which would catapult Afrim to national superstardom in Romanian theatre.
- The play was produced in 2010 at the Lyric Hammersmith by Filter with a cast including Poppy Miller, Romola Garai, and Clare Dunne.
- In 2010, the play was adapted by for Theatre na Fidlovačce, Prague as Tři sestry. The sisters played Andrea Černá, Zuzana Vejvodová and Martina Randová and other actors were Otakar Brousek ml. as Vershinin, Tomáš Töpfer as Doctor Chebutykin
- In 2012, the play was staged at the Young Vic, directed by Benedict Andrews in his own new version. The cast included Vanessa Kirby, Mariah Gale, and Sam Troughton.
- In 2014, the play was staged at the Southwark Playhouse, directed by Russell Bolam. The cast included Olivia Hallinan, Holliday Grainger, and Paul McGann.
- In 2017, the play was staged at the Studio Theatre directed by Jackson Gay in conjunction with a modern adaption called No Sisters directed by Aaron Posner.
- In 2017, the play was staged by Sydney Theatre Company at the Drama Theatre, Sydney Opera House from 6 November — 16 December. The new adaptation was by Andrew Upton and the cast included Alison Bell as Olga, Miranda Daughtry as Irina and Harry Greenwood as Tusenbach.
- In 2019, the play was staged at the Almeida Theatre in London, with Alan Williams playing Ivan Romanovich Chebutykin.
- In 2023, the play was performed at the Williamstown Theatre Festival. The production notably featured real-life siblings Louisa Jacobson, Grace Gummer, Mamie Gummer, and Henry Wolfe, the children of actress Meryl Streep, as the eponymous sisters and their brother, Andrei. The cast also included Dylan Baker, Juliana Canfield, Edmund Donovan, Dario Ladani Sanchez, Robert Sean Leonard, Omar Metwally, John Rothman, and Jo Yang.

== Adaptations ==
- Three Sisters has been adapted into a full-length opera by Hungarian composer Péter Eötvös and Claus H. Henneberg, as Tri sestry (Three Sisters). It was premiered at the Opéra National de Lyon in 1998, directed by Ushio Amagatsu, and conducted by Kent Nagano and the composer.
- Three Sisters on Hope Street, a 2008 British play co-written by Diane Samuels and Tracy-Ann Oberman, reinterprets Chekhov's play by transferring events to Liverpool after World War II and re-casting the Pozorov sisters as three Jewish Englishwomen. It opened at the Everyman Theatre, Liverpool on 25 January 2008 before beginning a second run at the Hampstead Theatre in London.
- In 2011, the play was adapted by Blake Morrison for Northern Broadsides as We Are Three Sisters, drawing out parallels with the lives of the Brontë sisters.
- Track 3, a 2013 adaptation of the play created by Theatre Movement Bazaar co-founders, Tina Kronis and Richard Alger. It premiered in Los Angeles and has played in the UK, China, and in 2017 was the first US production in over 25 years to play in the Chekhov International Theatre Festival in Moscow.
- In 2014, an adaptation by John Byrne, set in Dunoon, Scotland, in the middle of the 20th Century, was produced by the Tron Theatre Company, Glasgow.
- Moscow Moscow Moscow Moscow Moscow Moscow, a stage adaptation by Halley Feiffer that approaches the story through a contemporary lens, originally premiering in 2017.
- In 2020, an adaptation by Inua Ellams, set in Owerri, Nigeria during the Nigerian Civil War between 1967 and 1970, was staged at the Lyttelton Theatre in London.
- In 2021, an adaptation by Cristina García, The Palacios Sisters, set in 1985 Miami with the three sisters newly-arrived from Havana was done as a radionovela. In 2024, it was translated into Spanish as Las hermanas Palacios and performed as a stage play at GALA Hispanic Theatre in Washington, DC.
- In 2023, an adaptation by Ghina Fawaz, set in an airport terminal, following three women carrying histories of displacement from Vietnam, India, and Peru, blending Chekov's original text with poetry and firsthand accounts was performed at The Schapiro Theater at Columbia University, and is slated to be staged at the Edinburgh Fringe Festival in Scotland in 2027.
