= Visvesvaraya Industrial and Technological Museum =

Visvesvaraya Industrial & Technological Museum
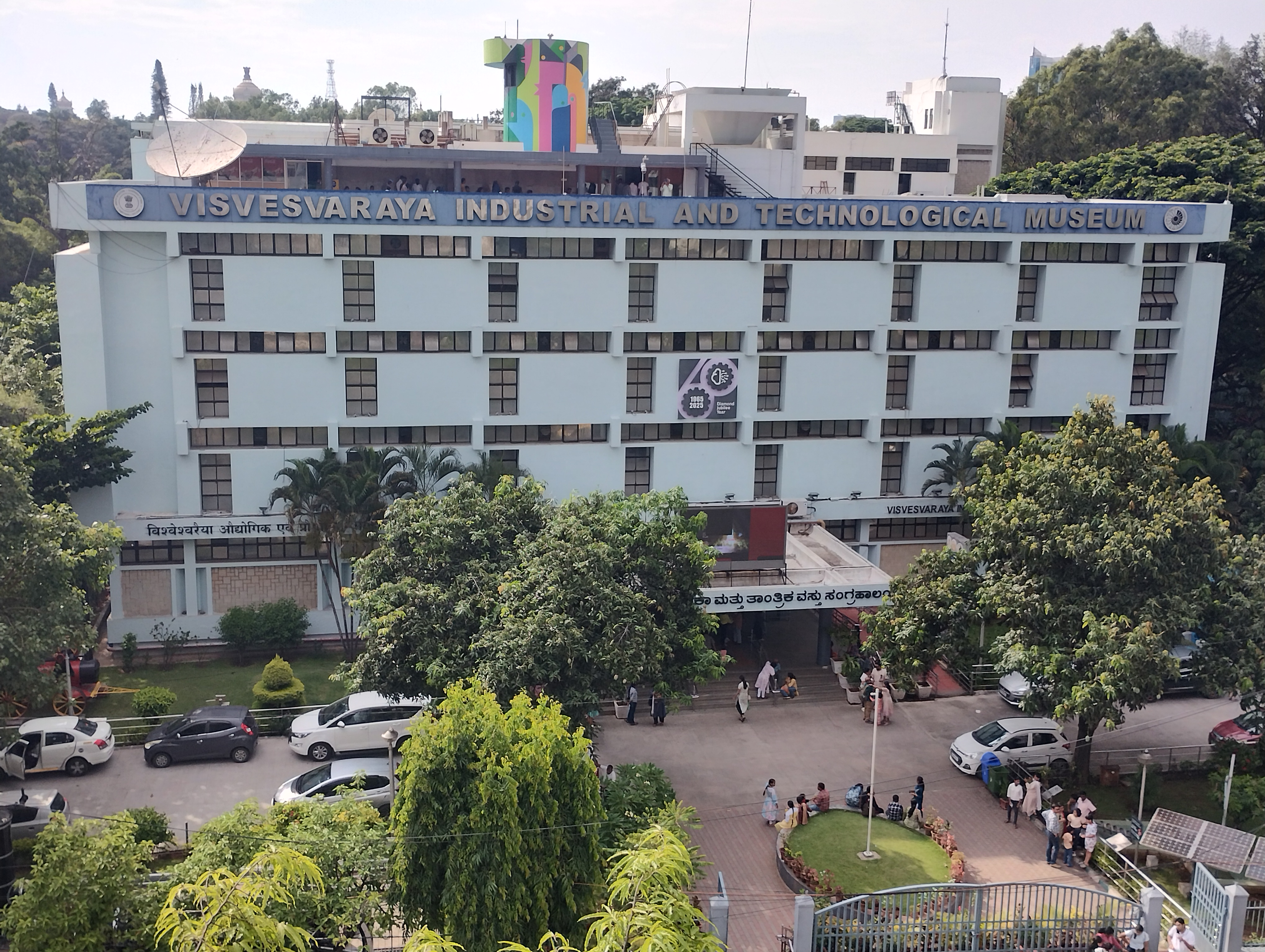
- The museum in 2025

- Location in the Map of Bangalore
- Established: 14 July 1962
- Location: Kasturba road, Bangalore, India
- Coordinates: 12.975100°N 77.596400°E
- Type: Science museum
- Visitors: 1 million+
- Director: K Sajoo Bhaskaran
- Curators: Cyril K Babu, Jyoti Mehra, Navaram Kumar, Gantla Suresh, Divya Tawra
- Website: Official website

The Visvesvaraya Industrial and Technological Museum (VITM), Bangalore, India, a constituent unit of the National Council of Science Museums (NCSM), Ministry of Culture, Government of India, was established in memory of Sir M. Visvesvaraya. The 4,000 m^{2} (43,000 sq ft) building was constructed in Cubbon Park, and was inaugurated by the first Prime Minister of India, Pandit Jawaharlal Nehru, on July 14, 1962. The museum displays industrial products, scientific models and engines.

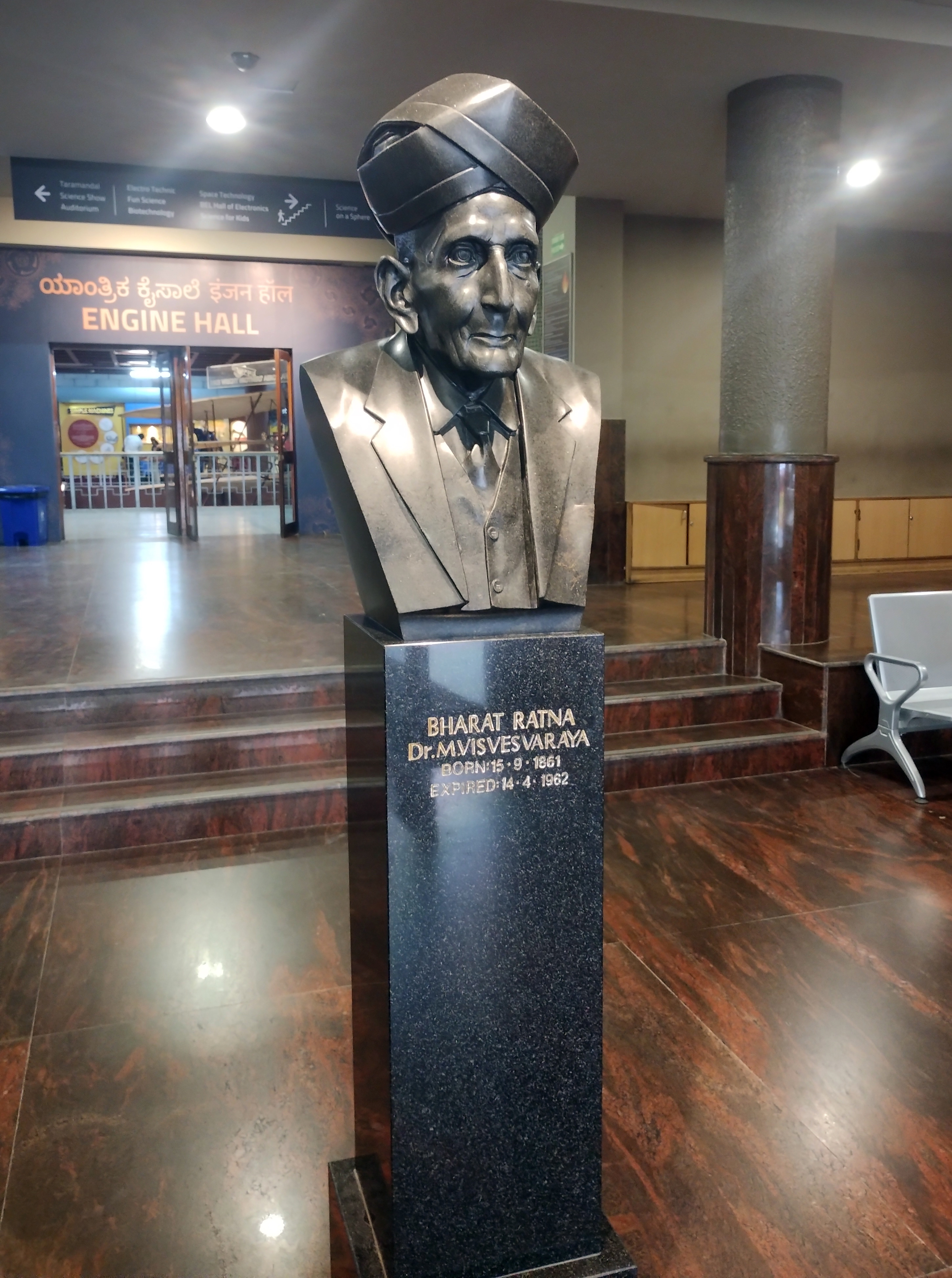
Statue of M. Visvesvaraya in the museum

== History ==
Honoring Sir M. Visvesvaraya, the All India Manufacturers Organization and Mysore State Board decided to create a science and technology museum in Bangalore. The foundation stone was laid by Shri B. D. Jatti, Chief Minister of Mysore, on 15 September 1958. The Visvesvaraya Industrial Museum Society (VIMS) came to be registered as the nodal agency in order to pool resources from various industrial houses. It was inaugurated by the first Prime Minister of India, Pandit Jawaharlal Nehru, on July 14, 1962.

The first exhibition, 'Electricity', was opened to the public on July 27, 1965.

In the year 1970, VITM launched the Mobile/Moving Science Exhibition (MSE) with 24 participatory exhibits mounted on a bus. The MSE Bus travels throughout Southern India.

In 1978, many science museums, including VITM, parted from CSIR and were brought under a newly formed society registered on 4 April 1978 as National Council of Science Museums (NCSM). In 1979 an extension was added to the building, increasing the total area of the museum to 6,900 m^{2} (74,000 sq ft).

NCSM set up four additional science centers at Gulbarga (Karnataka) in 1984, Tirunelveli (Tamil Nadu) in 1987, Tirupati (Andhra Pradesh)in 1993 and at Kozhikode, Kerala in 1997, which are functioning under the direct administrative control of VITM. Thus, VITM has become the southern zone headquarters of NCSM.

The museum attracts nearly one million visitors a year, and is open on all days (except Deepavali and Ganesha Chathurthi) from 09:30 to 18:00.

== Exhibition galleries ==
- Engine Hall exhibits engines of various cars, machines used in industry, a jet aircraft engine, and other mechanical devices.
- Through engaging exhibitions, the How Things Work gallery aims to illustrate how machines operate. The pulley system, gears, various motion-transfer mechanisms, levers, inclined planes, and screws that reduce effort are all included as exhibits. The use of these straightforward devices in everyday life is covered in a separate section.
- The Fun Science gallery that displays exhibits on the science of sound, optics, fluids, math and perception.
- The Electro Technic Gallery contains interactive electrical exhibits which work on the basic principles of electricity, electronics and communication. A renovated version of the Electro Technic gallery was opened to public on 8 April 2010. This gallery exhibits the classical experiments like Oersted's experiment, Barlow's wheel, and Faraday's ring. A demonstration on electrostatics, which includes a Tesla coil and a Van de Graaff generator is on display.
- The Space – Emerging Technology in the Service of Mankind gallery showcases the achievements of the Indian Space Program. It was inaugurated on 19 June 1999. The Gallery was renovated with guidance of Indian Space Research Organization and reopened as Space Technology on 28 November 2017 by A. S. Kiran Kumar and Krishnaswamy Kasturirangan. It is the first Science Gallery in India dedicated to Space and Space Technology.
- The Biotechnological Revolution hall has exhibits on the basics of biotechnology and its applications, including human genome sequencing. It opened on 4 January 2003. This exhibition has been renovated with new interactive exhibits and displays. This new-look exhibition was opened to public as 'Biotechnology' Gallery on 15 February 2021.
- The BEL Hall of Electronics was inaugurated on 29 June 2004 in collaboration with Bharat Electronics Ltd (BEL). This gallery has exhibits on the basic principles of electronics and information technology.
- The 'Science for Kids' gallery was inaugurated on 19 April 2019. There are exhibits on Our Senses, about animals, colours, light, sound etc. apart from interactive toys. There is an exhibit where kids can take photos of themselves with life-size animal models. 'Mirror maze' is another attraction in this gallery.
- The Dinosaur Alive exhibit has a moving replica of a Spinosaurus. This pneumatically-operated dinosaur can move its head, hands and tail and roll its eyes at the visitors.
- The Science on a Sphere facility was opened on 28 July 2014, in celebration of the golden jubilee of VITM.
- The Wright Brothers exhibit, also added in 2014, includes a 1:1 scale model of the Wright Brothers’ Flyer, fabricated in-house, and a flight simulator.

In addition to these exhibits, the museum includes a science show hall, a 3D theatre, a 250-seat auditorium, a telemedicine facility, an 11' Celestron telescope with GPS, and a cafeteria.

VITM has developed travelling exhibitions including The World of Astronomical Observatories, The Life and Work of Sir C. V. Raman, Nanotechnology, and The Life and Work of Sir M Visvesvaraya. VITM also hosts, on a regular basis, travelling exhibitions that are developed by other units of NCSM such as Science of Sports, Giants from the Backyard, Chemistry, Disaster - Preparing for the Worst, and Radiations Around Us.

== Gallery ==
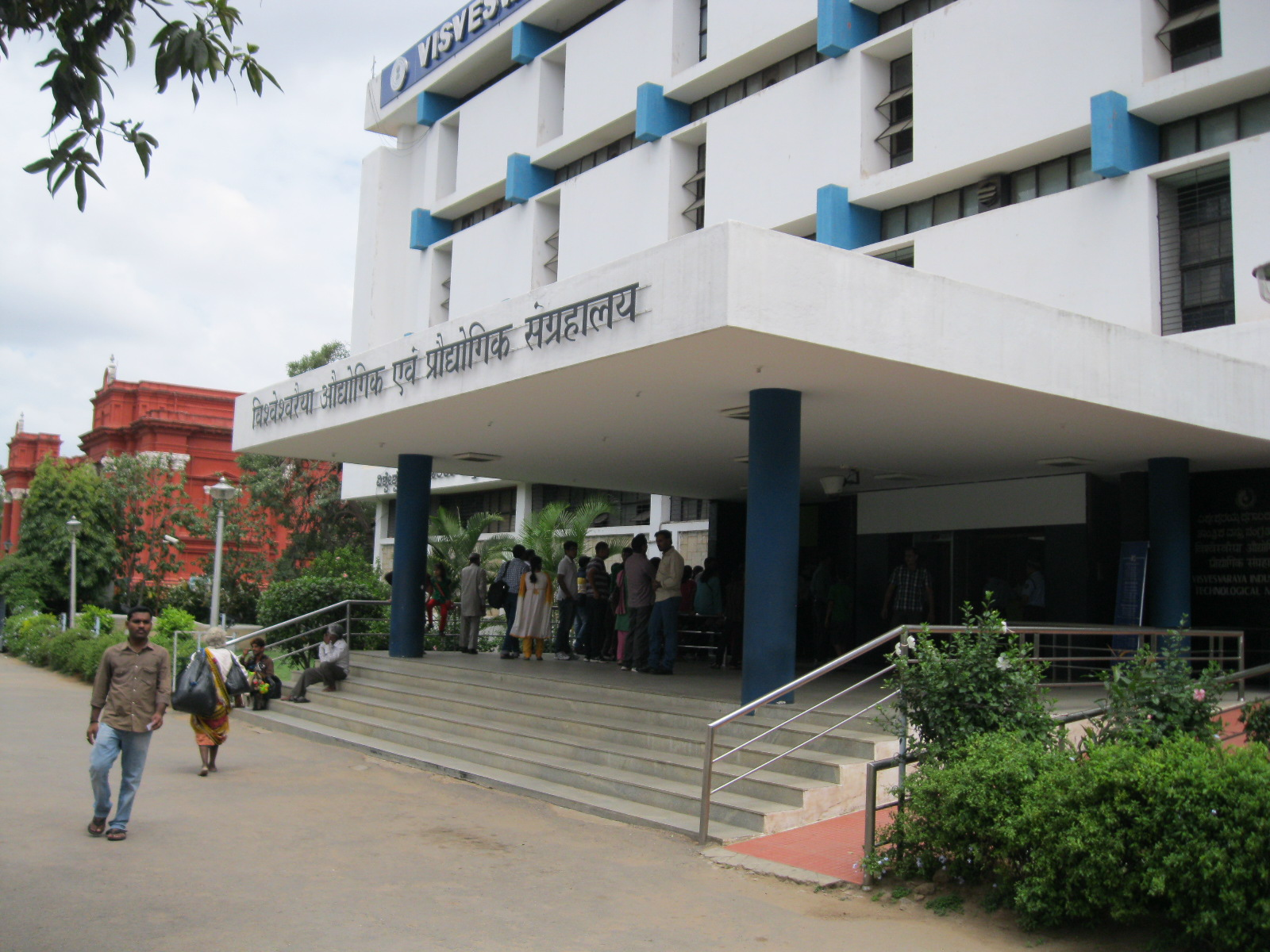
Visvesvaraya Museum entrance

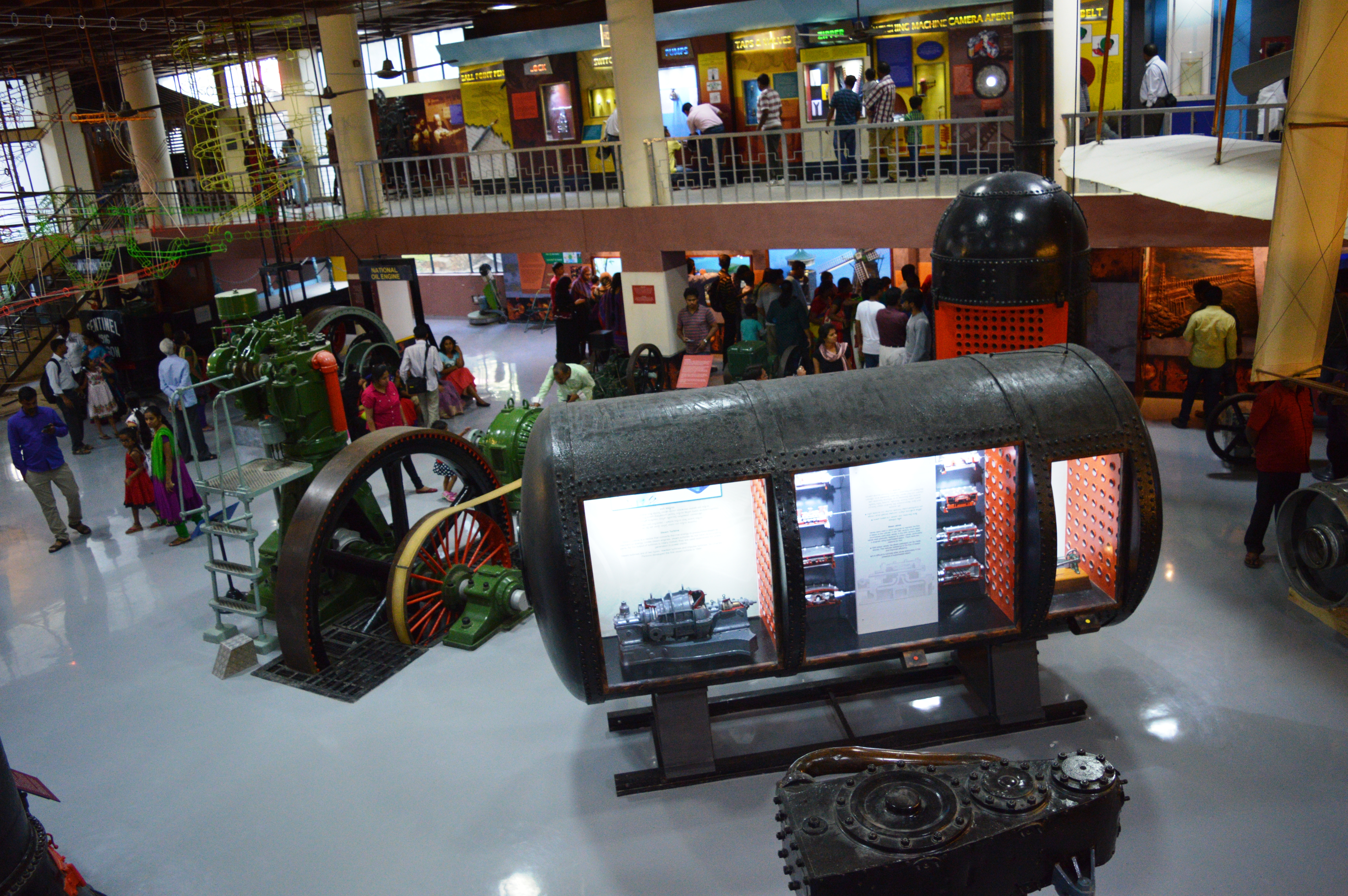
Engine Hall

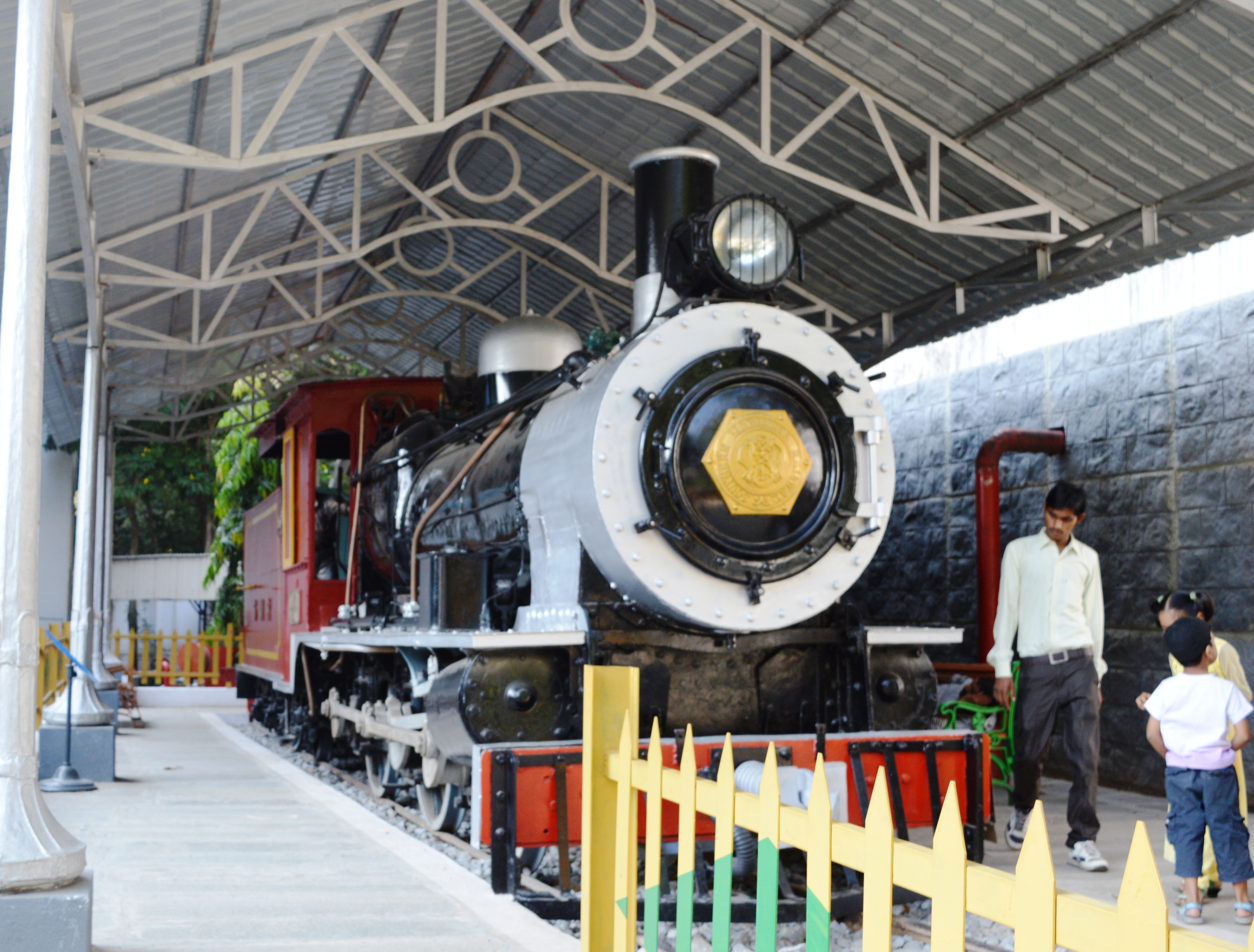
Steam Locomotive

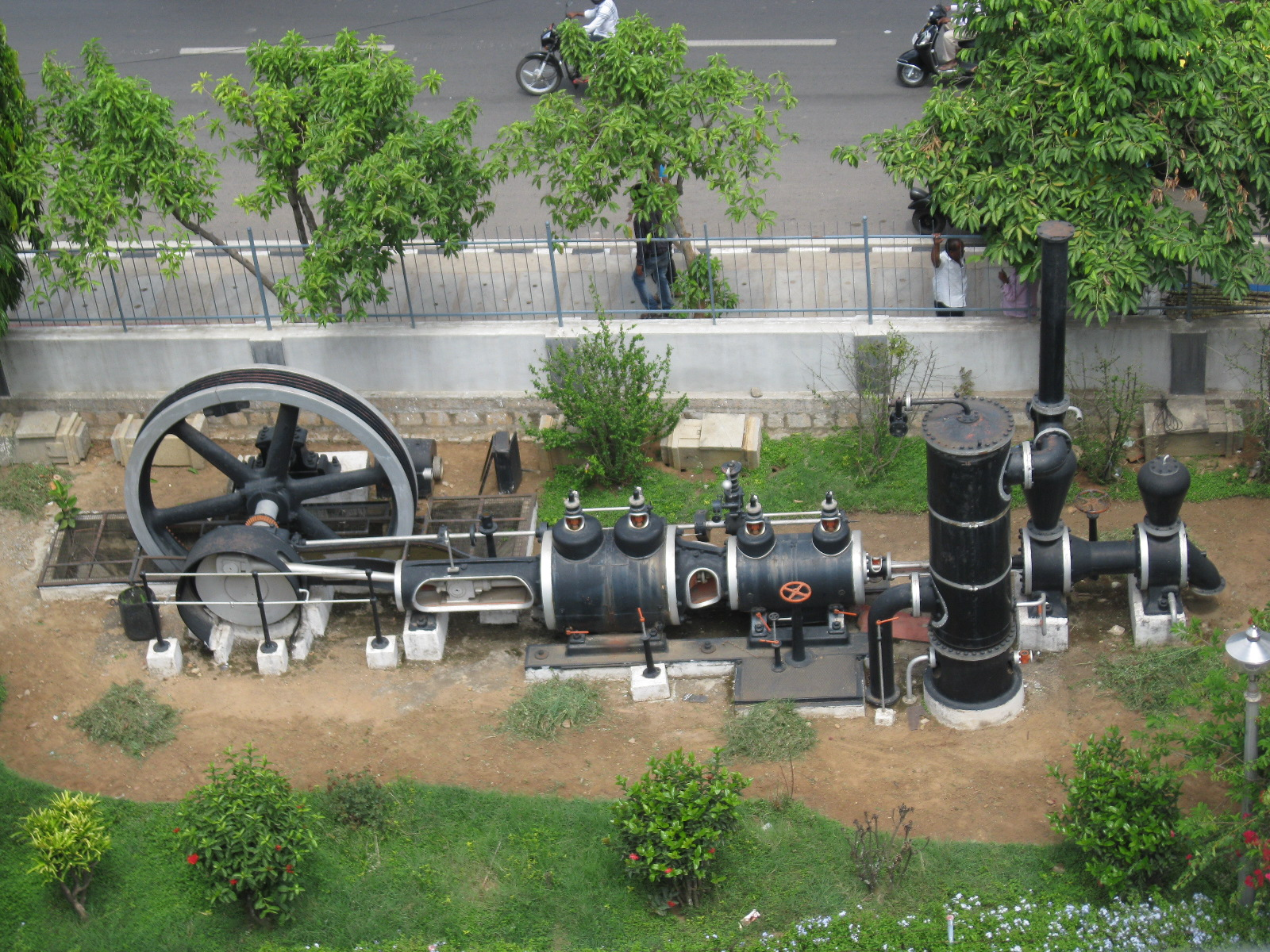
Steam-powered engine

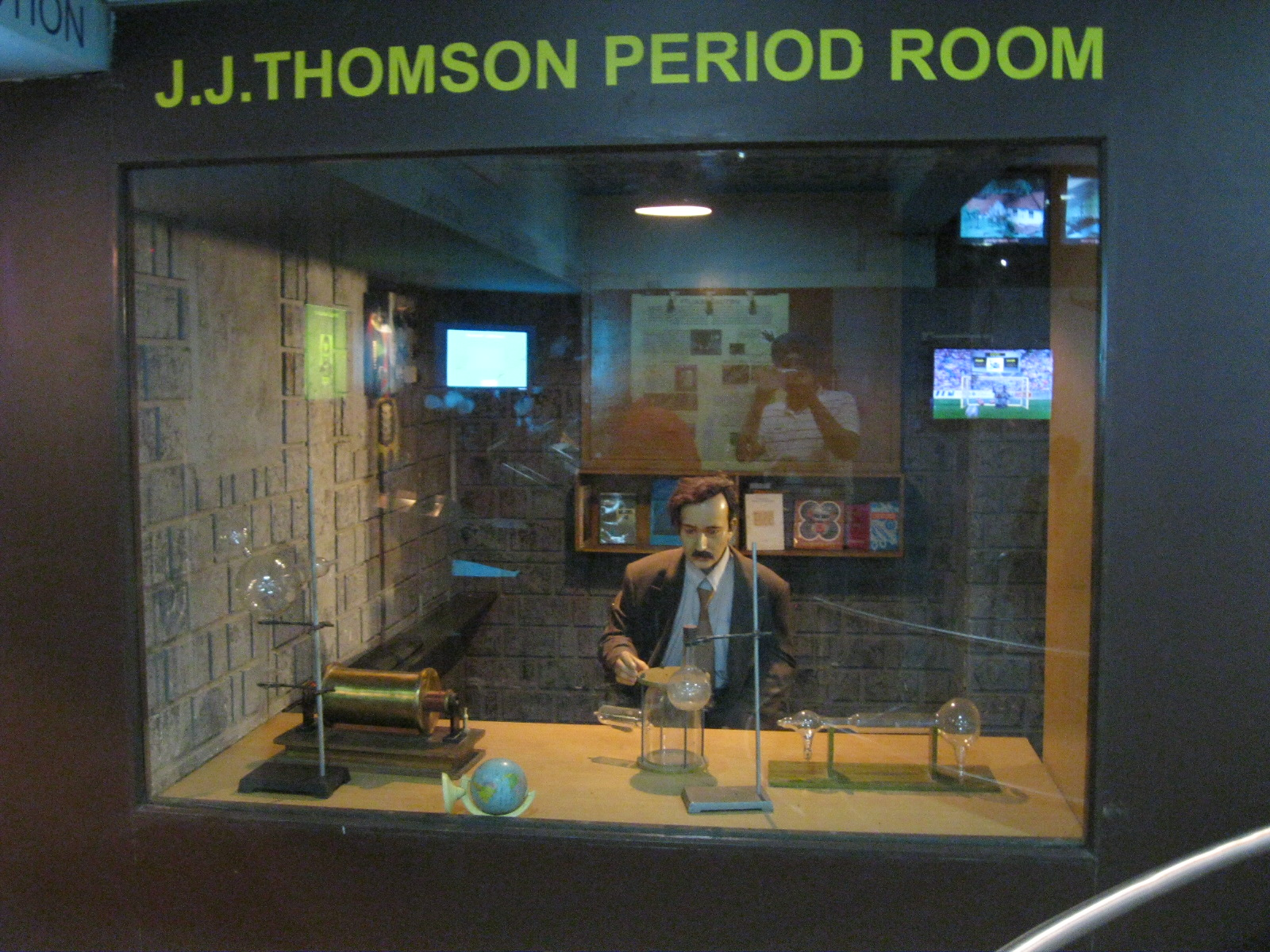
J. J. Thomson room

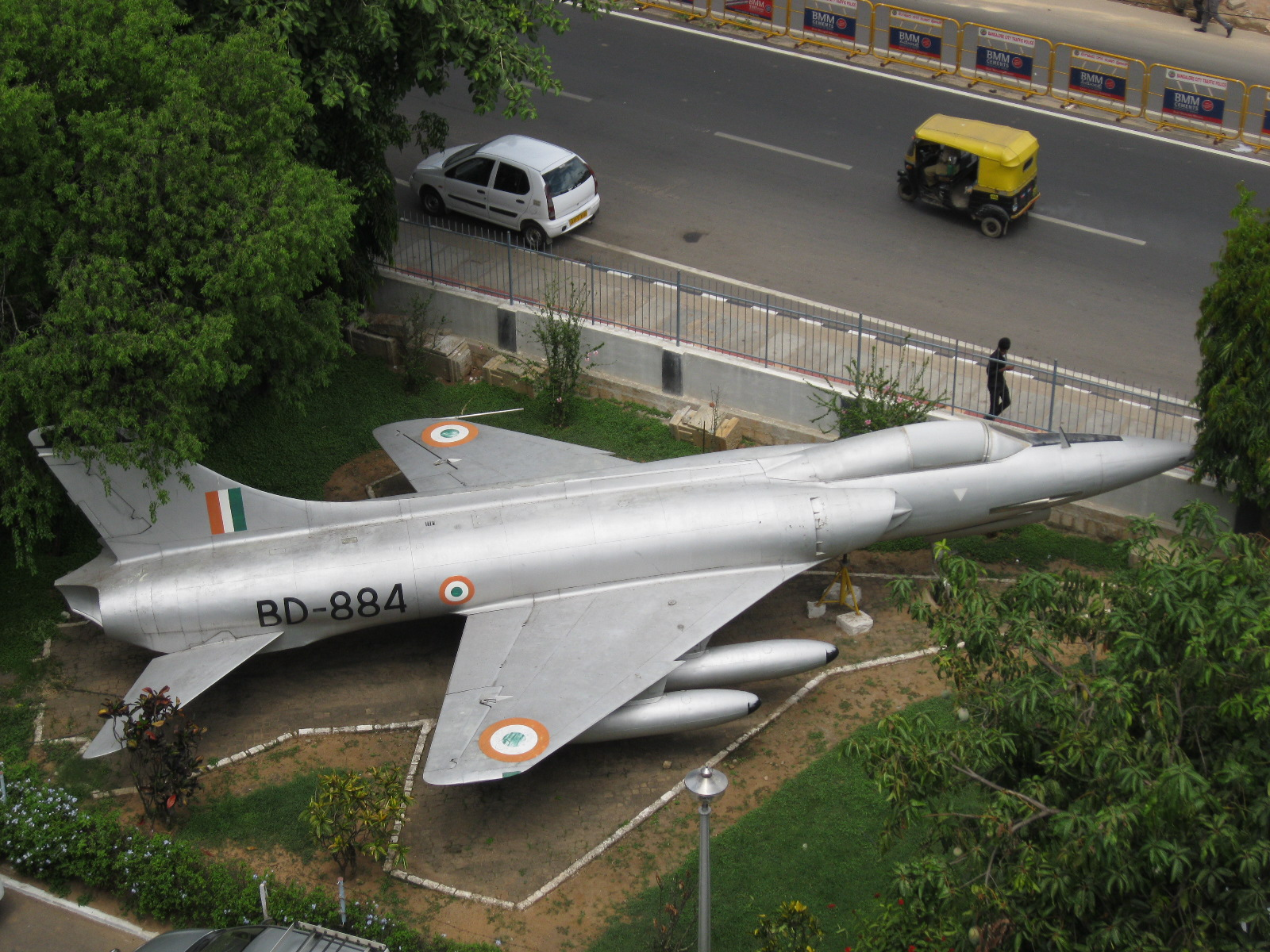
HF-24 Marut - Indian built aircraft

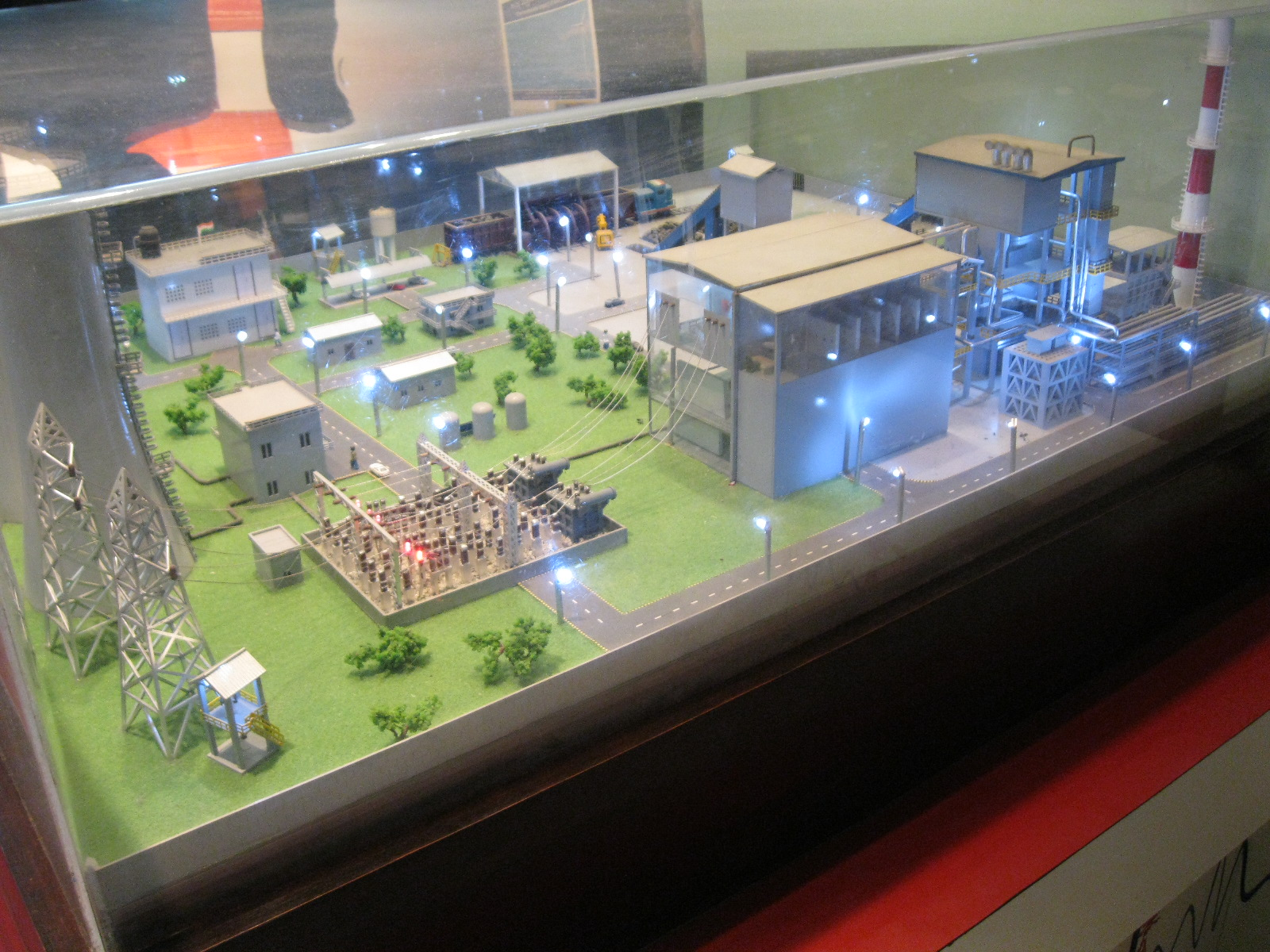
Electricity model

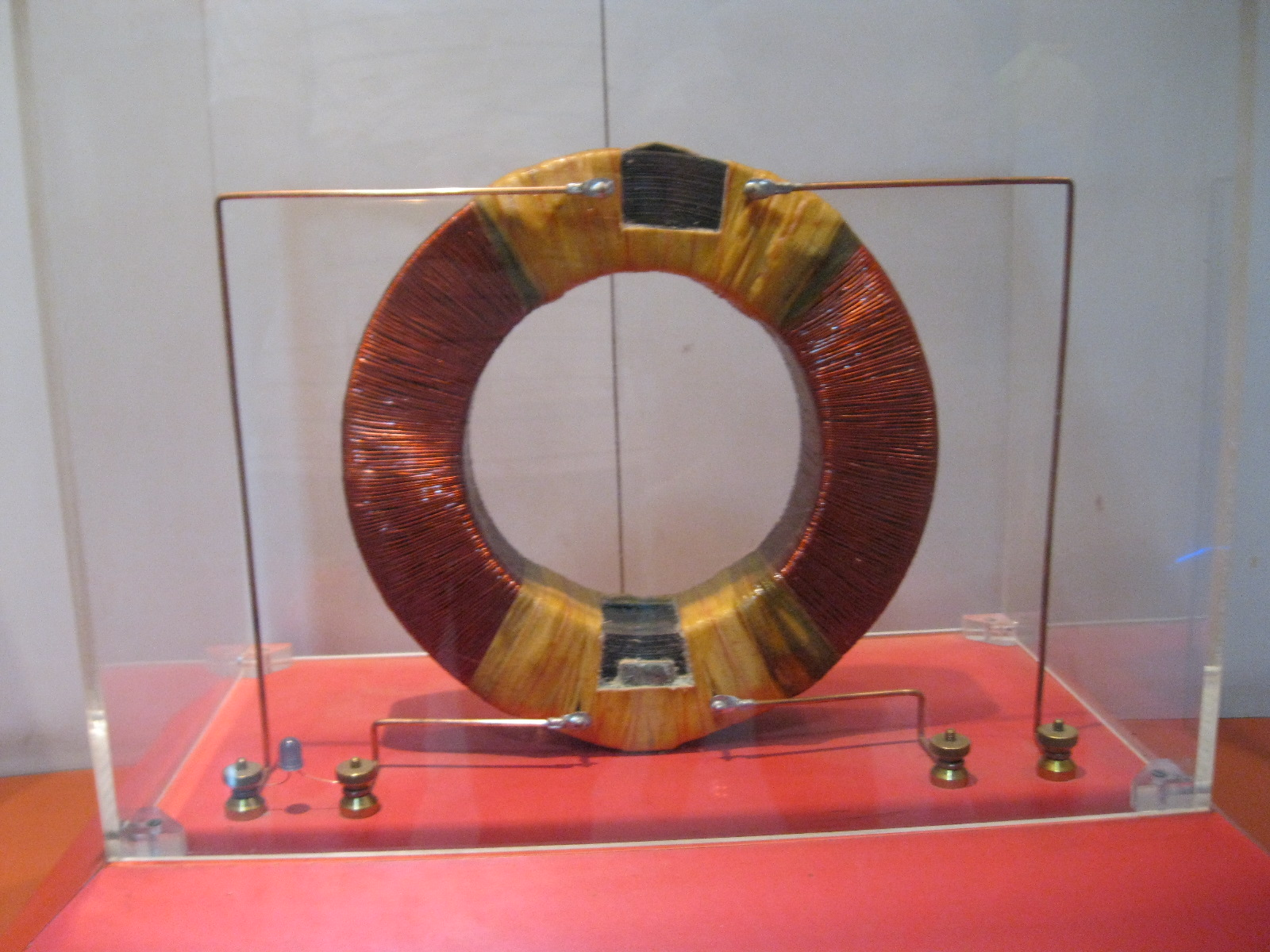
Electromagnet model

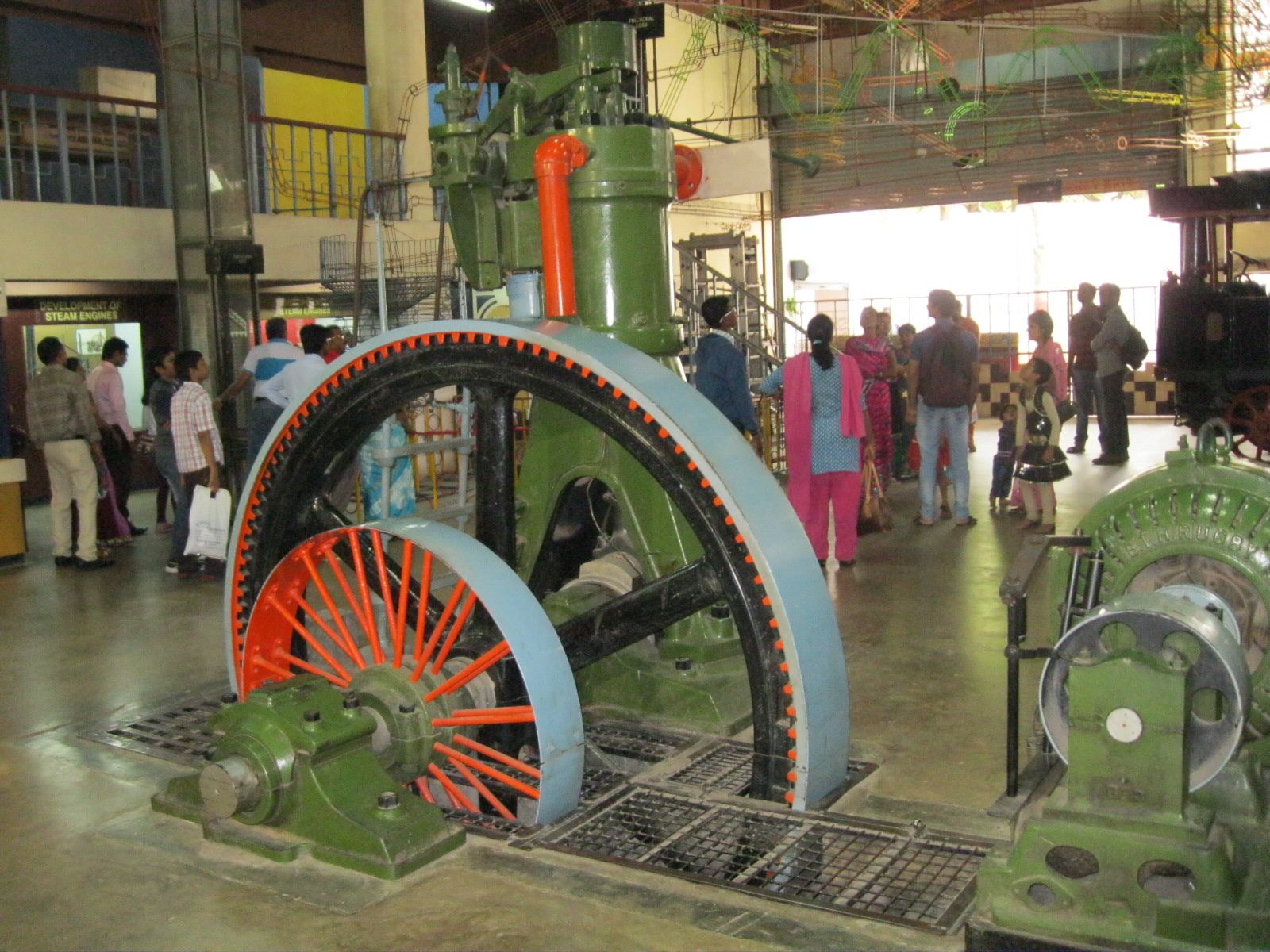
Diesel engine

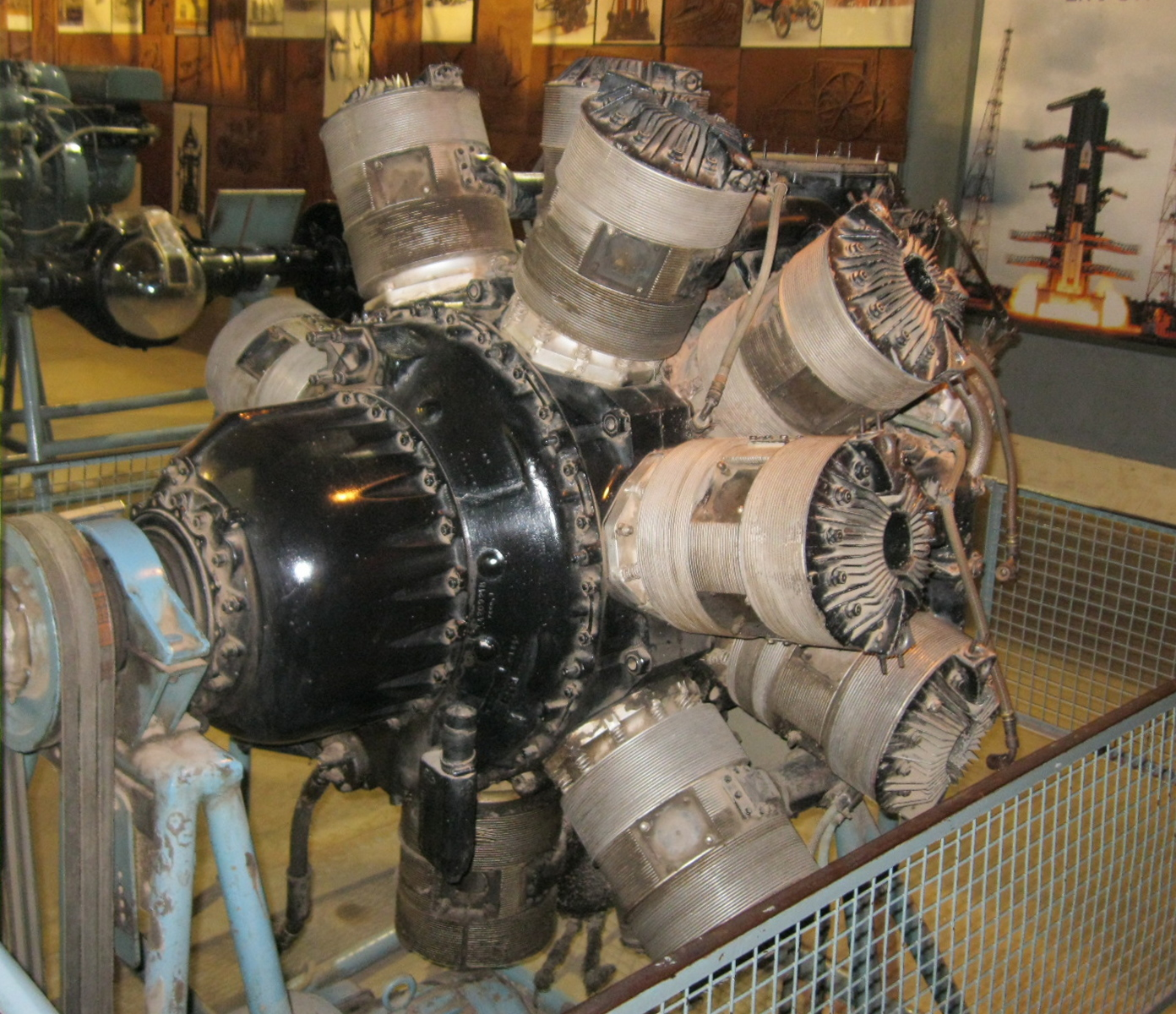
Early aircraft engine

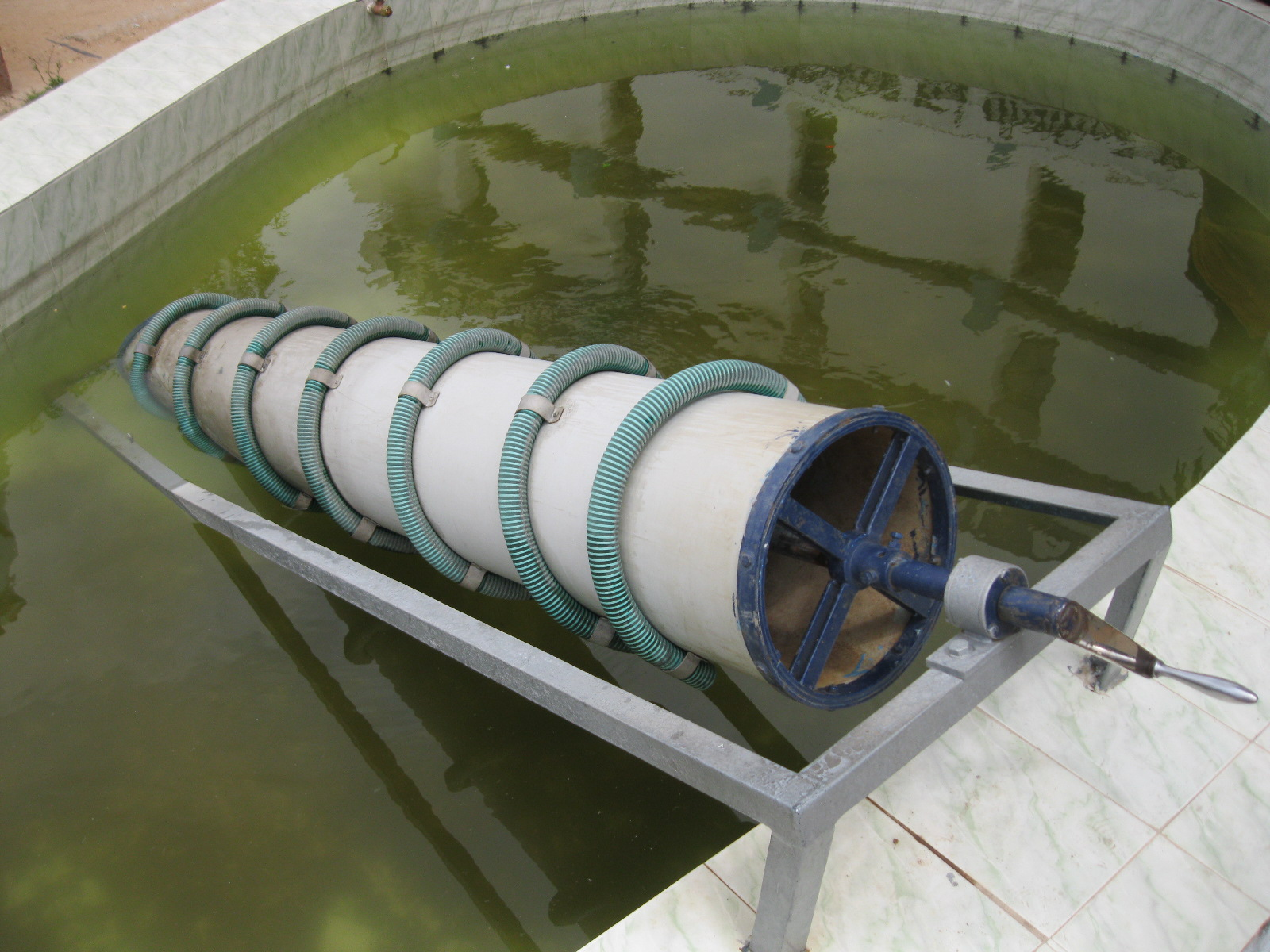
Archimedes screw

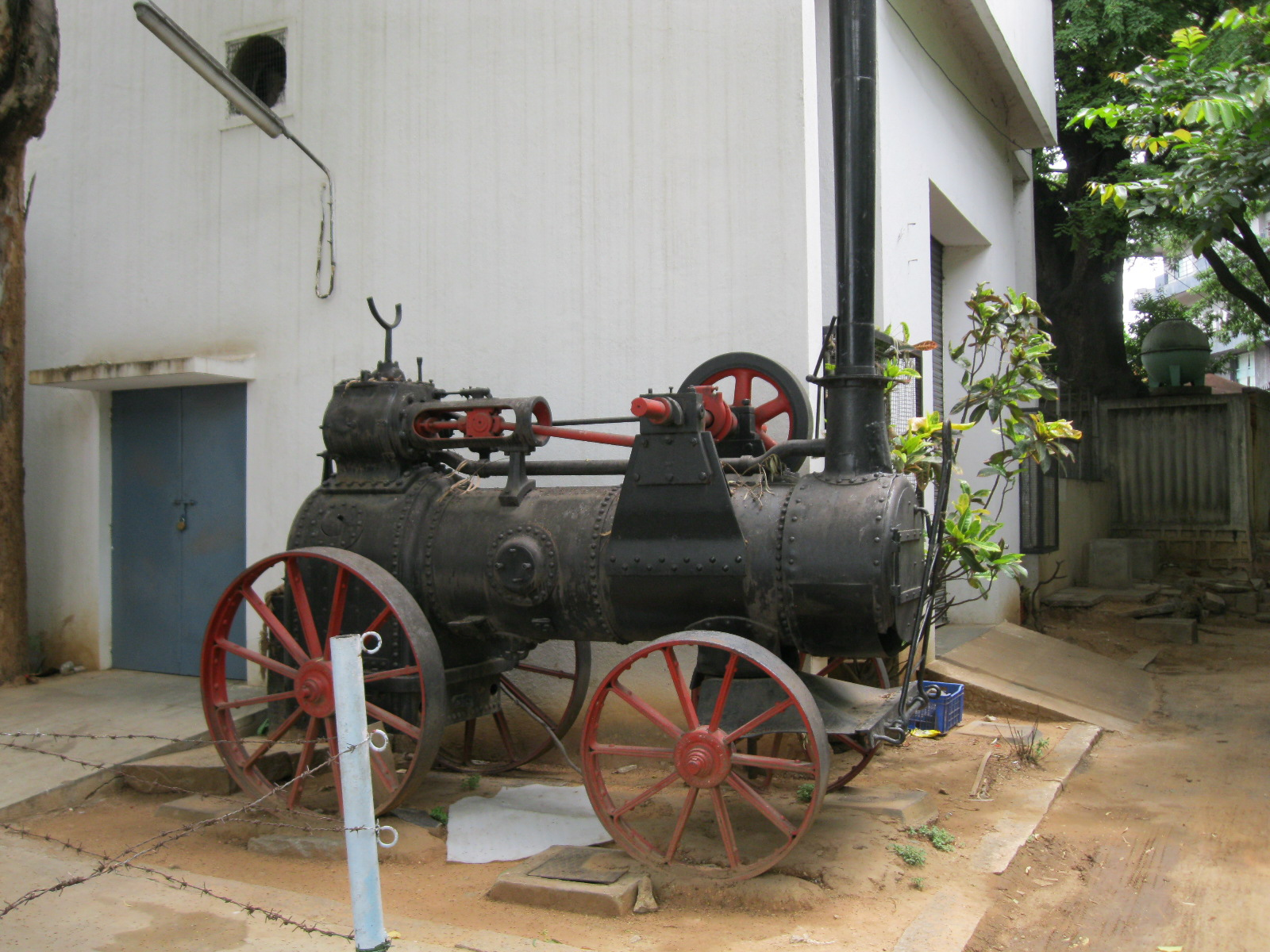
Steam engine

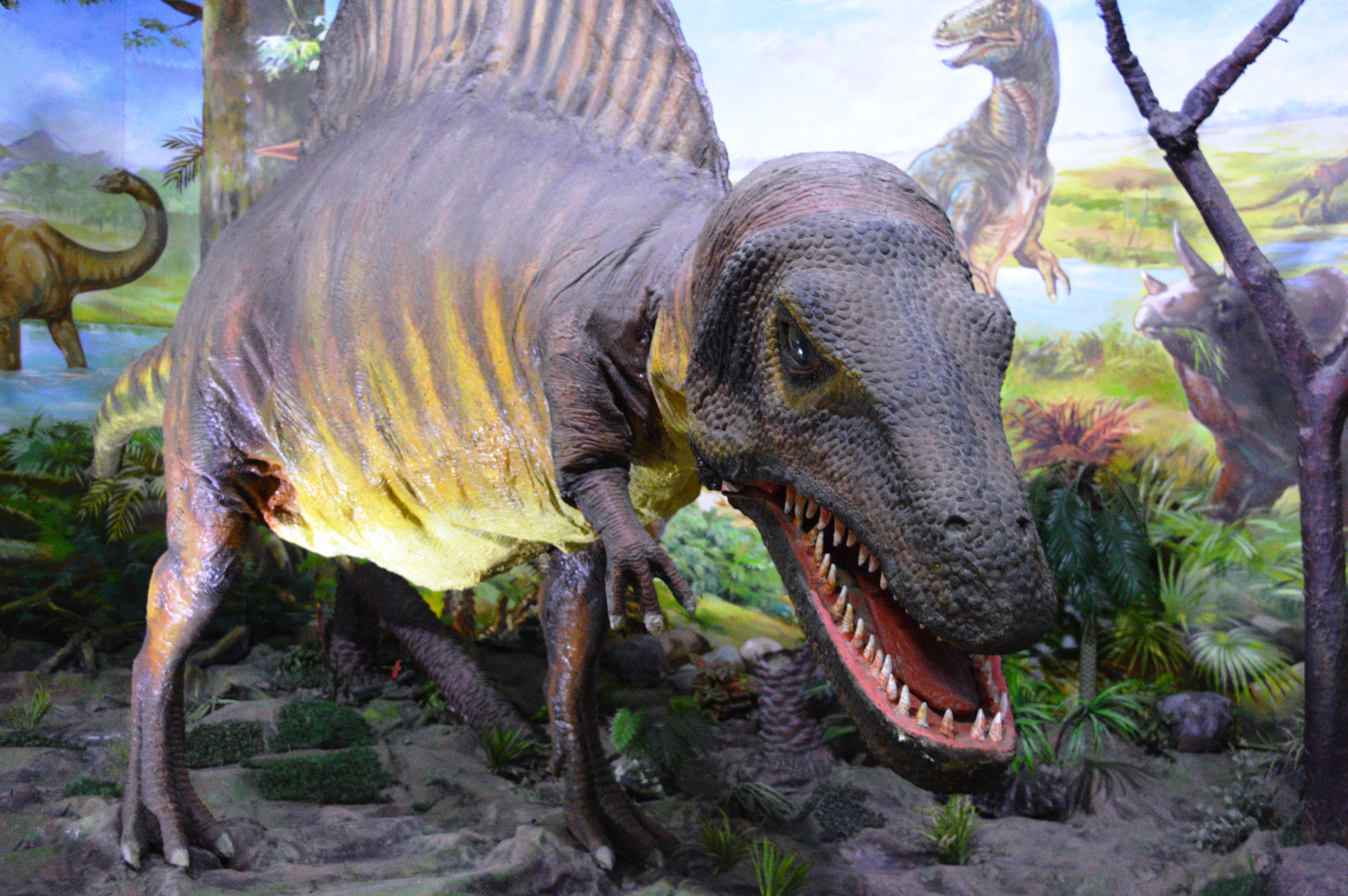
Animated Dinosaur

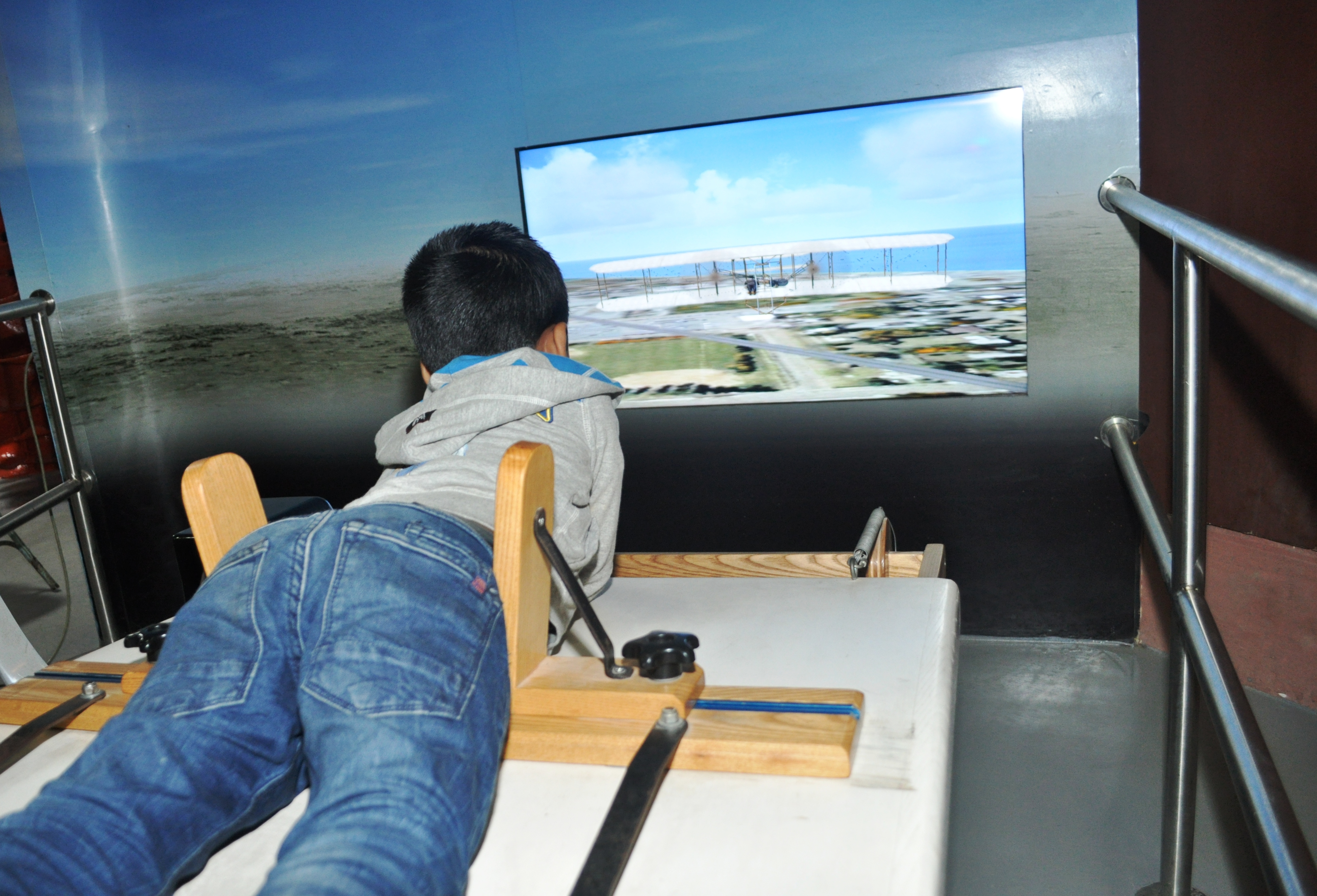
The Wright Brothers' Flyer Simulator

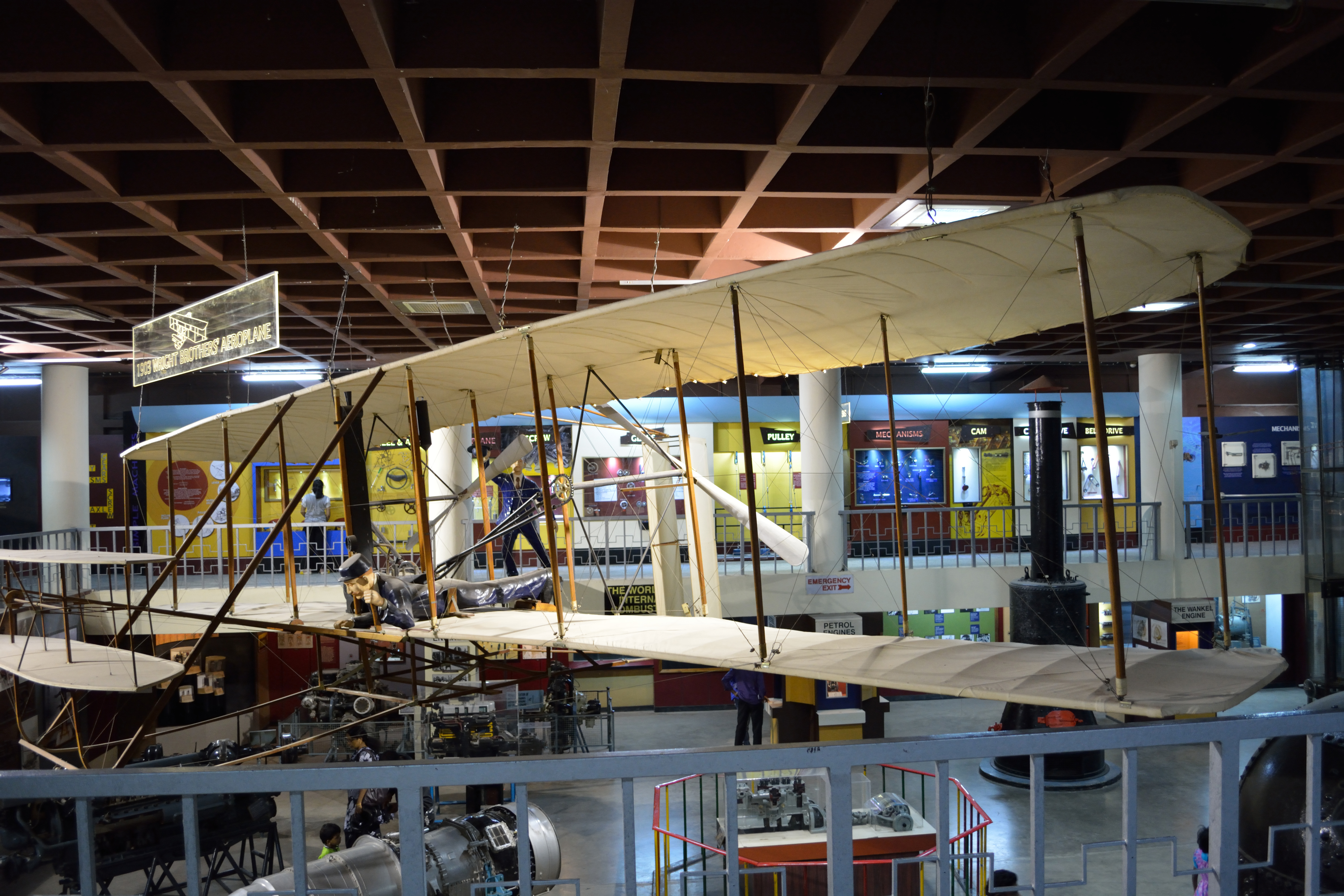
Wright Brothers' Aeroplane
