= MPM (automobile) =

Defunct American motor vehicle manufacturer

Mount Pleasant Motor Company
- Company type: Automobile manufacturer
- Industry: Automotive
- Founded: 1914; 112 years ago
- Founder: Louis J. Lampke
- Defunct: 1915; 111 years ago
- Fate: stopped production
- Headquarters: Mount Pleasant, Michigan, United States
- Products: Automobiles
- Production output: 10 (1915)

The M.P.M. was an automobile built in Mount Pleasant, Michigan by the Mount Pleasant Motor Company from 1914 to 1915.

== History ==
The M.P.M. was a medium-sized conventional car equipped with either a four-cylinder or eight-cylinder engine. After building 10 cars, financing could not be raised to continue production.

The company had plans to move its manufacturing plant to either Alma or Saginaw at the end of 1915, but the company closed before that happened.
