= Metra Theatre =

Metra Theatre is a theatre company based in East London, established in August 2005. The company specialises in reviving what it describes as "dormant" texts and adapting them for contemporary theatre audiences. Metra Theatre also aims to keep ticket prices low in order to attract individuals who might not typically attend theatrical performances.

Metra Theatre consists of artistic director Tanya Roberts, Jessica Stanley, Josephine Rogers, and Lee-Diep Chu.

== Measure for Measure ==
In 2005, nine graduating students from London Metropolitan University were selected to perform William Shakespeare's Measure for Measure at the International Shakespeare Festival in Gdańsk, Poland, as part of the festival’s education programme. The production was directed by lecturers Gian Carlo Rossi and Lucy Richardson, with vocal coaching by Jacek Ludwig Scarso. As would later become a defining feature of Metra Theatre's approach, the development of the performance was strongly influenced by the philosophical ideas of Gilles Deleuze. Deleuze’s concept of the "rhizome"—a non-hierarchical, root-like system that grows in multiple directions—played a central role in shaping the structure and interpretative framework of the production.

Although the production was a modern reworking, it retained Shakespeare’s original language and sought to present it in a way that would resonate with contemporary audiences. Rather than resetting the play in a different era or context, the production incorporated a wide range of ideas, styles, techniques, and influences to create a unique, exploratory, and intentionally non-unified piece of theatre. Metra Theatre later described the approach as tackling Measure for Measure “with feminist foresight, socio-religious thinking, and a bit of jive to boot.”

In early 2006, Metra Theatre presented a revised version of Measure for Measure at the Lion and Unicorn Theatre in Kentish Town, London. The production featured an aerial dance performance by Francesca Hyde and received positive reception, including a favourable review by Wendy Attwell of The Shakespeare Revue. The success of the performance reinforced the company’s commitment to making theatre more accessible and engaging to audiences who might not typically attend classical plays, particularly those who may feel excluded by traditional interpretations.

Simon McPhillips, in collaboration with Lucky Strike Productions and Press On Features, later adapted the script into a film version of the play. Set on a modern-day army base, the film featured Josephine Rogers reprising her role as Isabella.

== Lysistrata ==
Metra Theatre performed their second production, a modern take on Aristophanes' Lysistrata (using the Dudley Fitts' translation) in July 2006, their first production developed without the guidance of their lecturers. Continuing on with the Deleuzian theory that Measure for Measure was rooted in, they intuitively jetted through a range of different sources and concepts which have a root in the context of the play, without feeling any pressure to be part of unified theme or universal conclusion. Metra utilised the Essentialist Feminism that is present in the text, drawing on music and dance from the 1920s, evoking a time when women were slowly but firmly rejecting the image of the submissive, dependent housewife. Lysistrata was performed at the Brickhouse on Brick Lane in East London. The production continued Metra's use of different disciplines by incorporating static trapeze and the 1920s Charleston style of dance.

== The Revenger's Tragedy ==
Metra Theatre's third production was a take on Thomas Middleton's The Revenger's Tragedy, directed by Tanya Roberts and performed as part of the Enterprise 08 Festival at the Space Theatre in Isle of Dogs.

== 3 Sisters ==
Metra Theatre's fourth production was an adaptation of Anton Chekhov's Three Sisters performed on a moving canal barge. The first run took place in November, 2008 along the Regent's Canal in Camden. Over the next three years, Metra Theatre embarked on a sell-out national tour of '3 Sisters', performing in Bath (Bath Fringe Festival), Cardiff (Wales Millennium Centre), Edinburgh Fringe Festival, The Secret Garden Party, Manchester, The Lowry, Oxford. Oxford Playhouse, until finally returning the show to London.

== Shakin' the Blues Away ==
Metra Theatre's latest production explores the lives of Katharine Hepburn, Rita Hayworth, and Ann Miller. Set to tour in late 2014.
