= Visvesvaraya Iron and Steel Plant =

Steel plant in Karnataka, India

Visvesvaraya Iron and Steel Plant(Part of Steel Authority of India)
- Industry: Iron and Steel
- Founded: 18 January 1923; 103 years ago
- Founder: Krishnaraja Vadeyar
- Headquarters: Bhadravati, Karnataka, India
- Key people: Surajith Mishra (I/C Executive director)
- Products: Alloy steels, Pig iron
- Website: Official website

Visvesvaraya Iron and Steel Plant (VISL), a unit of Steel Authority of India Limited, is a plant involved in the production of alloy steels and pig iron. It is located in the city of Bhadravathi, India. It was started as the Mysore Iron Works on 18 January 1923 by Nalvadi Krishnaraja Wodeyar and his Diwan Sir M Visvesvaraya. It is now a steel plant under the jurisdiction of the Steel Authority of India Limited.

== History ==
The Iron Works were started by Nalvadi Krishnaraja Wodeyar, the king of Mysore, under the guidance of his Diwan, Sir M Visvesvaraya. The main objective was to tap the rich iron ore deposits near Kemmanagundi in the Baba Budangiri hills and manufacture pig iron and other products. A preliminary investigation of setting up an iron and steel factory at Bhadravathi was done in 1915-1916. This investigation was done by a New York based firm who explored the possibility of manufacturing pig iron with the use of charcoal fuel. The years 1918-1922 were spent in setting up the factory. To start with, a wood distillation plant for manufacturing charcoal and blast furnace for smelting iron were set up in the factory. Agencies were established in Madras, Ahmedabad and Karachi and a sales office was opened in Bombay. A cast iron pipe plant, open hearth furnace, rolling mills and a cement plant were later added and the name of the factory was changed to The Mysore Iron and Steel Works. In 1939, the Shimoga-Talguppa railway line was laid, using wood from the Malnad forests were transported to this plant, to be used as a fuel in its furnaces. In 1952, two electric pig-iron surfaces were installed in the company, thereby making VISL the first iron and steel company in India to use electricity in the smelting of iron ore. In 1962, the name was changed to The Mysore Iron and Steel Limited and the factory was converted into a Government company jointly owned by the Government of India and the Government of Karnataka with an equity share ratio of 40:60 respectively. The year 1962 also saw the establishment of a new steel plant which could produce steel using the relatively new L D Process. In order to honour its founder, the company was renamed as Visvesvaraya Iron and Steel Limited in 1975. In 1989, it was taken over by the Steel Authority of India as a subsidiary entity and in 1998, VISL was merged into SAIL.

== Financials ==
In the initial years, pig-iron was the main product manufactured here and its production was increased from 4,817 tonnes in 1923 to 20,321 tonnes in 1935. But the increased production could not be turned into a profit-making business and except for the years 1928 and 1929, the company encountered losses during this period. However, the company recovered in the coming years, making a turnover of Rs. 173.13 lakhs and a profit of Rs. 32.21 lakhs in the year 1951. In 1962, the company had a sales turnover of Rs. 638.09 lakhs, earning a profit of Rs. 48.3 lakhs. However, by the year 1970, the company had run into losses, only to recover in the year 1972 to make a profit of Rs. 24.13 lakhs. Mounting losses made SAIL to think of disinvesting VISL and there was also a proposal that it could be taken over by the Indian Defence Ministry since it needed alloy steel, of which VISL was a major producer. However, it remained under SAIL control and encountered a turn around in November 2004 when it started making profits and it has continued to be profitable and has been incurring losses . The losses are in crores for each year

== Raw materials ==
For the first two years (1923–24), the iron ore required by the company was supplied from the limonite deposits at Chattanahalli near Kumsi. From 1924 onwards, mining operations were started at Kemmanagundi and these yielded good quality of iron ore (58-60% iron content). Limestone, which is used as a flux in the steel making process and dolomite which is used as a refractory material were mined from Bandigudda mines, near Bhadravathi. Quartz, used in the manufacture of ferrosilicon and pig iron was mined from Bilikalbetta mines, fire clay used in the manufacture of refractories was mined at Shankaragudda hills and black clay used in the manufacture of cement was mined from Umblebylu fields near Bhadravathi.

== Concerns ==
On 31 July 2003, ten workers in the factory died due to a blast which occurred when leaking water accidentally got mixed with hot molten steel. This questioned the safety measures employed in the plant. It is also alleged that despite employing pollution treatment plants, the effluents discharged from the company is polluting the Bhadra River.
