= Metra potential method =

The metra potential method (MPM) (Méthode des potentiels Métra) is a method used in project management which was developed by French researcher Bernard Roy in 1958 for the construction of the French paquebot and of the first French nuclear power plant.

MPM is a means of describing organizing and planning a project. It is an equivalent of the PERT method.

Using summits for tasks and path for interdependencies between the different tasks, the solution is set are graphically.

Using MPM, the length of the critical path is shown directly in the diagram and the critical path itself can be identified easily.
