= Bhadravati, Karnataka =

City in Karnataka, India

Bhadravati Steel Town
- City
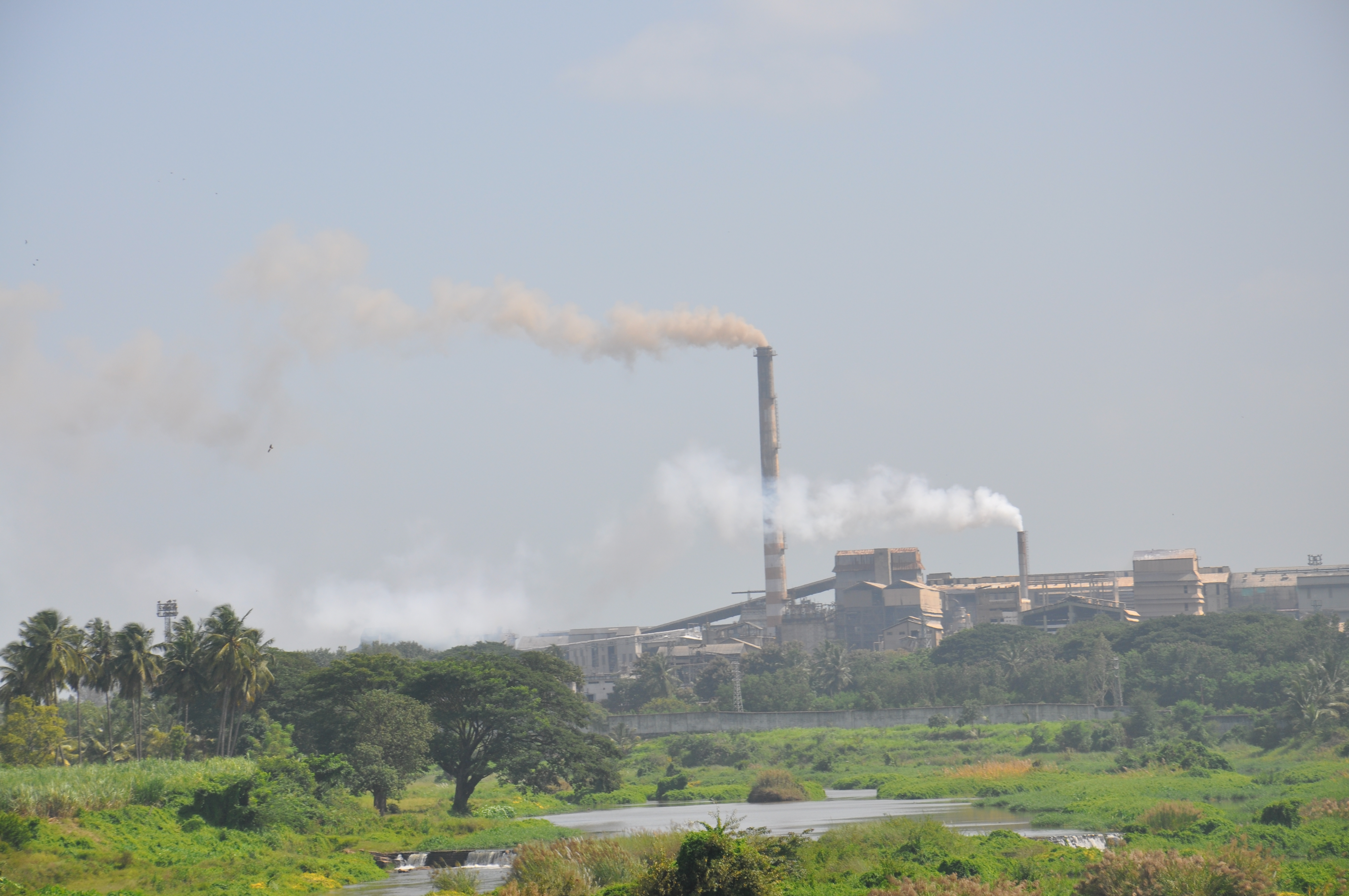
- Nickname: Benkipura
- Location in Karnataka, India
- Coordinates: 13.840°N 75.702°E
- Country: India
- State: Karnataka
- District: Shivamogga
- Region: Malenadu
- Named for: Bhadra River

Government
  - Body: City Municipal Council

Area
  - City: 67.0536 km^{2} (25.8895 sq mi)
  - Rural: 623.35 km^{2} (240.68 sq mi)
- Elevation: 597 m (1,959 ft)

Population (2011)
  - City: 151,102
  - Density: 2,253.45/km^{2} (5,836.41/sq mi)
  - Rural: 188,744

Languages
  - Official: Kannada
- Time zone: UTC+5:30 (IST)
- PIN: 577301, 577302
- Telephone code: +91-8282
- ISO 3166 code: IN-KA
- Vehicle registration: KA-14
- Sex ratio: 1.04 ♂/♀
- Literacy: 87%
- Distance from Bangalore: 255 kilometres (158 mi) NW
- Distance from Shimoga: 20 kilometres (12 mi) E
- Climate: Tropical savanna climate (Köppen)
- Precipitation: 950 millimetres (37 in)
- Avg. summer temperature: 31 °C (88 °F)
- Avg. winter temperature: 25 °C (77 °F)
- Website: bhadravathicity.mrc.gov.in

Bhadravati or Bhadrāvathi is an industrial city or Steel Town and taluk in the Shivamogga District of the Indian state of Karnataka. It is situated at a distance of about 255 kilometres (158 mi) from the state capital Bengaluru and at about 20 kilometres (12 mi) from the district headquarters, Shivamogga. The town is spread over an area of 67.0536 square kilometres (25.8895 sq mi) and has a population of 151,102 as per the census held in 2011.

== History ==
Bhadravati derives its name from the Bhadra River which flows through the city. It was earlier known as Benkipura, which in English means "city of fire", and earlier Benki Pattana'. At some point in history, it was probably also known as Venkipura ('venki' means 'turn' in Sanksrit), as it is situated at the place where Bhadra river takes a 90 degree turn to the west, and then to the east. Hoysalas ruled the city. The Goddess "Haladammadevi & Antaragattammadevi" have guarded the city since past time. The sacred temples are still present in the city.

In 1413, Yerelakka nayaka (ಎರೆಲಕ್ಕನಾಯಕ) who was ruling the two cities called Dumma and Banuru (ದುಮ್ಮ, ಬಾಣೂರು), built two more cities, after clearing some of the wild forest, and named them, Narasimha Pura and Lakshmipura. Subsequently, these two cities became Benkipura or Venkipura and then Bhadravathi, as it is situated on the banks of Bhadra river.

Iron ore from the hill station of Kemmannugundi and water from the Bhadra River helped the establishment of an iron mill in 1918 Known as Mysore Iron and Steel Limited (MISL). Bhadravathi's reputation as an industrial town was further enhanced with the establishment of a paper manufacturing firm, the Mysore Paper Mills Limited in 1936.

== Demographics ==
Based on the 2011 Indian census, Bhadravati has a population of 160,392, of which males constitute 51% and females 49%. Bhadravati has an average literacy rate of 86.36%, higher than the national average of 59.5%; with 91.39% of the males and 81.46% of the females literate. 10% of the population is under 6 years of age. Kannada is the main language spoken in this city.

Languages of Bhadravati
1. Kannada (75.9%)
2. Urdu (10.4%)
3. Tamil (5.56%)
4. Telugu (2.53%)
5. Marathi (1.30%)
6. Hindi (2.48%)
7. Malayalam (1.65%)
8. Others (0.12%)

== Geography ==
=== Location ===
Bhadravati lies in the central part of the Karnataka State, in the south-east corner of the Shivamogga district. The latitude and longitude coordinates of Bhadravati town are 13.840°N 75.702°E.

Bhadravati is at an elevation of 597 metres (1,959 ft) above sea level.

The Bhadra River flows from the Bhadra Wildlife Sanctuary through the Bhadravathi city, there are many mugger crocodile(Vulnerable) species present in the river Bhadra.

Bhadravati lies between Western Ghats (Malnad) and AreMalenad region.

The Bhadravati Taluk has a total area of 675.08 square kilometres (260.65 sq mi), a population of 338,611, and a population density of 501.56 inhabitants per square kilometre (1,299.0/sq mi). The taluk borders five other taluks, the Shimoga Taluk to the west, the Honnali Taluk to the north, the Channagiri Taluk to the east, the Tarikere Taluk to the south-east, and the Narasimharajapura Taluk to the south-west.

=== Climate ===
The average temperature in the summer is between 25 °C (77 °F) and 37 °C (99 °F). The average winter temperature is between 20 °C (68 °F) and 30 °C (86 °F). The annual precipitation in the city is around 950 millimetres (37 in).

=== Regional ===
There are 5 hobli headquarters in Bhadravathi:

- Kudligere (ಕೂಡ್ಲಿಗೆರೆ)
- Holehonnuru (ಹೊಳೆಹೊನ್ನೂರು)
- Anaveri (ಆನವೇರಿ)
- Hiruyur (ಹಿರಿಯೂರು)
- Singanamane (ಸಿಂಗನಮನೆ)
- Anjenaya agrahara

== Transport ==
=== Road ===
Two National Highways passes through the city; NH-69(former NH-206) and NH-369 and Two state highways (SH-116) and (SH-65) pass through the city . KSRTC has a bus depot here, under Shivamogga division. Buses that ply from Bangalore to Shivamogga stop at Bhadravati and the entire journey takes around six hours to complete. Interstate buses to Coimbatore, Tirupati, Salem, Tiruvannamalai, Pune etc. are available from Bhadravathi.

=== Rail ===
Bhadravathi lies on Birur-Talaguppa line of Indian Railways. Its station is named after Sir M. Visvesvaraya and belongs to Mysuru Division of South Western Railway Zone. It is well connected by rail to the Bengaluru city.

=== Air ===
The nearest airport is the newest Shivamogga Domestic Airport, around 21 kilometres (13 mi) from Bhadravati and the next nearest airport is at Mangaluru International Airport, around 198 kilometres (123 mi) from Bhadravati. Bengaluru International Airport is at a distance of 275 kilometres (171 mi).

== Economy ==
Bhadravati has two major factories that take up a large part of the city: The Mysore Iron Works, which is now known as Visvesvaraya Iron and Steel Plant factory, started by Nalvadi Krishnaraja Wodeyar along with his Diwan Sir M. Visvesvarayya, and the Mysore Paper Mills factory.

== Tourist Places ==
Bhadravati lies in the border of two Malnad districts Shimoga and Chickmagalur. Major Tourist attractions around the city include;

- Lakshmi Narasimha Temple: The temple built in 13th century in Hoysala architecture situated in the heart of the city.
- Bhadra Dam: Bhadra Dam is situated across Bhadra river which is20 km from the city.
- Bhadra Wildlife Sanctuary: BWS is a protected area and a tiger reserve as part of Project Tiger, located 23 km south of Bhadravathi
- Gondi: Gondi is situated at the foothills of western ghats, Check dam is the major tourist attraction of the place.
- Kenchammanna Gudda and Gangur: situated amidst the western ghats, which is a major tourist attraction in monsoon.

== Sports ==
Vishveshwarayya Iron & Steel Plant Ground is located in Bhadravati. The stadium was built in 1960 and can hold 25,000 spectators. The ground has played host to Ranji Trophy cricket matches on two occasions for home team Karnataka.

== Notable personalities ==
=== Sports ===
- Gundappa Viswanath, cricketer of the Indian cricket team in the 1970s

=== Entertainment ===
- Swarnalatha, singer
- Bharathi Vishnuvardhan, actress
- Doddanna, actor in Kannada film industry, worked at Visvesvaraya Iron and Steel Limited
- S. Narayan, actor and movie director in Kannada film industry
- Asha Bhat, model, actress, beauty pageant and winner of Miss Supranational 2014, organized in Poland
- Raj B Shetty, actor and director in Kannada film industry
- B. Ajaneesh Loknath, film score composer, singer, music director in Kannada film industry
- Manoj Sharma, Voice over artist and Playback singer who works predominantly in the Kanada industry

=== Technology ===
- Bannihatti Parameshwarappa Dakshayani, deputy project manager for the Mars Orbiter Mission at Indian Space Research Organisation Satellite Centre.
- Kiran Mysore, India-Japan cross-border Venture capitalist and Forbes Asia 30 Under 30 Awardee.
