= Chintan Upadhyay =

Indian artist (born 1972)

- चिंतन उपाध्याय
- Born: 18 August 1972 (age 54); Partapur, Rajasthan, India
- Education: Maharaja Sayajirao University of Baroda (BFA, MFA)
- Occupation: Visual artist
- Known for: Painter, artist, sculptor
- Spouse: Hema Hirani (m. 1998–2014; divorce)

Chintan Upadhyay (born 1972) is a contemporary Indian visual artist known for his multidisciplinary practice across painting, sculpture, installation, and socially engaged art. His work frequently explores identity politics, consumer culture, and reproductive technology. He is particularly recognised for his "Designer Baby" series-sculptural forms that reflect on commodification and gender dynamics—which have been widely exhibited and featured in Sotheby's South Asian art auctions, including a 2007 sale in New York.

In 2002, Upadhyay co-founded Sandarbh, a non-profit Contemporary Arts initiative based in Partapur ( a small Village), Rajasthan, designed to bring contemporary art practices intopublic and marginalized spaces. Sandarbh has been recognized in curatorial literature for its role in expanding the scope of site-specific and socially engaged art in India.

In October 2023, a Mumbai sessions court convicted him for criminal conspiracy and abetment in the murder of his estranged wife, Hema Upadhyay. He was acquitted in the related death of her lawyer, Harish Bhambhani, after the court found no direct evidence linking him to that killing and concluded Bhambhani was "in the wrong place at the wrong time." The Supreme Court of India later suspended his sentence and granted bail in September 2024, noting that the case was based solely on circumstantial evidence and there was no allegation of direct involvement in the act.

He began his art career as a painter, but later created sculptures and installations. His best known sculpture project is perhaps the Pet Shop project, which is an ongoing production of a "model baby" for every season, Baby Fetish.

He was awarded the Charles Wallace Foundation Award for Residency in Bristol, UK in 2012.

== Early life ==
Chintan was born on 18 August 1972, in Partapur in Rajasthan, India. He received a BFA degree in 1995, and a MFA degree in 1997, both degrees in painting are from the Faculty of Fine Arts from Maharaja Sayajirao University of Baroda in Vadodara, in Gujarat, India.

He met artist Hema Hirani in 1992, and the couple married in 1998. They settled in Mumbai, and worked together in many art exhibitions. In 2010, they started the process of divorce, which was finalized in 2014.

== Legal Proceedings ==
In December 2015, Upadhyay was accused and arrested in connection with the double murder of his estranged wife Hema Upadhyay and her lawyer Haresh Bhambhani. Their bodies were found in khakhi-coloured cardboard boxes floating in a nullah. He was twice denied bail. In October 2023, he was convicted of murder and sentenced to life in prison by a Dindoshi court. The Supreme Court of India later suspended his sentence and granted bail in September 2024, noting that the case was based solely on circumstantial evidence and there was no allegation of direct involvement in the act.

== Solo shows ==
Following is the list of his solo shows:

- 2010 'Nature God', Sakshi Gallery, Taipei
- 2009–10 'Mistake', Inda Gallery, Budapest
- 2009 'Khatti Mithi', Project at Sakshi Gallery, Mumbai
- 2009 'Iconic Shrine', Jawahar Kala Kendra, Jaipur in collaboration with Roundabout and Gallery Soulflower, Bangkok
- 2008 'Mistake', Aicon Gallery, London
- 2008 'Pet Shop', Ashish Balram Nagpal Galleries, Mumbai
- 2008 'New Indians', Galerie Natalie Seroussi, Paris
- 2008 'Metastasis of Signs – A Walk in the Realm of Manipulated Realities', Gallery Espace, New Delhi
- 2007 'Tentuaa Dabaa Do (Kill Her)', Jawahar Kala Kendra, Jaipur, Rajasthan
- 2006 'I Want To Be An International Artist', Solo Performance, Seoul Art Centre, Korea
- 2006 'Clone Vitthala', Sculptures at Ashish Balram Nagpal Gallery, Mumbai
- 2006 'Maya', Paintings at Ashish Balram Nagpal Gallery, Mumbai
- 2005 'Baar Baar, Har Baar, Kitni Baar?', Installation and Interactive Performance, Sarjan Art Gallery, Vadodara
- 2004 'Conker's', Installation Project, Spike Island, Bristol, UK
- 2004 'Designer Babies', Ashish Balram Nagpal Gallery, Mumbai
- 2003 'New Breed / Hybrid', Jehangir Art Gallery, Mumbai
- 2002 'Commemorative Stamps', Ashish Balram Nagpal Gallery, Mumbai
- 2002 'Commemorative Stamps', Jawahar Kala Kendra, Jaipur
- 2002 'Floating thoughts', Interactive site-specific installation, Brisbane, Australia
- 1999 'So What', The Fine Art Company, Mumbai
- 1998 'This has been done before', Shahjehan Art Gallery, New Delhi
- 1996 'Desirable Objects', Leela Kempenski Art Gallery, Mumbai

== Group shows ==
- 2012 '2 + 2 = 5', The Palette Art Gallery, New Delhi
- 2012 'Looking Back, Looking Forward', Sakshi Gallery, Mumbai
- 2012 'Mapmakers: The Evolution of Contemporary Indian Art', Aicon Gallery, New York
- 2012 'Contemporary: A Selection of Modern and Contemporary Art', presented by Sakshi Gallery at The Park, Chennai
- 2012 'Sightings', Sakshi Gallery, Mumbai
- 2011 'Adbhutam: Rasa in Indian Art', Centre of International Modern Art (CIMA), Kolkata
- 2011 'Skin Deep: The Art of Fibreglass', The Viewing Room, Mumbai
- 2011 'Between Seasons', Gallery Beyond, Mumbai
- 2011 'Love is a 4 Letter Word', Latitude 28, New Delhi
- 2011 'Fabular Bodies: New Narratives in the Art of the Miniature', presented by Harmony Art Foundation at Coomaraswamy Hall, Chhatrapati Shivaji Maharah Vastu Sangrahalaya, Mumbai
- 2011 'Anecdotes', Sakshi Gallery, Mumbai
- 2011 'High-Light', presented by Sakshi Gallery, Mumbai at The Oberoi, Gurgaon
- 2011 'Dolls', Gallery Sumukha, Bangalore
- 2011 'Tech-Cut-Edge-Revelations', Ashna Gallery, New Delhi
- 2010 'Changing Skin', presented by The Fine Art Company at Coomaraswamy Hall, Chattrapati Shivaji Maharaj Vastu Sangrahalay, Mumbai
- 2010 'A. SYCO', The Viewing Room, Mumbai
- 2009 'Home Sweet Home', Religare Arts. i Gallery, New Delhi
- 2009 'Indian Summer', Galerie Christian Hosp, Berlin
- 2009 'Inaugural Show', Sakshi Gallery, Taipei
- 2008–09 'Signs Taken for Wonders: Recent Art from India and Pakistan', Aicon Gallery, London
- 2008–09 'Hot Shots', The Viewing Room, Mumbai
- 2008 'Uncovered', Sans Tache Art Gallery, Mumbai
- 2008 'Keep Drawing', Gallery Espace, New Delhi
- 2008 'The Ethics of Encounter', Gallery Soulflower, Bangkok
- 2008 'Indiavata', Gallery Sun Contemporary, Korea
- 2008 'Link', Sakshi Art Gallery, Mumbai
- 2008 'Freedom 2008 : Sixty Years After Indian Independence', Centre for International Modern Art (CIMA), Kolkata
- 2007 'Telling It Like It Is: The Indian Story', The Gallery in Cork Street, London
- 2007 'Here and Now: Contemporary Voices from India', Grosvenor Gallery, London
- 2007 'Young Guns', Institute of Contemporary Indian Art (ICIA), Mumbai
- 2007 'Keep Drawing', Pundole Art Gallery, Mumbai
- 2006 'Bombay Maximum City', Lille 3000, Lille, France
- 2005 -06 'Kaam', Arts India Gallery, New York and Palo Alto, USA
- 2005 'Annual Exhibition', Sakshi Art Gallery, Mumbai
- 2005 'Indian Contemporary Art', Preview TATE Britain
- 2005 'Configuration', Anant Art Gallery, New Delhi
- 2005 'Ways Of Seeing', Gallery Art Alive, New Delhi
- 2005 'Papereshi', Sarjan Art Gallery, Vadodara
- 2005 'Present-Future', National Gallery of Modern Art (NGMA), Mumbai
- 2005 'Indian Contemporary Art', Chelsea College of Art, London
- 2005 'Are We Like This Only?', Rabindra Bhavan, Vadhera Art Gallery, New Delhi
- 2004 'Bombay Boys', Palette Art Gallery, New Delhi
- 2004 'Charles Wallace Foundation Awards', British Council, New Delhi
- 2004 'Concepts and Ideas', Centre for International Modern art (CIMA), Kolkata
- 2004 Gallery 27, Oslo, Norway
- 2004 – 03 'Portraits of a Decade', Centre for International Modern art (CIMA), Kolkata and Jehangir Art Gallery, Mumbai
- 2004 – 03 'Dots and Pixels', Digital media, Sumukha Art Gallery, Bangalore and Gallery Espace, New Delhi
- 2004 'Bombay 17', Kashi Art Gallery, Kochi
- 2003 'Parthenogenesis', Ivan Dougherty Gallery, Sydney, Australia
- 2003 'Corresponding Latitudes', A Cross Cultural Collaborative Exhibition of Indian and Australian artists, Jawahar Kala Kendra – Jaipur
- 2002 ' Brahma to Bapu', Icons and Symbols in Indian art, Habitat centre, New Delhi, India and Centre for International Modern art (CIMA), Kolkata
- 2002 'Quotable Stencil', Tao Art Gallery, Mumbai
- 2001 ' Annual show', Gallery Wren, Sydney, Australia
- 2000 'Sic.', an Audio-visual Installation, The Fine Art Company, Mumbai
- 1999 'Mumbai Metaphor' Tao Art Gallery, Mumbai
- 1999 'Wall Paper', Lakeeren Art Gallery, Mumbai
- 1997 'Class of 1997', Lakeeren Art Gallery, Mumbai
- 1997 '50 yr. of Indian Independence', All India Fine Arts and Crafts Society, Delhi and Ravi Shankar Rawal Bhavan, Ahmedabad – Gujarat

== Joint shows ==
- 2005 'You Have to Decide' an Interactive Installation and Performance Center for Art and Culture, Chiksarda, Transylvania, Romania
- 2005 'I'm a Slut', a collaborative video and performance with Amit Kekre, Gallery Beyond, Mumbai
- 2004 'Made in China', collaborative installation with Hema Upadhyay, Viart Gallery, New Delhi
- 2003 'Made in China', collaborative Installation with Hema Upadhyay, Gallery Chemould, Mumbai
- 2003 'Post Card', project with Hema Upadhyay, part of 'Parthenogenesis', Ivan Dougherty Gallery, Sydney
- 2000 Objects of Desire, collaboration with Hema Upadhyay, 'Art and Technology', Ideas and Images II, National Gallery of Modern Art (NGMA), Mumbai
- 1995 'Circa Early Seventies', Faculty of Fine Arts, Maharaja Sayajirao University, Vadodara
- 1994 'Discount 33%', Faculty of Fine Arts, Maharaja Sayajirao University, Vadodara

== Honours and awards ==
- 2004–05 Charles Wallace Foundation Award for a residency in Bristol, UK
- 2000–01 Gadi scholarship, NLKA, New Delhi
- 1998 Lalit Kala Academy for Outstanding Drawing in a drawing exhibition
- 1997 All India Avantika art exhibition, New Delhi
- 1996 Lalit Kala Academy for Outstanding Painting in the annual exhibition S.C.Z.C.C. for Outstanding Painting in the annual exhibition, Nagpur, Maharashtra
- 1995–97 Lalit Kala Academy for Outstanding Painting in the annual exhibition
