= Sayajirao Road =

Road in Mysore, India

Coordinates: 12.311035586078425°N 76.65237304759924°E

Sayyajirao Road
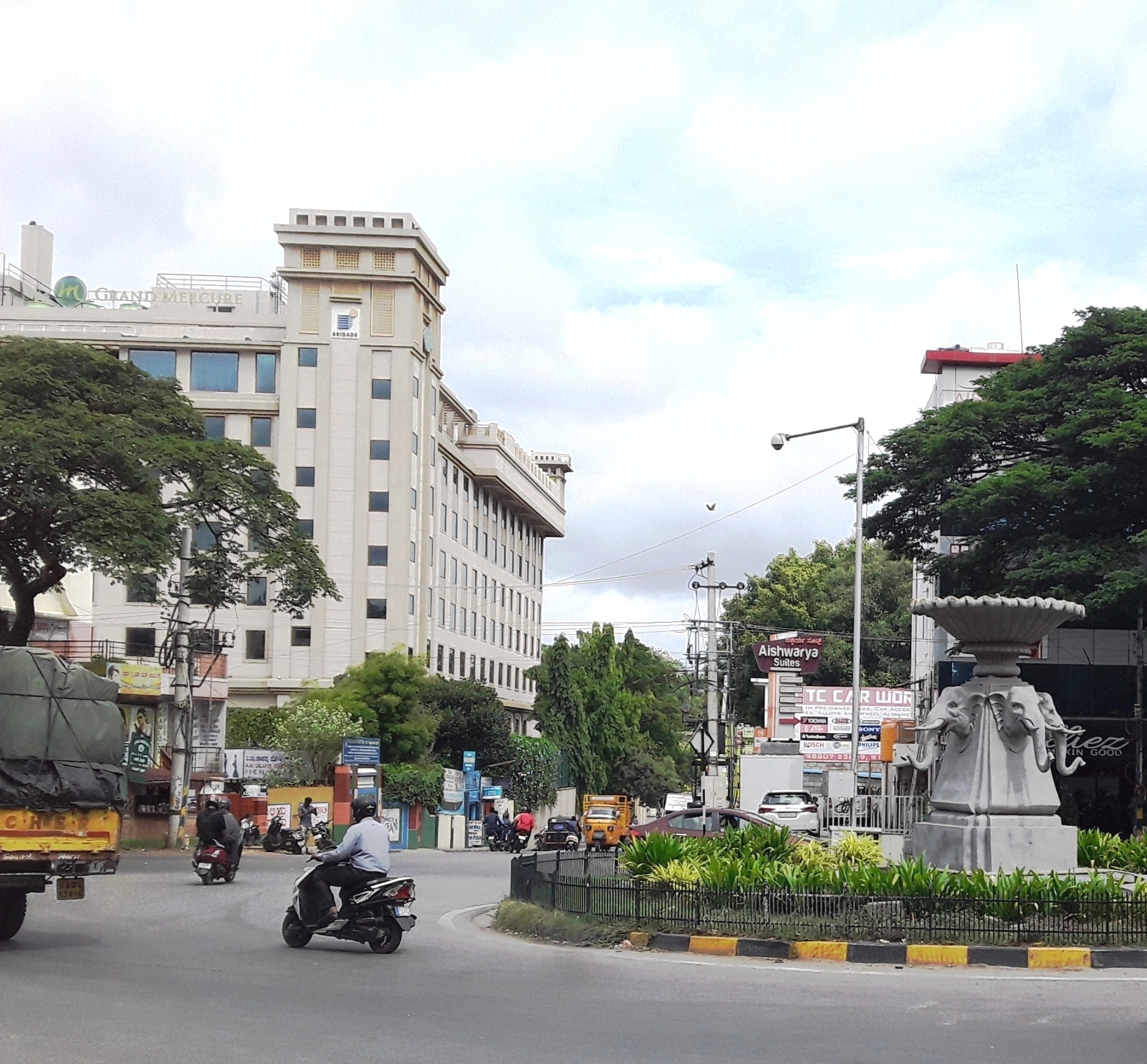
- Highway Circle in Bannimantap where Sayajirao Road terminates
- Namesake: Maharaja Sayajirao Gaekwad III
- Owner: Mysore City Corporation
- North: Agrahara Circle
- South: Highway Circle

Sayyajirao Road, also known as Sayyaji Rao Road, is a road in Mysore, India stretching in the north from Agrahara circle at one end to Highway circle at the other. This road was named after Maharaja Sayajirao Gaekwad by Maharaja Chamaraja Wodayar X in 1893.

== History ==
Both then-yuvarajas (princes) Chamaraja Wodayar X and Sayajirao Gaekwad were good friends. The two leaders were both adopted by a reigning king in their respective kingdoms and went on to become famous maharajas of those realms themselves.

In 1888, Sayajirao Gaekwad named the road leading to the Lakshmi Vilas Palace, Vadodara through Gate-2 as Chamaraja Road. It is now one of the busiest roads in the city and is lined on one side with retail stores, food outlets, restaurants and many more. It has many office buildings, banks, shops and markets. Khanderao Market, which hosts the offices of Vadodara Municipal Corporation and the famous city landmark Kirti Stambh are both located along this road.

In late 1893, when Sayajirao Gaekwad visited Mysore, a road neighbouring Mysore Palace was named Sayajirao Road . Historically, along the present-day road, a canal was constructed from Kaveri River to Mysore Palace in the 1850s to meet water consumption demands of the city of Mysore. The project failed, and the open ditch canal gradually turned into an unhygienic drainage spreading diseases. Eventually, the stretch was filled up and converted into a modern thoroughfare. Subsequently, the road became the Mysore Dasara procession route during Vijayadasami, replacing the congested commercial centre of Doddapete (present-day Ashoka Road, Mysore).
