= Maharaja Sayajirao University of Baroda =

Public university in Vadodara, Gujarat, India

Coordinates: 22.3099°N 73.1860°E

The Maharaja Sayajirao University of Baroda
- Former name: Baroda College
- Motto: Satyam Shivam Sundaram (Sanskrit)
- Motto in English: Truth is eternally beautiful
- Type: State university
- Established: 1881; 145 years ago
- Accreditation: NAAC Grade A+
- Affiliations: UGC, BCI, AICTE
- Chancellor: Rajmata Shubhangini Raje Gaekwad
- Vice-Chancellor: Bhalchandra M. Bhanage
- Students: 47,000+
- Location: Vadodara, Gujarat, India
- Campus: 275 acres (111 ha); Urban
- Language: English
- Website: msubaroda.ac.in

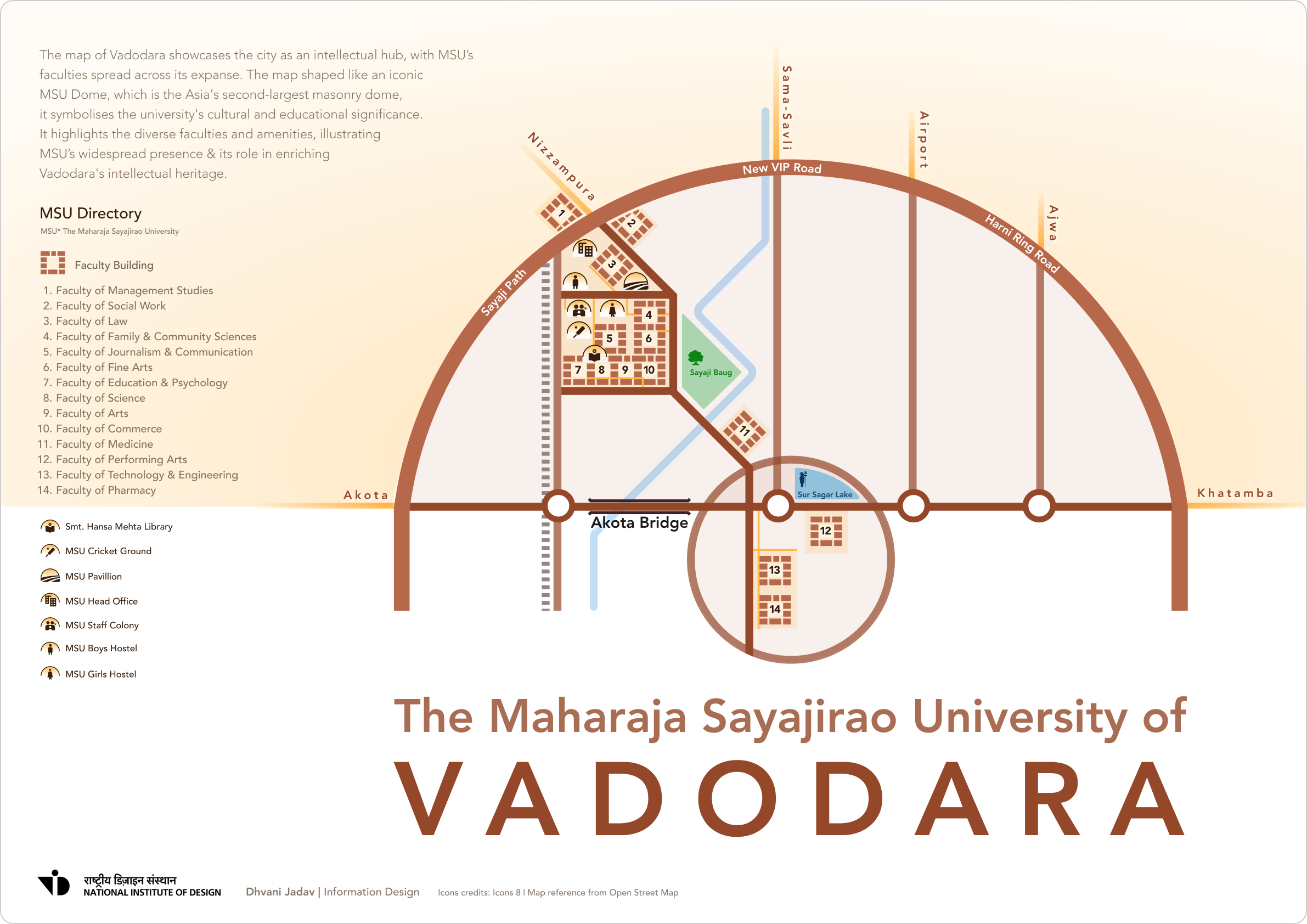
The schematic map of MSU Vadodara highlights the university as an intellectual centre by positioning all its faculties within the context of the city of Vadodara.

The Maharaja Sayajirao University of Baroda is a public university in the city of Vadodara, Gujarat, India. Originally established as a Baroda college in 1881, it became a public university on April 30, 1949 and was renamed after its benefactor Maharaja Sayajirao Gaekwad III, the former ruler of Baroda State.

The university offers undergraduate, postgraduate, and doctoral programs. It houses 89 departments spread over 6 campuses (2 rural and 4 urban) covering 275 acres of land.

== History ==
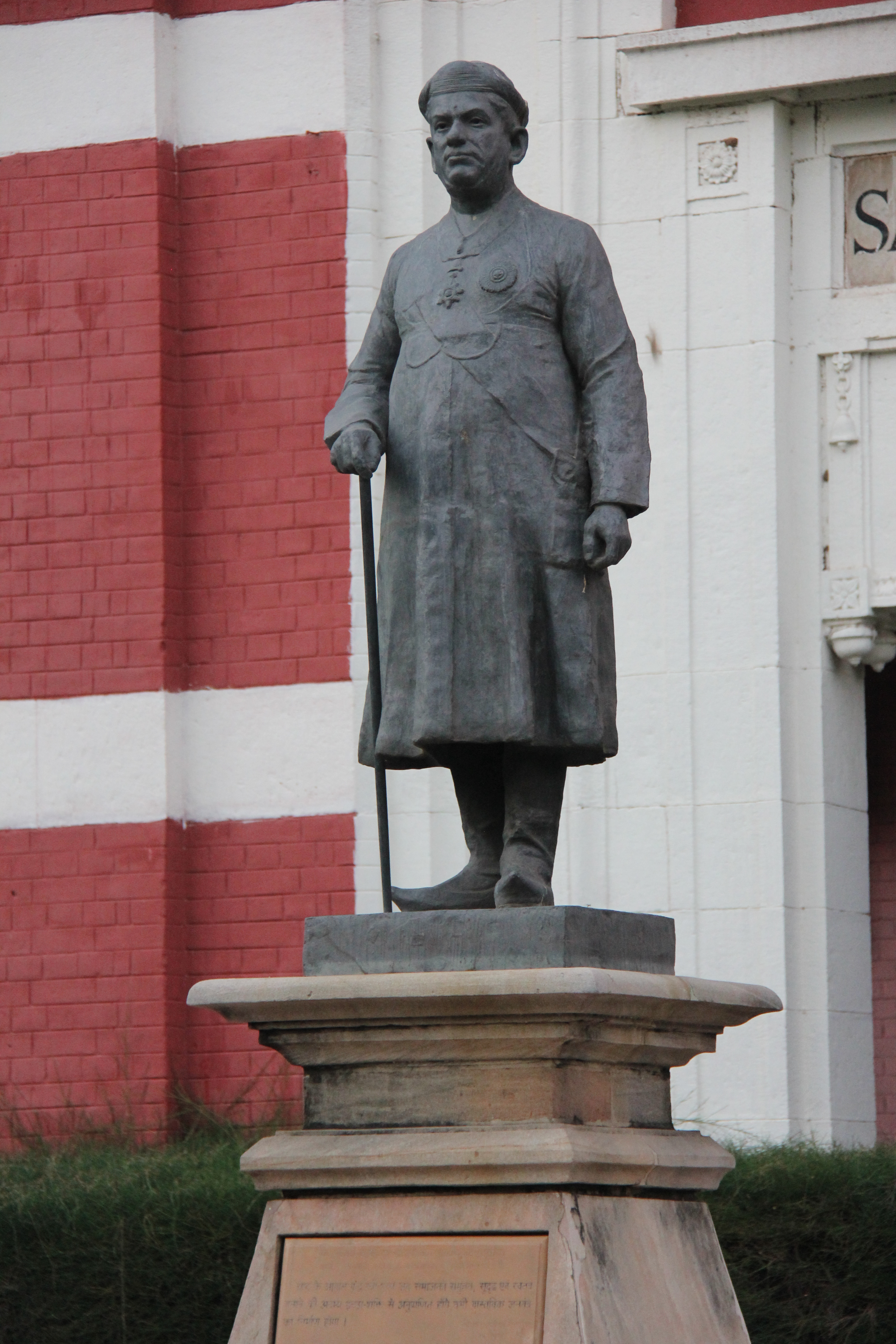
Statue of Sayajirao Gaekwad III in the university campus.

The university has its origins in the Baroda College, established in 1881 by Baroda State. The main building, which houses the Faculty of Arts, was designed by Robert Fellowes Chisholm in Indo-Saracenic architecture style, in a fusion of Indian and Byzantine arches and domes in brick and polychrome stone. The main dome on the convocation hall was modelled after the great dome of the Gol Gumbaz in Bijapur.

Pratap Singh Gaekwad of Baroda, the last Maharaja of the erstwhile Baroda State, founded the university in 1949 on the wishes of his grandfather, Maharaja Sayajirao Gaekwad III, and settled the Sir Sayajirao Diamond Jubilee and Memorial Trust, which caters to the education and other needs of people of the former Baroda State.

== Faculty of Education and Psychology ==
This faculty is established for the development of teachers of child psychology. Its departments include:

- Department of Education (CASE)
- Department of Psychology
- Department of Educational Administration

The Department of Education was established in 1935, having formerly been a teacher training college. The department was originally named the Center of Advance Study in Education Baroda.

== Faculty of Science ==
The old Baroda College founded in 1881 consisted of Arts and Science faculties. The Faculty of Science started its independent existence in March 1951 with Dr C.S. Patel as its first dean. The Old Building which houses the Faculty of Science was completed in about 1934 in the reign of Sayajirao Gaekwad III. It is conspicuous by its small copper dome and is flanked on the west by the building of the Faculty of Education and Psychology and on the east by the majestic building of the Old Baroda College, now the Faculty of Arts.

=== Departments ===
- Department of Biochemistry
- Department of Botany
- Department of Chemistry
- Department of Computer Applications
- Department of Environmental Studies
- Department of Geography
- Department of Geology
- Department of Mathematics
- Department of Microbiology
- Department of Physics
- Department of Statistics
- Department of Zoology
- Dr. Vikram Sarabhai Institute of Cell and Molecular Biology

=== Department of Physics ===
The department, established in 1949, offers U.G., P.G., and PhD programme and is a sponsored department of Science and Technology, Government of India under FIST programme. In MSc, students are offered Solid State Physics, Electronics and Communication, Nuclear Physics, and Molecular Spectroscopy as specialization. The department is also equipped by two of the oldest and famous observatories: (i) Astronomical Observatory and (ii) Meteorological observatory.

Researchers are provided with advanced technologies including FTIR-4100 Spectrometer, Thermal Analyser (DSC), AFM, Workstations-4, Cluster Computing facility (Supercomputer), etc. which help them in researching on Condensed Matter Physics, Material Science, Experimental Nuclear Physics, Spectroscopy, Theoretical Particle Physics, and Astrophysics.

It is one of the oldest Physics departments in India, which adopted advanced curricula based on Courses viz, Berkeley Physics Course, Feynman Lecture Series, etc. under the leadership of S.K. Shah and H.S. Desai. Department has an active society, notably 'The Physical Society MSU Baroda'. Department of Condensed Matter Physics has been sponsored for researches in coordination with TIFR and BARC by DST-FIST as a major beneficiary. Department is indulged in a number of active researches with record endowments. The university holds the accolade of having worldwide spread Departmental alumni, including Nobel Laureate cum President, Royal Society, Venkatraman Ramakrishnan.

J.S. Bandukwala, a prominent human rights activist was a long time associate professor in this department.

=== Dr. Vikram Sarabhai Institute of Cell and Molecular Biology ===
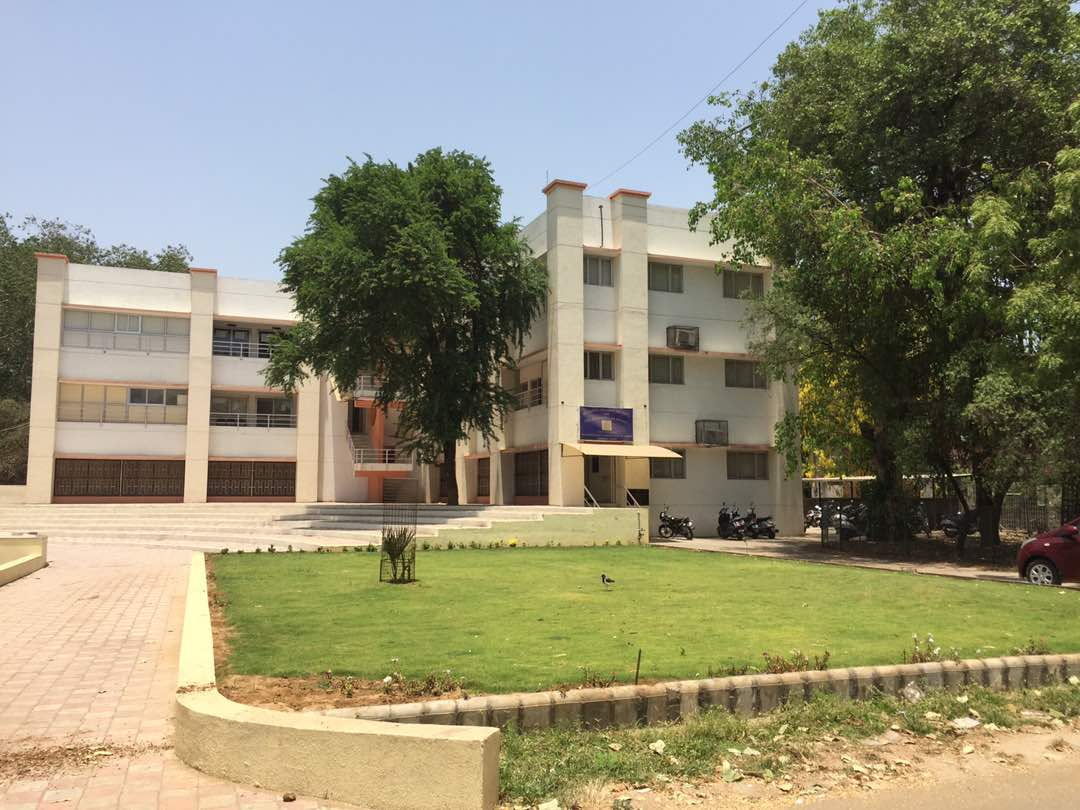
Dr. Vikram Sarabhai Institute of Cell and Molecular Biology

Established in 2012, Dr. Vikram Sarabhai Institute of Cell and Molecular Biology is an interdisciplinary research institute that integrates several departments of the Faculty of Science. The centre was established with the financial support of the Government of Gujarat. The institute started a 5-year Integrated MSc programme in Cell and Molecular Biology in 2012. The course offers 30 seats each year, which are filled through a common entrance exam.

=== Department of Computer Applications ===
Formally established in 2013, the department offers three programmes, Bachelor of Computer Applications (BCA), MSc in Information Technologies and MSc in Software Technologies.

=== Department of Biochemistry ===
The Department of Biochemistry was established in 1955, under the Chemistry Department, and was headed by Prof. C.V. Ramakrishnan, father of 2009 Chemistry Nobel Laureate Venkatraman Ramakrishnan). The department was awarded an Excellent status in 2006 by FIST, a Government of India accreditation agency. The department was funded under the DST-FIST I programme under which equipments have been purchased and infrastructure facilities strengthened. The department has received support from UGC-DRS, UGC-DSA, and COSIST programs.

The department offers three programs, viz. MSc. (BioChemistry), MSc. in Medical Biotechnology (a Higher Payment Program introduced in 2007) and Ph.D. At any given time, it has about 35–40 research students actively pursuing a Ph.D. and approximately 100 MSc. students (roughly 50 in each year of the two-year program). The Biochemistry Department offers courses in enzymology, genetics, molecular biology, neuroscience, plant biochemistry, endocrinology, clinical biochemistry among others. The department conducts research in areas including bacterial cooperation, polyketide synthase clusture, antibiotic resistance, Apoptosis, phosphate solubilisation, nitrogen fixation, probiotics, heavy metal toxicity, diabetes, prostate cancer, female infertility, endophytes, magnetoliposomes, protein folding, and vitiligo.

The areas of research in which the department is engaged are Molecular Biology and Genetic Engineering, Microbiology, Bioprocess Engineering, and Immunology, Biophysics. It also offers Postgraduate diploma in applied biochemistry.

== Faculty of Performing Arts ==
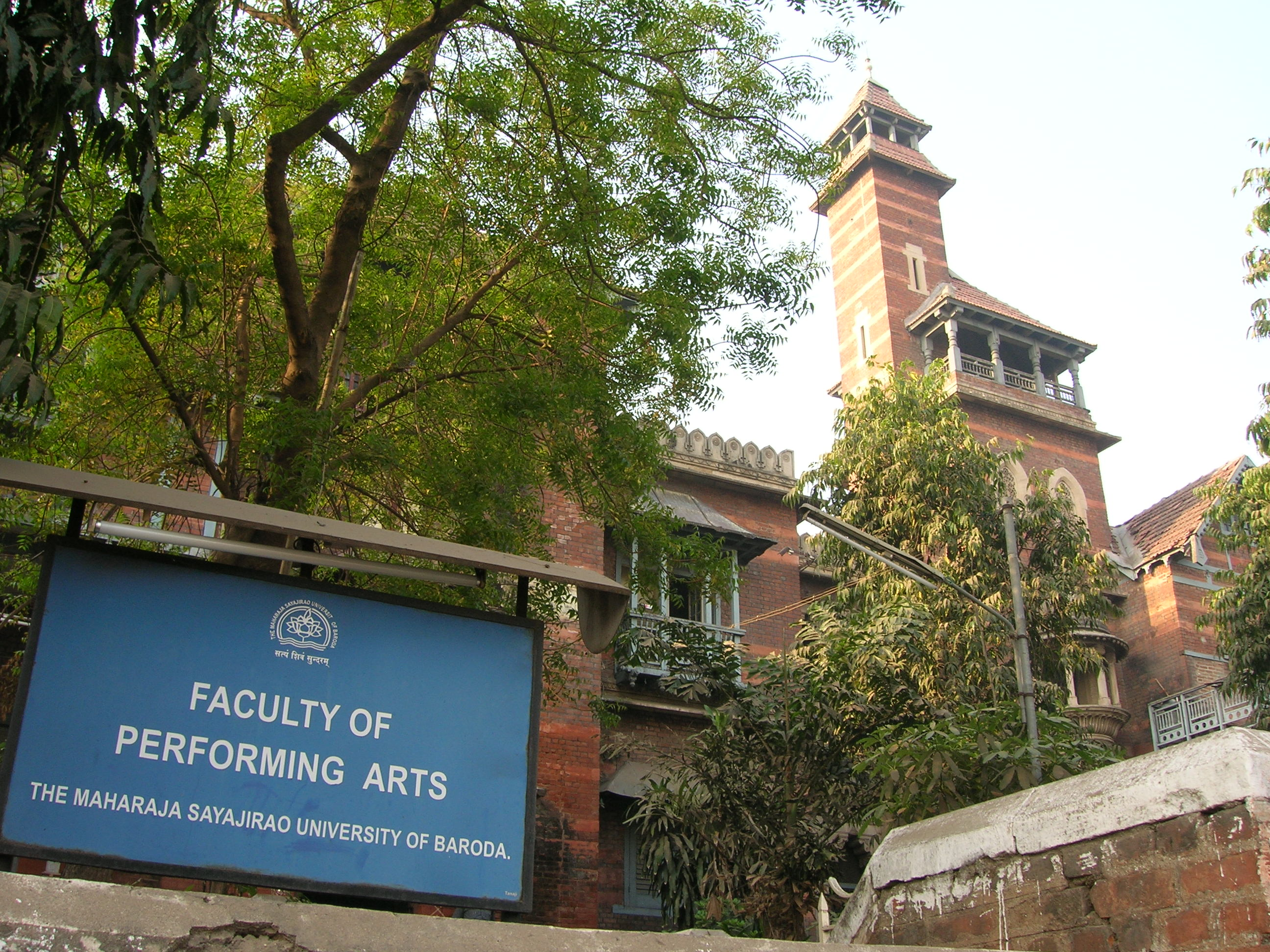
Faculty of Performing Arts building

=== Classical music ===
Maharaja Sayajirao Rao Gaekwad was a patron of Indian classical music. ustad Moula Bux founded the Academy of Indian Music under the patronage of Sayajirao, on 26 February 1886. This academy later became the Music College and is now the Faculty of Performing Arts of The Maharaja Sayajirao University of Baroda. Apart from Moula Bux, Sayajirao's Court boasted of artists like Ustad Inayat Khan and legendary Agra Gharana Aftaab e Mousiqui (Sun of Music) Ustad Faiyyaz Khansaheb

After educationist Vishnu Narayan Bhatkhande's music curriculum was introduced at the college, Gayanacharya Madhusudan Joshi became the first recipient of a diploma in Music (1932) in the history of music education in India.

=== Dance ===
The MSU started the first dance programme in India in 1950.

In 1880, the Maharani Chimnabai I of Tanjore was married to Baroda's Maharaja Sayajirao III Gopalrao Gaekwad, a prince who established the Baroda College as one of his first public acts. It was later absorbed into the university that bears his name. Chimnabai I was knowledgeable in Bharatanatyam and Carnatic music and brought a troupe with her: two dancers, two nattuvanars (leaders of Bharatanatyam concerts), and two teachers. Others followed: Nattuvanar Appaswamy and his dancer wife Kantimati, who had studied with Kannusamy and Vadively, two members of the Tanjore Quartet. After Appaswamy's death in 1939, Kantimati and their son, Kubernath, left to teach in Lucknow and worked in film in South India until Maharaja Pratap Singhrao Gaekwad called the Tanjorkars family back to Baroda in 1949, to teach in the music department in the Palace Kalavan which was later absorbed into MSU.

== Faculty of Arts ==
Faculty of Arts MSU

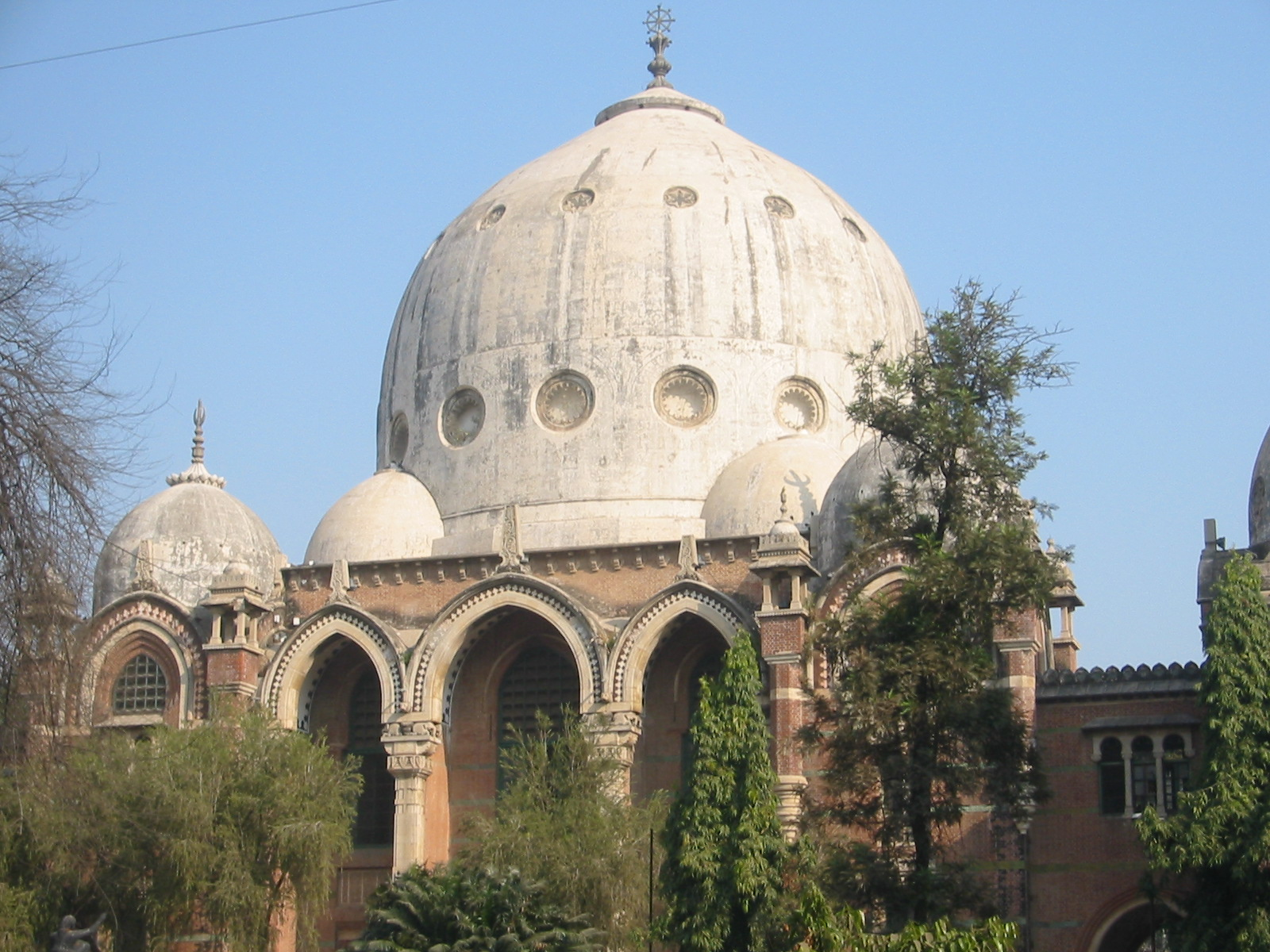
Faculty of Arts Dome, designed by Robert Fellowes Chisholm (1840–1915) in Indo-Saracenic style, modelled on Gol Gumbaz

The Faculty of Arts building is known for its Gumbaz (The Dome) which has been modelled on the 'Gol Gumbaz' of Bijapur and has often been rated as the finest dome for Educational Institutions in India.

=== Departments ===
- Department of Archaeology and Ancient History
- Department of Anthropology
- Department of Arabic
- Department of Canadian Studies
- Department of Defence and National Security Studies
- Department of Economics
- Department of English (The oldest in Gujarat)
- Department of French
- Department of Geography
- Department of German
- Department of Gujarati
- Department of Hindi
- Department of History
- Department of International Relation
- Department of Journalism & Communication
- Department of Library & Information Science
- Department of Linguistics
- Department of Marathi
- Department of Persian
- Department of Philosophy
- Department of Political Science
- Department of Pali
- Department of Prakrit
- Department of Russian
- Department of Sanskrit
- Department of Sindhi
- Department of Sociology
- Department of Traditional Sanskrit Studies
- Department of Urdu
- Department of Management Studies
- Department of Education and Psychology

== Faculty of Management Studies ==
Popularly known as FMS Baroda, was established in 1984 in the city of Vadodara. The courses are approved by All India Council for Technical Education. The institute offers the specialization in Marketing, Finance, Human Resource Management and Information Systems. During 1995, it increased its intake from 30 to 40 for 2-year full-time (regular) MBA, and in 1997 introduced a 3-Year MBA Evening Programme.

== Faculty of Medicine ==
The Baroda Medical College serves as the Faculty of Medicine. Attached with the Sir Sayajirao General (SSG) Hospital, Faculty of Medicine is considered amongst the top Medical Colleges of Gujarat. Started in 1949, today it has a batch of 250 MBBS Students per year and more than 400+ Post graduate students in various MD & MS Residency programmes. GMERS Medical College & Hospital, Gotri has also been given affiliation of Faculty of Medicine, MSUB

== Faculty of Pharmacy ==
The Faculty of Pharmacy was established in 2015. Prior to that, it was a department under the Faculty of Technology and Engineering. Prof M R Yadav is the founder dean of Faculty of Pharmacy.

== library ==
The Hansa Mehta Library was established in 1950. This library is considered to be one of the biggest and the richest libraries of India. Approximately 3,500 books are preserved in this collection, which includes some noteworthy titles that are out of print. The library contains 6,31,735 volumes (including bound journals).

== Oriental Institute ==
The institute was established in Baroda on 1 September 1927. It operated from the Central Library before it was shifted to a separate building near the palace. It is known for the seven volumes of the critical edition of Ramayana that it published between 1951 and 1975, a part of a 25-year project sponsored by the University Grants Commission (UGC). The text was later the reference source for Ramayan, the popular TV series by Ramanand Sagar that originally ran in 1987–88.

One of the oldest manuscripts preserved at the institute is Ayodhya Mahatmya, written by Harishankar in 1656 AD, part of the collection of over 10,000 manuscripts of Maharaja Sayajirao Gaekwad III, who first conceptualized the institute in 1893, inspired by the opening of the Oriental Research Institute Mysore in 1891, established by then Maharaja of Mysore Chamaraja Wodeyar, and a close friend. A road was named after as Chamaraja Road in Vadodara and Sayajirao Road in Mysore to embark the friendship between Maharaja Sayajirao Gaekwad III and Chamaraja Wodeyar. Chamaraja Road starts from Eastern gate of Lakshmi Vilas Palace and has the prominent landmarks like Kirti Stambh, Khanderao Market and others before terminating near Bhagat Singh Chowk.

The Oriental Institute organizes seminars and conferences for research in Oriental studies.

== Rankings ==
University rankings

General – international
- QS (Asia) (2023): 701–750
- Times (Asia) (2022): 501+
- Times (Emerging) (2022): 501+

General – India
- NIRF (Universities) (2023): 101-150

Engineering – India
- NIRF (2023): 151-200

Pharmacy – India
- NIRF (2024): 44

Internationally, the university was ranked 701–750 in Asia on the QS World University Rankings of 2023. It was ranked 501+ in Asia by the Times Higher Education World University Rankings of 2022 and in the same band among emerging economies. The NIRF ranked the university 44th in its 2024 pharmacy rankings. It also ranked 101-150 band in the university rankings and 151-200 band in the engineering rankings.

== Student life ==
The university offers NCC and NSS on campus.

=== Sayaji FM ===
Sayaji FM is the online radio station of The Maharaja Sayajirao University of Baroda.

== Notable people ==
=== Notable alumni ===
- Abhiram Radhakrishnan
- Ajay Bhatt
- Aniruddh Brahmabhatt
- Avinash Sachdev
- Babu Suthar
- Dadasaheb Phalke
- C. M. Prasad
- Gulam Mohammed Sheikh
- Hemlata Talesra
- Jagannath Panda
- Jay Pinak Oza
- Manan Desai
- Nandita Kumar
- Prateek Sharma
- Rajesh S. V.
- Rang Avadhoot
- Reetika Khera
- Sam Pitroda
- Shankar Subbanarasayya Mantha
- Shrenu Parikh
- T. V. Santhosh
- Venkatraman Ramakrishnan
- Vijay Bhatkar
- Vijayakumar Menon
- Vinoba Bhave

=== Faculty ===
- M. N. Srinivas
- Rajni Kothari
- Jyotsna Bhatt
- Syed Mujtaba Ali
