= Hema Upadhyay =

Indian visual artist (1972–2015)

- हेमा उपाध्याय
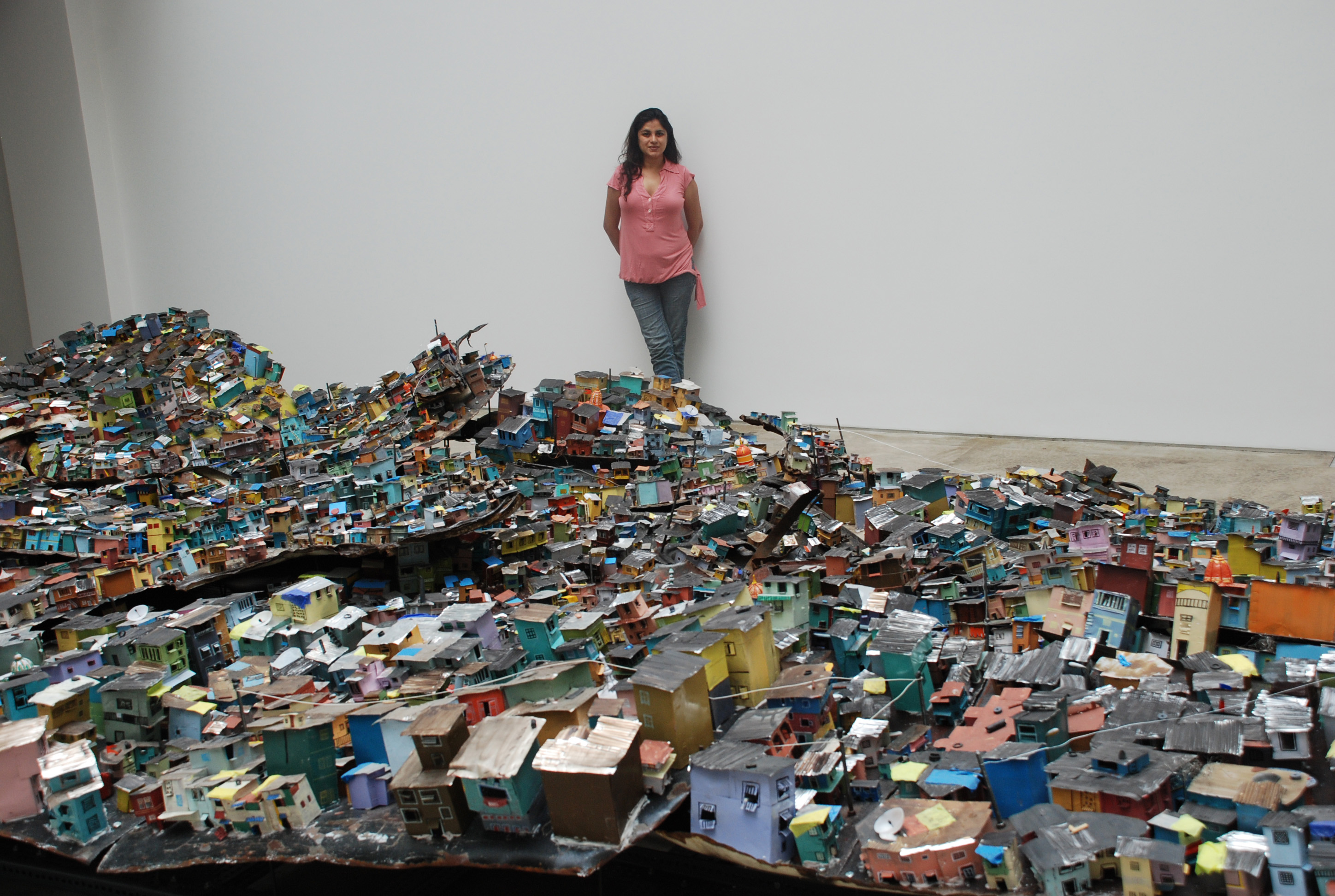
- Upadhyay with Dream a wish-wish a dream, 2006
- Born: Hema Hirani; 18 May 1972; Vadodra, Gujarat, India
- Died: 11 December 2015 (aged 43); Mumbai, Maharashtra, India
- Education: Maharaja Sayajirao University of Baroda (BFA, MFA)
- Occupation: Visual artist
- Years active: 1998–2015
- Known for: Photography, installation art
- Spouse: Chintan Upadhyay (m. 1998–2014; divorced)

Hema Upadhyay (born Hema Hirani; 18 May 1972 – 11 December 2015) was an Indian visual artist, based in Mumbai. She was known for photography and sculptural installations. She was active from 1998 until her death in 2015.

== Early life and marriage ==
Born Hema Hirani on May 18, 1972, in Vadodra, Gujarat, India. She graduated from Maharaja Sayajirao University of Baroda with a BFA degree in 1995 in painting, and a MFA degree in 1997 in printmaking.

She met her future husband and fellow artist Chintan Upadhyay in 1992. The couple married in 1998, and settled in Mumbai. They worked together in many exhibitions, before filing for a divorce in 2010. They were officially divorced in 2014. Chintan then moved to Delhi; she lived in their flat on the Juhu-Tara road.

== Early works ==
Hema had her first solo exhibition, titled Sweet Sweat Memories, at Gallery Chemould, now Chemould Prescott road (Mumbai), in 2001. The exhibition consisted of mixed media on paper works. In these works she has incorporated her own photographs to communicate her ideas of migration having moved to Bombay in 1998. Hema's paintings were usually characterised by the inclusion of small-collaged photographic self-portraits.

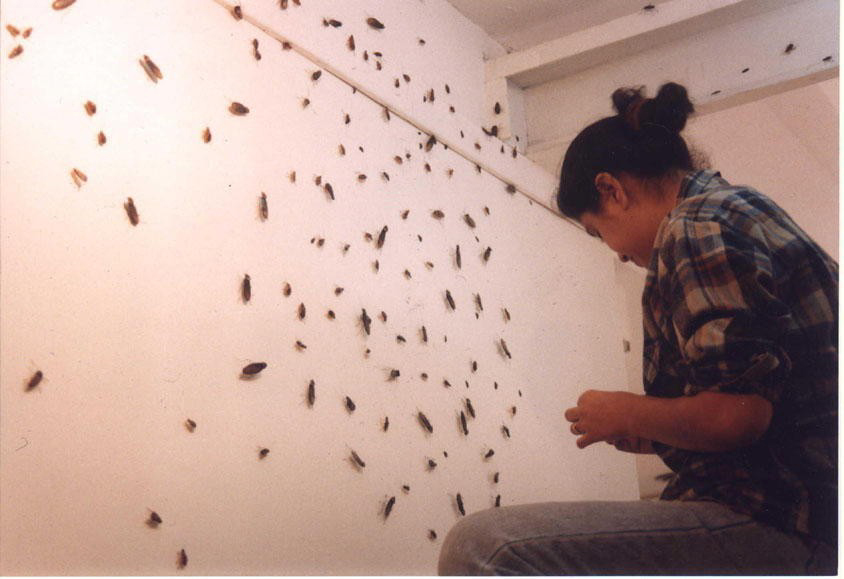
The Nymph and the Adult, Installation, 2001, Artspace, Sydney, Australia

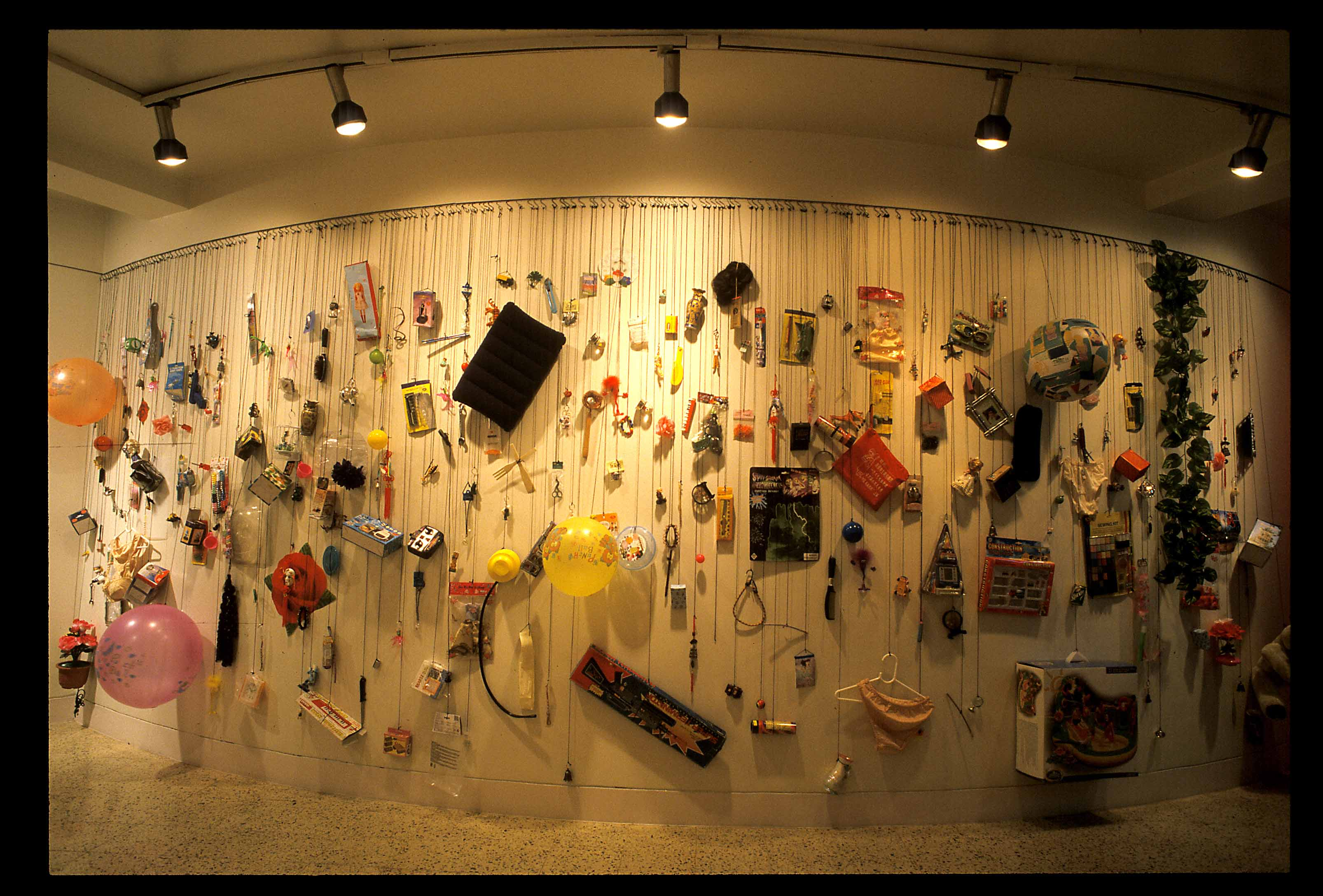
Made in China, Collaborative installation, 2003, Gallery Chemould, Mumbai, India

In 2001 Hema had her first international solo at Artspace, Sydney, and Institute of Modern Art, Brisbane, Australia, where she exhibited an installation titled The Nymph and the Adult (also exhibited at the 10th International Triennial – India held in New Delhi) she hand sculpted 2000 lifelike cockroaches, infesting the gallery with them. The work was intended to make viewers think about the consequences of military actions.

In collaboration with Chintan Upadhyay, she did a work titled Made in China, which spoke about mass consumerism, globalisation and a loss of identity through this. Her next collaboration was in 2006 when she collaborated with her mother, Bina Hirani, the work was titled Mum-my and was shown at the Chicago Cultural Centre.

== Museum exhibitions ==
From 2004 onwards, Hema Upadhyay came up with installations that were part of various group shows at the Ullens Center for Contemporary Art Beijing, China; National Portrait Gallery Canberra, Australia; Centre Pompidou, Paris, France; Museum on the Seam, Jerusalem, Israel; MACRO museum, Rome, Italy; IVAM, Valencia, Spain; Mart Museum, Italy; Mori Art Museum, Tokyo, Japan; Hanger Bicocca, Milan, Italy; Chicago Cultural Centre, Chicago, USA; Ecole Nationale Superieure des Beaux Arts, Paris, France; Fukuoka Asian Art Museum, Fukuoka, Japan; Japan Foundation, Tokyo and the Henie Onstad Kunssenter, Oslo, Norway. A few months after Hema died, in 2016, her work was exhibited under the theme "Megacities Asia" at the Museum of Fine Arts, Boston.

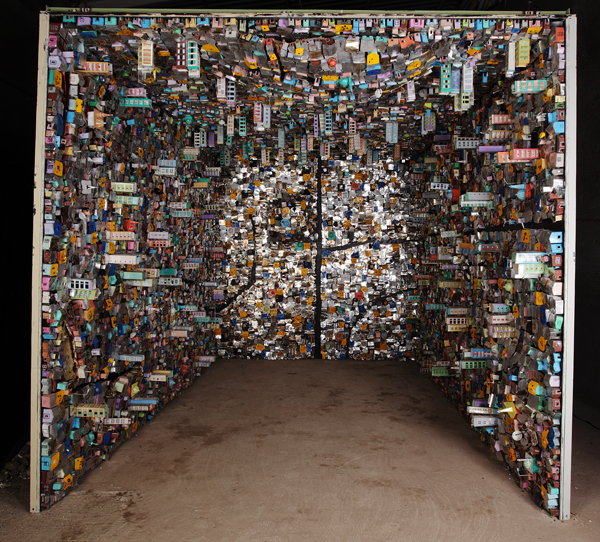
8' x 12', 2009, installation, Indian Highway

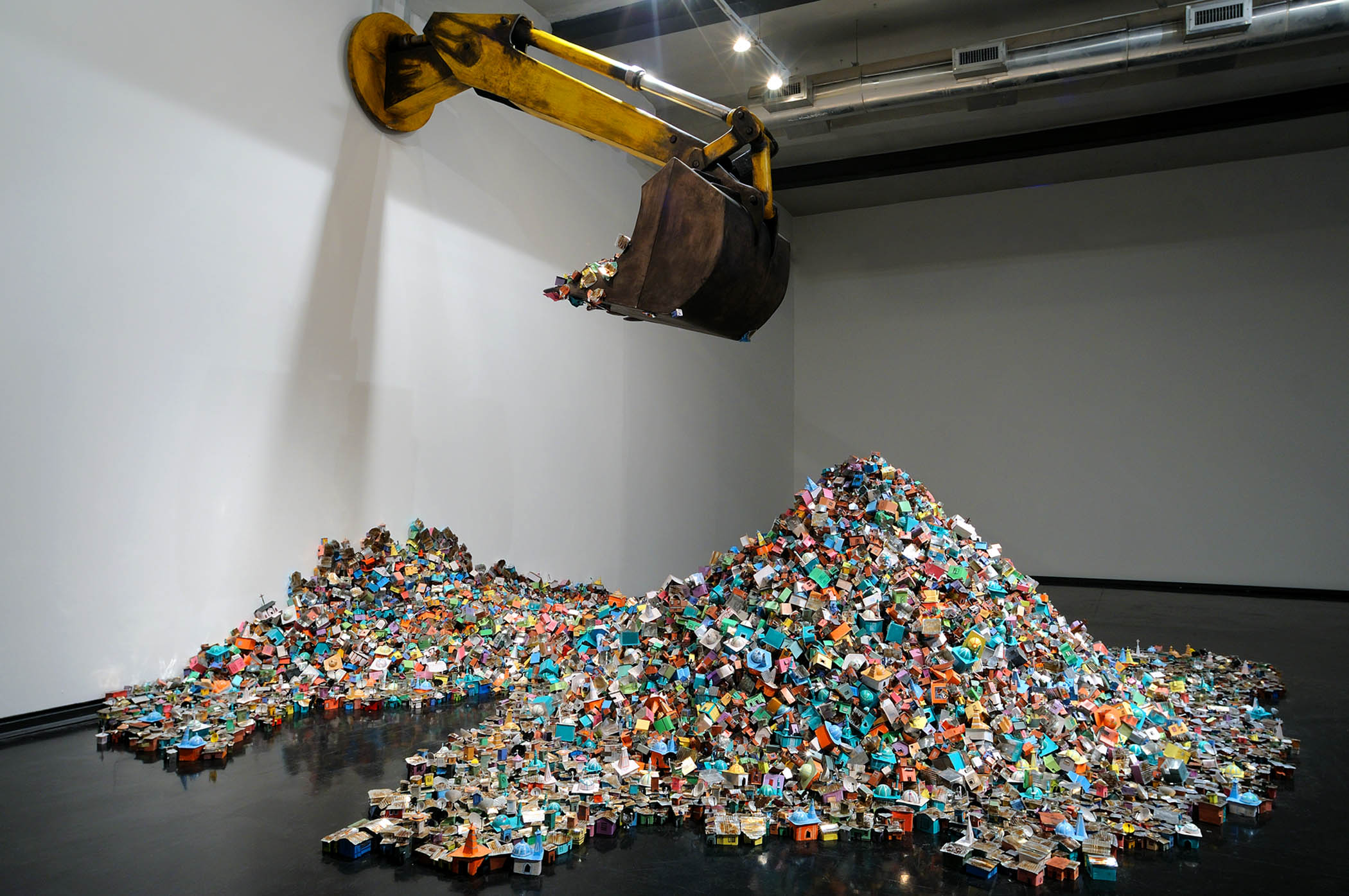
Where the bees suck, there suck I, 2009, MACRO Museum, Rome, Italy

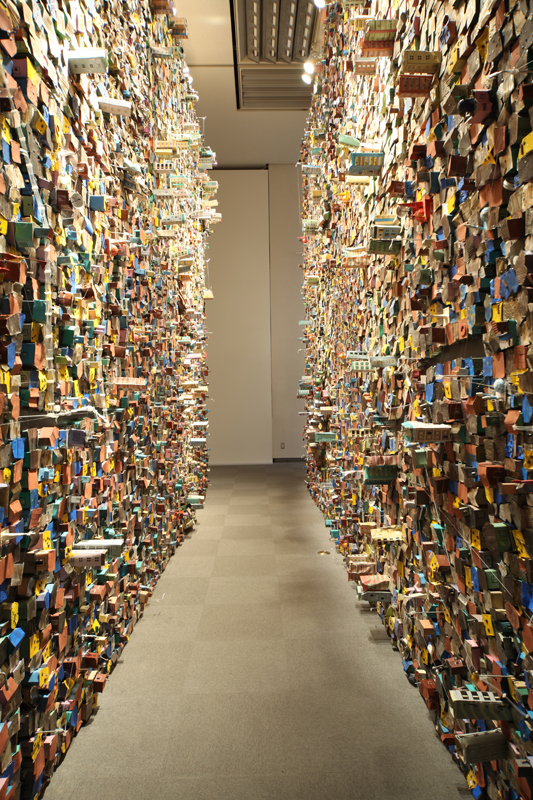
Think left, think right, think low, think tight, 2010, Aichi Triennial, Nagoya, Japan & Centre Pompidou, Paris, France, 2011

She was the only Indian artist to be part of the inaugural exhibition for the Reopening of the MACRO museum, Rome. The exhibition was curated by Luca Massimi Barbero, Hema exhibited her installation titled Where the bees suck, there suck I.

== Residencies and workshops ==
In 2010, Hema was invited to a residency at Atelier Calder, Sache, France. While there, she completed the work Only Memory has Preservatives, this work was inspired by the natural surroundings in Sache, but also reflected ideas that have been part of her practice. Hema tried to replicate the forest in her studio, though not in the literal sense. Using copyright free images of certain trees found in the area, she created a landscape work without using materials from nature.

In 2003 she was part of the Vasl residency in Karachi where she made a work titled Loco foco motto (which she later in 2007 exhibited in a group show at the Hanger Bicocca, Milan, Italy) that spoke about the India-Pakistan divide keeping in mind her own family history related to the partition of India. The works were also a break from her trademark symbolism, they were more craft oriented as she used matchsticks and glue to make chandeliers. Constructed of thousands of un-ignited matchsticks assembled into elaborate chandeliers, these pieces embody an important element of Hindu ritual, symbolising creation and destruction.

Her later works featured patterned surfaces, which quote from Indian spiritual iconography and traditional textile design, titled Killing Site. Dream a wish-wish a dream (2006) was the first large-scale installation that Hema did. At first glance her installation seems to be only a landscape of Bombay; however, it is actually a statement on the changing landscape by migrants who make Bombay.

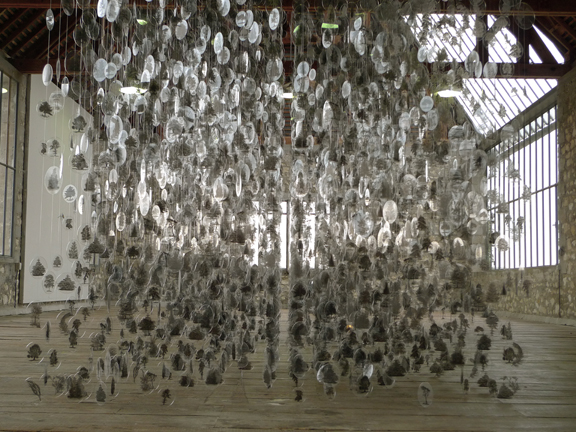
Only Memory has Preservatives, 2010, Atelier Calder, Sache, France

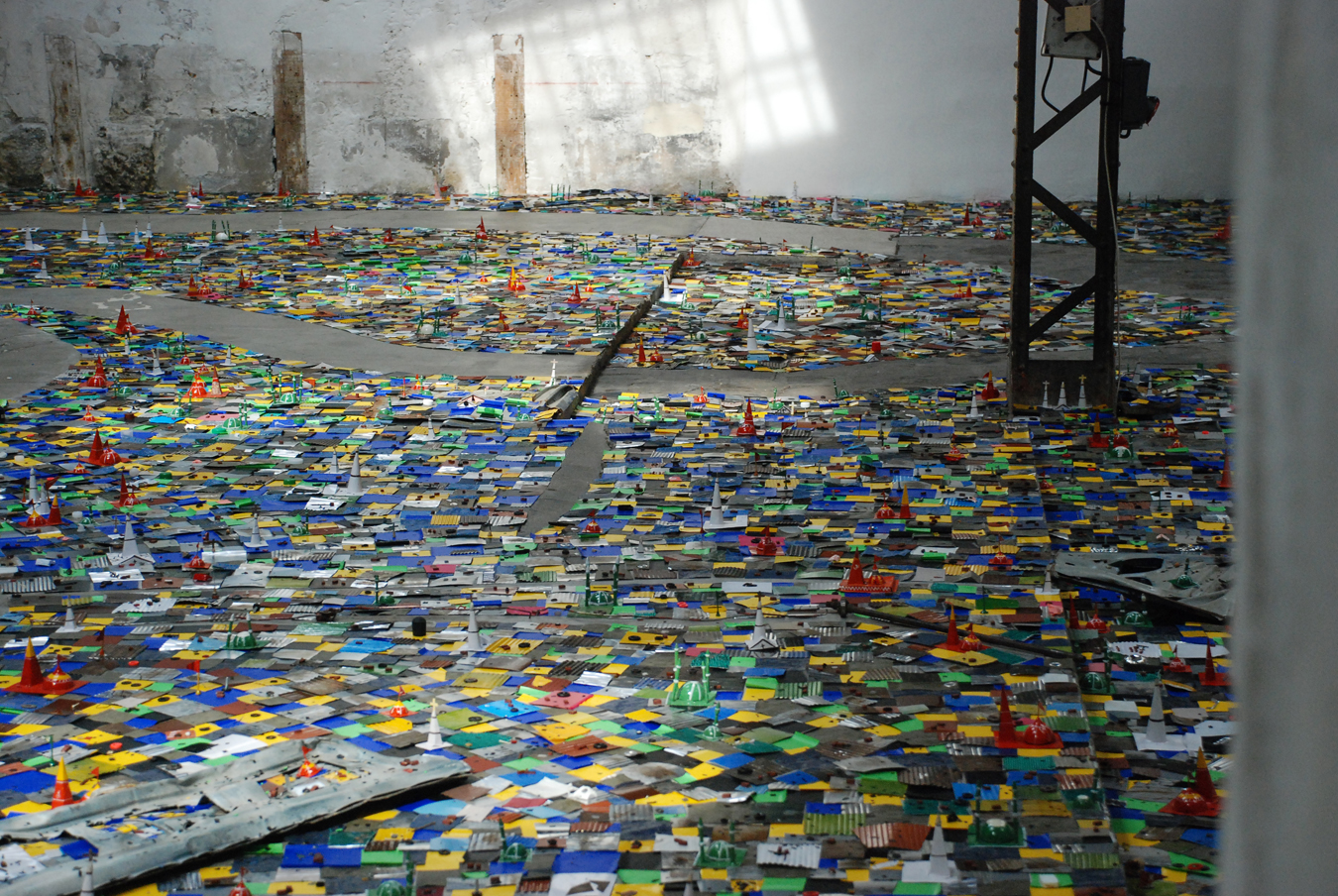
Moderniznation, 2011, Espace Topographie de l'Art, Festival D' Automne a Paris, Paris, France

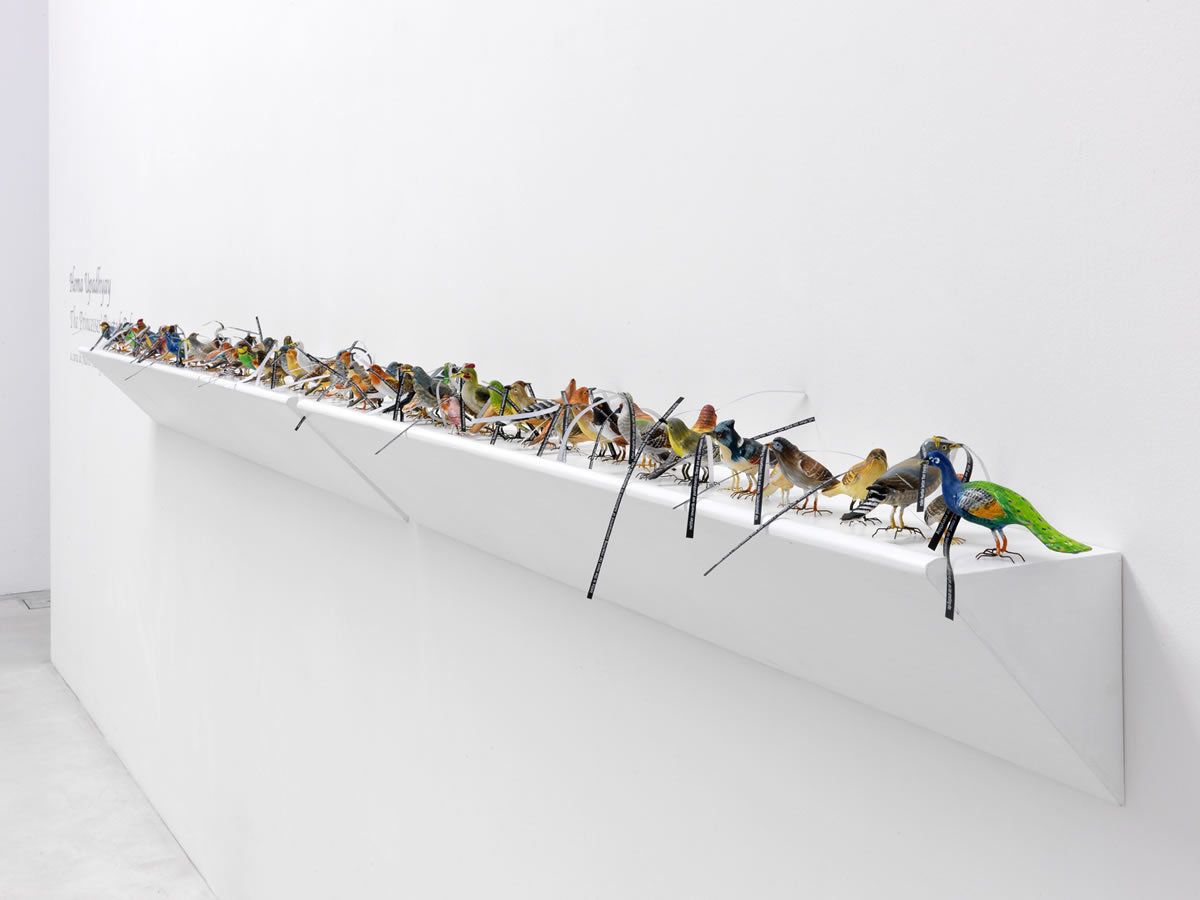
The Princesses' Rusted Belt, 250 handmade clay birds, iron wire, acrylic, watercolours, cotton thread and text on printing paper, dimensions variable, 2011, Studio La Citta, Verona, Italy

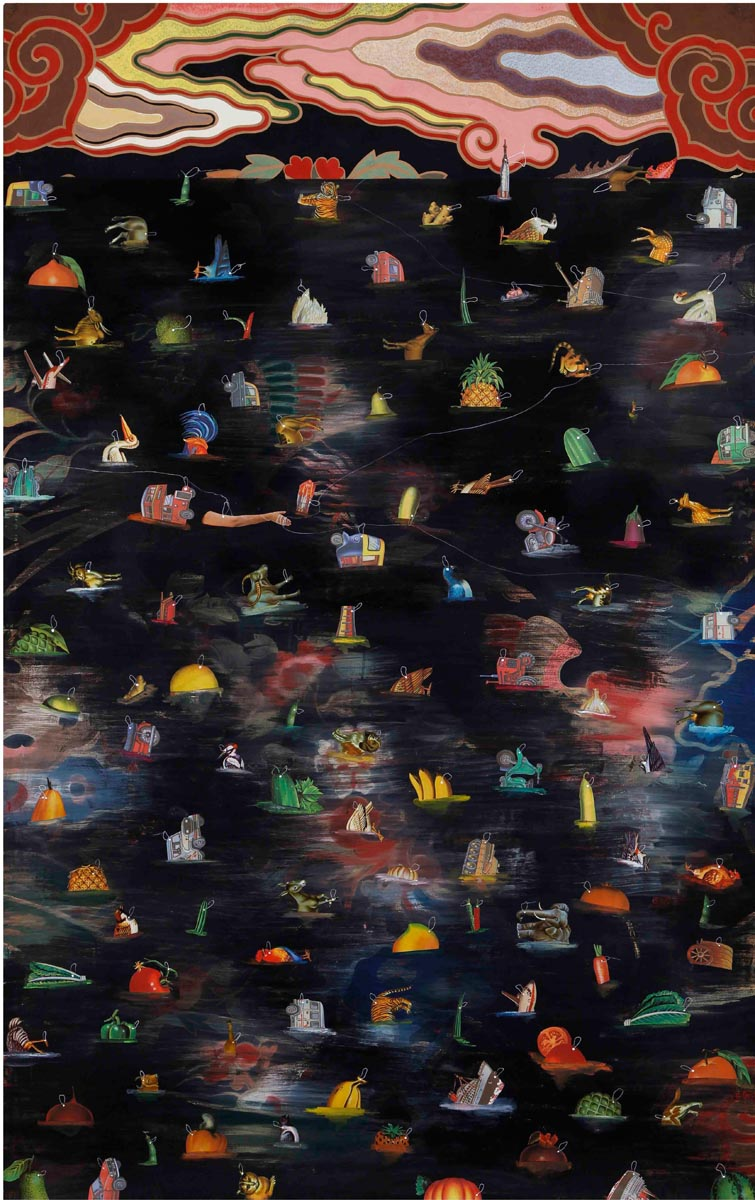
The Princesses' Rusted Belt, Mixed media on arches paper, 72 x 48 in, 2011, Studio La Citta, Verona, Italy

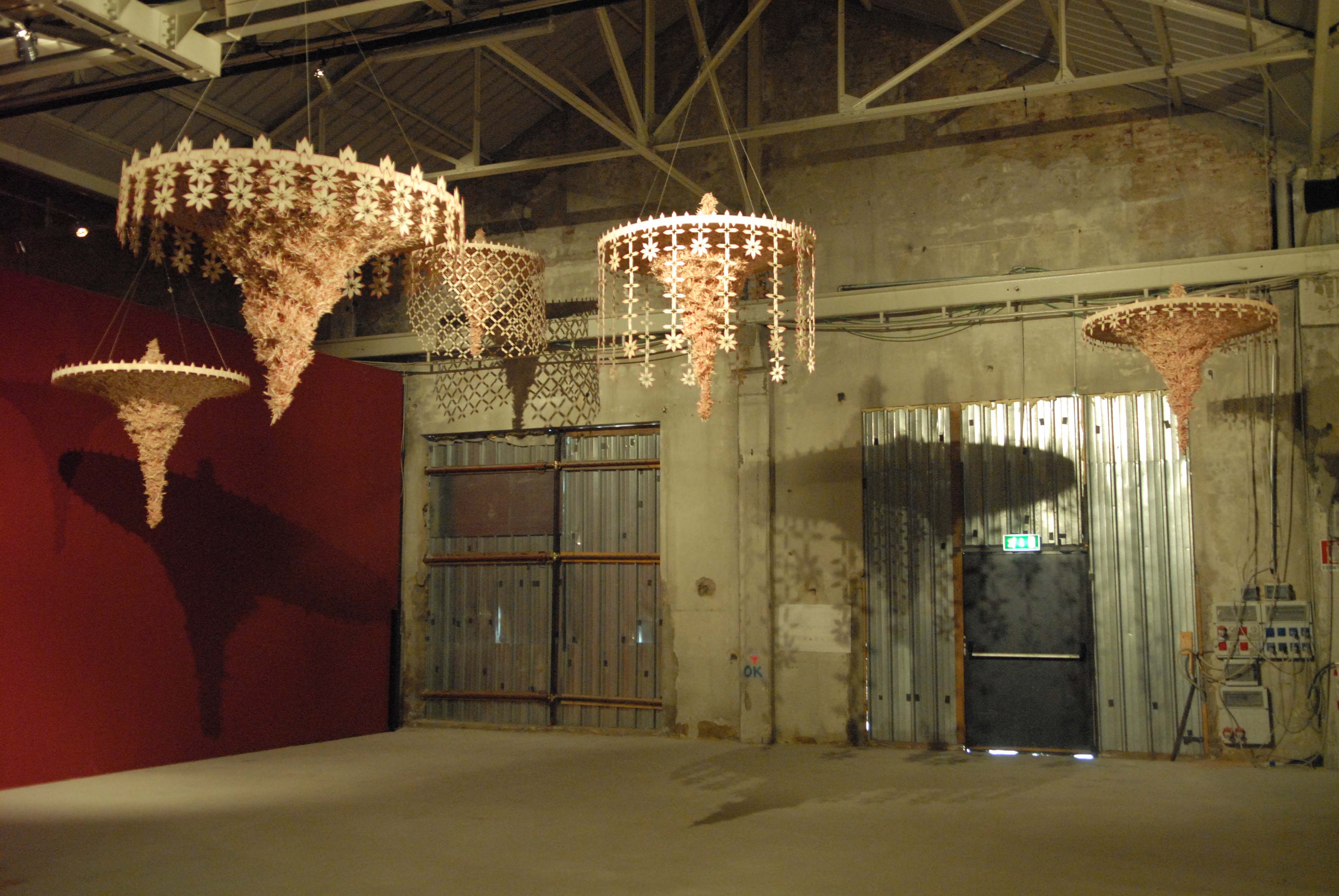
Loco foco motto, 2007, Hanger Bicocca, Milan, Italy

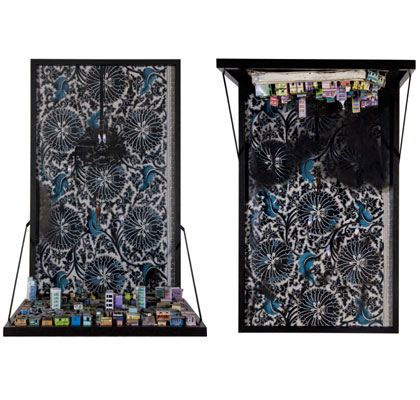
Killing Site, 2008, Studio La Citta, Verona, Italy

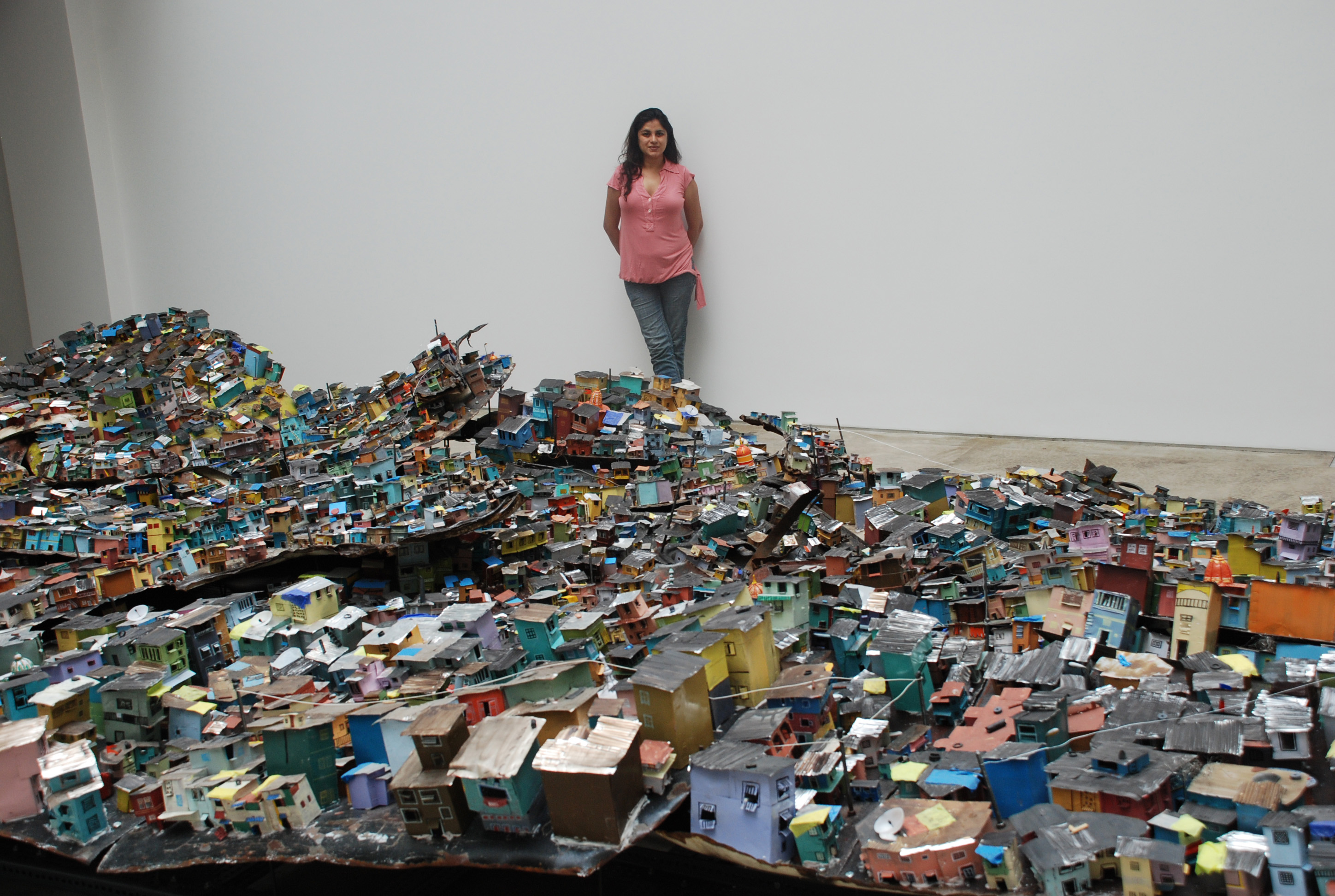
Dream a wish-wish a dream, 2006

== Solo presentations ==
- 2012 Extra Ordinary, Faculty of Fine Arts Baroda, and Vadehra Art Gallery, New Delhi
- 2012 Mute Migration, Art Gallery of New South Wales, Sydney, Australia
- 2011–12 Princesses Rusted Belt, Studio La Citta, Verona Italy (Ex Cat)
- 2011 Moderniznation, Espace Topographie de l'Art, Festival D' Automne a Paris, Paris
- 2009 Where the bees suck, there suck I, Reopening of MACRO museum, Rome Italy
- 2008–09 Yours Sincerely, Gallery Nature Morte, New Delhi
- 2008 Universe revolves on, Singapore Tyler Print Institute, Singapore (Ex. Cat)
- 2004 Underneath, Gallery Chemould, Bombay (Ex. Cat)
- 2001–02 The Nymph and the Adult, Institute of Modern Art, Brisbane (Ex. Cat)
- 2001 Sweet Sweat Memories, Gallery Chemould, Bombay (Ex. Cat)
- 2001 The Nymph and the Adult, Art Space, Sydney

== Group shows ==
- 4th International Print Biennale, Bharat Bhavan, Bhopal, 1997
- Prithvi Art Gallery, Mumbai, 1998
- Secret Life of Objects, Lakeeran Gallery, Mumbai, 2000
- Exchanging Territories, Shridharani Gallery, New Delhi, 2001
- X International Triennale, Lalit Kala Academi, New Delhi, 2001
- Transfiguration, Art Inc, India Habitat Center, New Delhi, 2002
- crossing generations: diVERGE, Gallery Chemould, Mumbai, 2003
- Loco-Foco-Motto, a sculpture made with match sticks, International Artists' Residency, Karachi, Pakistan, 2003
- Parthenogenesis, Ivan Dougherty Gallery, Sydney, Australia, 2003
- The Tree from the Seed, Hennie Onstad Kunssenter, Oslo, Norway, 2003
- Have We Met, Japan Foundation Forum, Tokyo, Japan, 2004
- Indian Summer: Ecole Nationale Superieure des Beaux Arts, Paris, 2005
- Indian Contemporary Art, Chelsea college of Art, London, 2005
- Present Future, NGMA, Mumbai, 2005
- Parallel Realities-Asian Art Now, The 3rd Fukuoka Asian Art Triennale, Blackburn Museum, Blackburn, UK, 2006
- Long Happy Hours and Thereby Happiness and Other stories, the Museum Gallery, Mumbai, 2006

== Artist-in-residence ==
- 2010 Atelier Calder, Sache, France
- 2008 Singapore Tyler Print Institute, Singapore
- 2007 Mattress Factory, Pittsburgh, USA
- 2003 Vasl International Artists Residency, Karachi
- 2001 Art Space, Sydney

== Death ==
Hema Upadhyay and her lawyer Haresh Bhambani were killed on Friday, 11 December 2015, reportedly over a financial dispute. Bhambhani had represented Hema in court cases against her ex-husband Chintan. After filing for a divorce in 2010, Chintan and Hema had lived in different rooms of their Mumbai flat until their divorce in 2014. In 2013, Hema had filed a harassment case against Chintan, accusing him of painting obscene sketches on the walls of their Mumbai flat. Represented by Bhambhani, she lost the case after the court ruled that Chintan's bedroom was his personal space. After their divorce, Chintan moved to Delhi. Bhambani represented Hema in another case seeking alimony: Hema demanded an alimony of ₹ 200,000 per month; but the court reduced that amount to ₹ 40,000 per month. On the day of their murders, Chintan had paid ₹ 200,000 to Bhambhani as part of an alimony payout.

Hema had contracted out her art fabrication work to Vidyadhar Rajbhar (alias Gotu), the owner of Vanshraj Arts. She also stored her artwork at his warehouse. Vidyadhar's family had a close relationship with the family of her ex-husband Chintan. In fact, Vidyadhar's father Vanshraj had named him after Chintan's father. When Vidyadhar's father fell ill and faced financial troubles, Chintan paid for his medical expenses of over ₹ 500,000. Chintan had also sponsored Vidyadhar's training in fabrication at Jaipur. According to Vidyadhar's associates, Hema owed Vidyadhar some money, and he had visited Hema's residence many times to seek the payment. However, according to the police investigators, it was Vidyadhar who was heavily in debt, and had taken loans from Hema, Chintan and others. He owed Hema ₹ 200,000. On the day of the murders, he called Hema to his Kandivali warehouse, claiming that he had some video evidence that could strengthen her case against Chintan. Hema took along Bhambhani to examine the evidence.

On 11 December, the day of the murders, Hema called her domestic help Lalit Mandal around 6.30pm, informing him that she would have dinner outside. Bhambhani left his Matunga home around 6pm, telling his family that he was going to meet a client in Andheri. The two met at Hema's studio in Andheri. Around 8 pm, they left for Kandivali to meet Vidyadhar. At the warehouse, Vidyadhar was accompanied by his associates Azad Rajbhar, Pradeep Rajbhar and Shiv Kumar Rajbhar (alias Sadhu). They had planned to scare Hema using a chemical-soaked napkin. The chemical is believed to be chloroform (used to clean the moulds of sculptures) or a pesticide (which Vidyadhar procured from his brother). Vidyadhar held Hema from behind, as Azad held the napkin to her face. When Bhambhani intervened, Shiv and Pradeep overpowered him. Initially, they only restrained Bhambhani with ropes and duct tapes. But when they realized that the chemical had killed Hema, they killed Bhambhani for being a witness.

The Rajbhars packed the dead bodies in cardboard boxes that they used to transport artwork. They then transported the bodies to the drain (nullah) in a temp truck driven by Vijay Kumar Rajbhar. Vidyadhar and Shiv then decided to escape to their native village in Uttar Pradesh. They caught a train to Varanasi from Dadar around 9:30 pm. After reaching Itarsi, Vidyadhar told Shiv that he wanted to surrender, and got off the train.

A Museum of Arts, Boston official, mourned the death of Hema. Her work was scheduled to be exhibited at the museum a few months after she died.

=== Police investigation ===
When Hema did not return home at night, her domestic help Mandal tried to contact her, only to find her mobile phone switched off. He then contacted her relatives and friends. The next morning, he registered a missing persons complaint. Bhambani's family also found his phone switched off, and registered a complaint.

On Saturday, around 7:30 pm, a sweeper noticed a hand in the boxes floating in the drain, opposite a crematorium in the Dahanukar Wadi area of Kandivali. He alerted the police, who retrieved the boxes. The bodies had been wrapped in transparent polyurethane sheets before being stuffed in the cardboard boxes. They were naked except for undergarments. The bodies had not decomposed, and the police were able to identify the victims. Based on the CCTV footage and call records, the police determined that the two had met at her studio in Andheri, and left in Bhambhani's car. The last call made from Bhambani's mobile phone, around 8:30pm, was traced to Kandivali.

The police located the manufacturing details and the batch number from the cardboard boxes. This, in addition to the call detail records of the victims, led the police to Vidyadhar's fabrication unit in Laljipada area of Kandivali. After analyzing CCTV footage from some houses in the area, the police apprehended Vijay, the truck driver. Vijay informed the police about the other suspects, but insisted that he did not know that there were dead bodies inside the boxes. The police then arrested Azad and Pradeep.

A Special Task Force (STF) of the Uttar Pradesh police intercepted Shiv Kumar on his way from the Varanasi station to his native village Gosaipur. The STF recovered ATM cards, SIM cards and other documents belonging to Hema and Bhambhani from him. He confessed to the murders. Vidyadhar is currently at large. The police have not completely ruled out Chintan as a suspect, due to his close acquaintance with Vidyadhar. The call detail record (CDR) of Chintan's phone shows that the two men exchanged several calls a fortnight before the murders. Hema's family as well as police suspect that Chintan paid Vidyadhar to commit her murder. In February 2016, a group of 61 artists demanded his release arguing that the police had been unable to find any evidence against him.

In October 2023, Chintan Upadhyay was convicted of murder and sentenced to life in prison by a Dindoshi court.
