= Kirti Stambh, Vadodara =

Tower of Fame/Triumph

Coordinates: 22.29575°N 73.19766°E

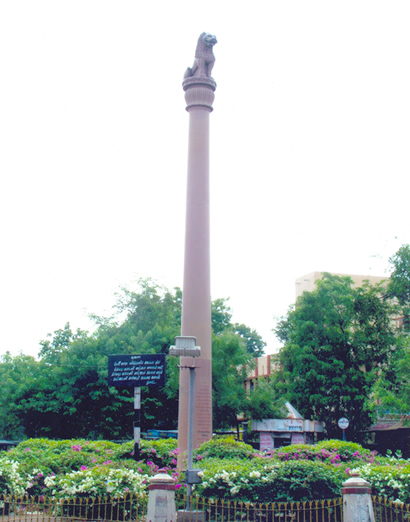
Kirti Stambh

Kirti Stambh, (lit. 'Tower of Fame/Triumph'), is located in the city of Vadodara, Gujarat state, western India.

== Location ==
It is located on Chamaraja Road in Vadodara. It was named after Chamaraja Wodeyar, Maharaja of Mysore who was a close friend of Maharaja Sayajirao Gaekwad III to mark the friendship between Maharaja Sayajirao Gaekwad III. Similarly a road in Mysore as Sayajirao Road. Chamaraja Road starts from Eastern gate of Lakshmi Vilas Palace and has other prominent landmarks like Khanderao Market, which hosts the office of Vadodara Municipal Corporation and others before terminating near Bhagat Singh Chowk.
