= Chamaraja Road, Vadodara =

Road in Vadodara, India

Coordinates: 22.295400716675953°N 73.19603816874006°E

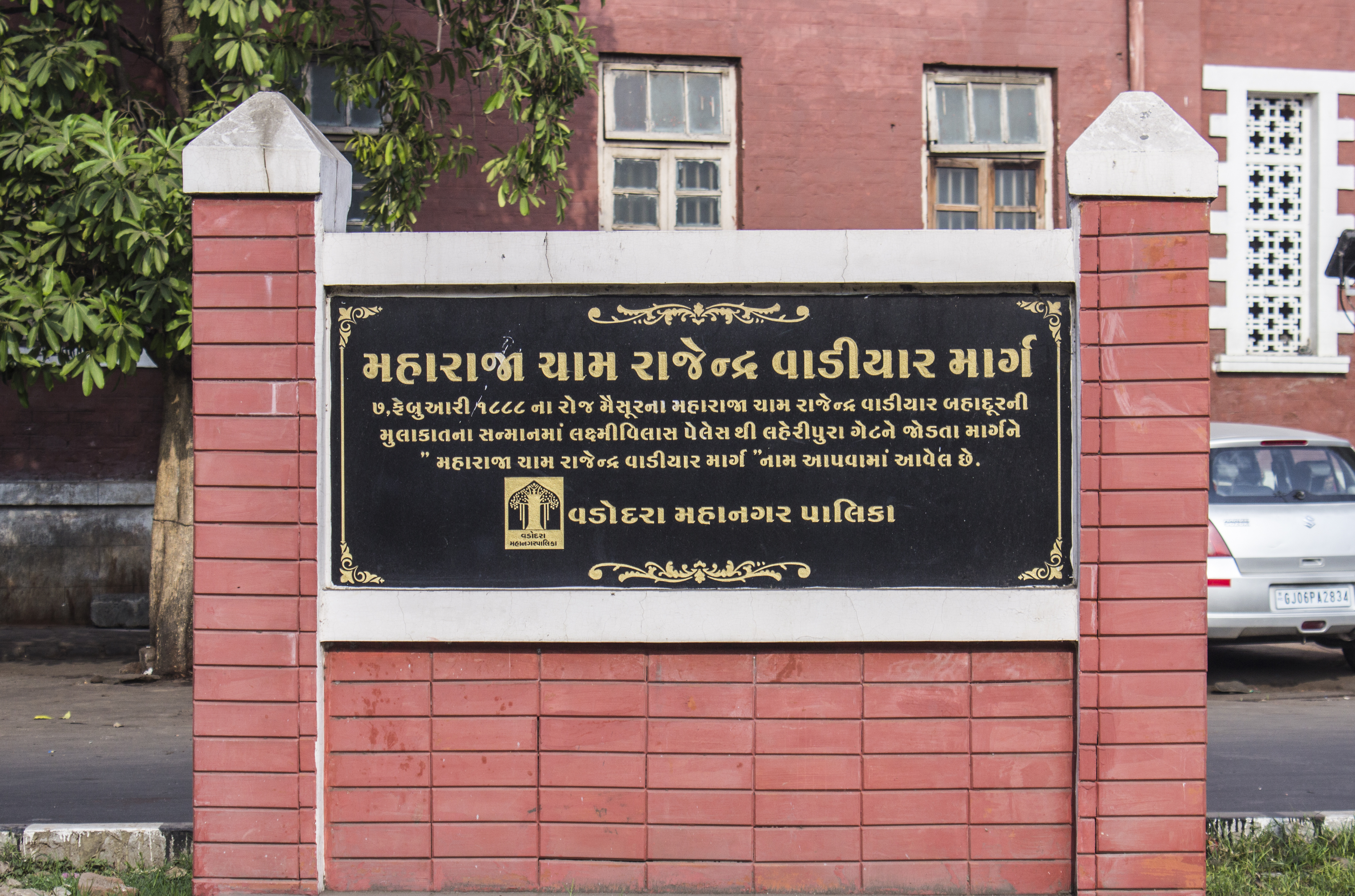
Plaque of "Maharaja Cham Rajendra Wadiyar Marg", Vadodara

Chamaraja Road, also known as Chamaraja Wodayar Road, is a road in Vadodara, India. It runs east from Lakshmi Vilas Palace at one end to Bhagat Singh Chowk at the other. Known as Maharshi Dayanand Saraswati Rajmarg (since 13 May 2015) or Rajmahal Road in the past, the road was renamed back to Chamaraja Road in 2017.

== History ==
This road was named after Chamaraja Wodayar by Sayajirao Gaekwad in 1888. Both then Yuvarajas were very good friends and Sayajirao Gaekwad named the road leading to the Palace through Gate-2 as Chamaraja Road. Similarly a road bordering Mysore Palace on east direction was named Sayajirao Road when Sayajirao Gaekwad visited Mysore in late 1893. During his visit, Sayajirao Gaekwad was inspired by the huge collection of rare manuscripts in Oriental Research Institute, Mysore and started a new Oriental Institute in Vadodara on 1 September 1927 in Central Library and later shifted to a dedicated campus near Palace. Now the Institute is affiliated to Maharaja Sayajirao University of Baroda. Another similarity between these stalwarts is both of them were adopted from Maharajas and went on to become the rulers of their Kingdom.

Chamaraja Road is also one of the busiest roads in the city and is lined on one side with retail stores, food outlets, restaurants and many more. It has many office buildings, shops and markets. It is also a home to many buildings and banks. Khanderao Market, which hosts the office of Vadodara Municipal Corporation and famous landmark in the city Kirti Stambh are located in this Road.
