= Khatiya =

Village in Gujarat, India

- Village
- Location in Gujarat, India Khatiya (India)
- Coordinates: 23.654455834670635°N 68.67443916416588°E
- Country: India
- State: Gujarat
- District: Kutch
- Taluka: Lakhpat

Languages
  - Native: Kutchi
  - Official: Gujarati
- Time zone: UTC+5:30 (IST)
- Postal code: 370627

Khatiya, also known as Khatia, is a village in Gujarat, India. It is located in Lakhpat taluka of Kutch district. It is close to the India-Pakistan border.

Khatiya has received international attention in recent years due to archaeological finds pertaining to the Indus Valley Civilisation.

== Archaeological excavations ==
In 2018, a mass burial site with about 500 graves along with many artifacts were unearthed in Khatiya. No signs of nearby settlements were found around the necropolis, which puzzled archaeologists. In 2024, remains of a settlement were found in Padta Bet which is situated about 1.5 km from Khatiya. Most burial pits had 5 to 6 pots recovered from them but one had 62. The burial structures, made from sandstone and shale, had boulders of basalt used as covering in some. Clay was used to bind the building materials.

The burial site at Juna Khatiya has yielded one intact male human skeleton plus other partly preserved skeletal remains including skull fragments, bones and teeth. Many burial artifacts such as bangles, beads made of shell, ceramic vessels, bowls, dishes, pots, small pitchers, beakers, clay pots, water cups, bottles and jars were also unearthed.

The excavation of settlement site at the hillock of Padta Bet has yielded remains of a circular structure and other rectangular structures of varying sizes and made of locally available sandstone and shales. According to Rajesh S. V., one of the leaders of the archaeological team, the presence of pottery, artifacts, and animal bone fragments are indicative of the occupation of Harappan people in the region from the Early Harappan to Late Harappan periods circa 3200 BCE to 1700 BCE, and the evidence of ceramics also indicate the presence of Early Harappan, Classical Harappan, and Late Harappan type.
