= Nandita Kumar =

Indian new media artist

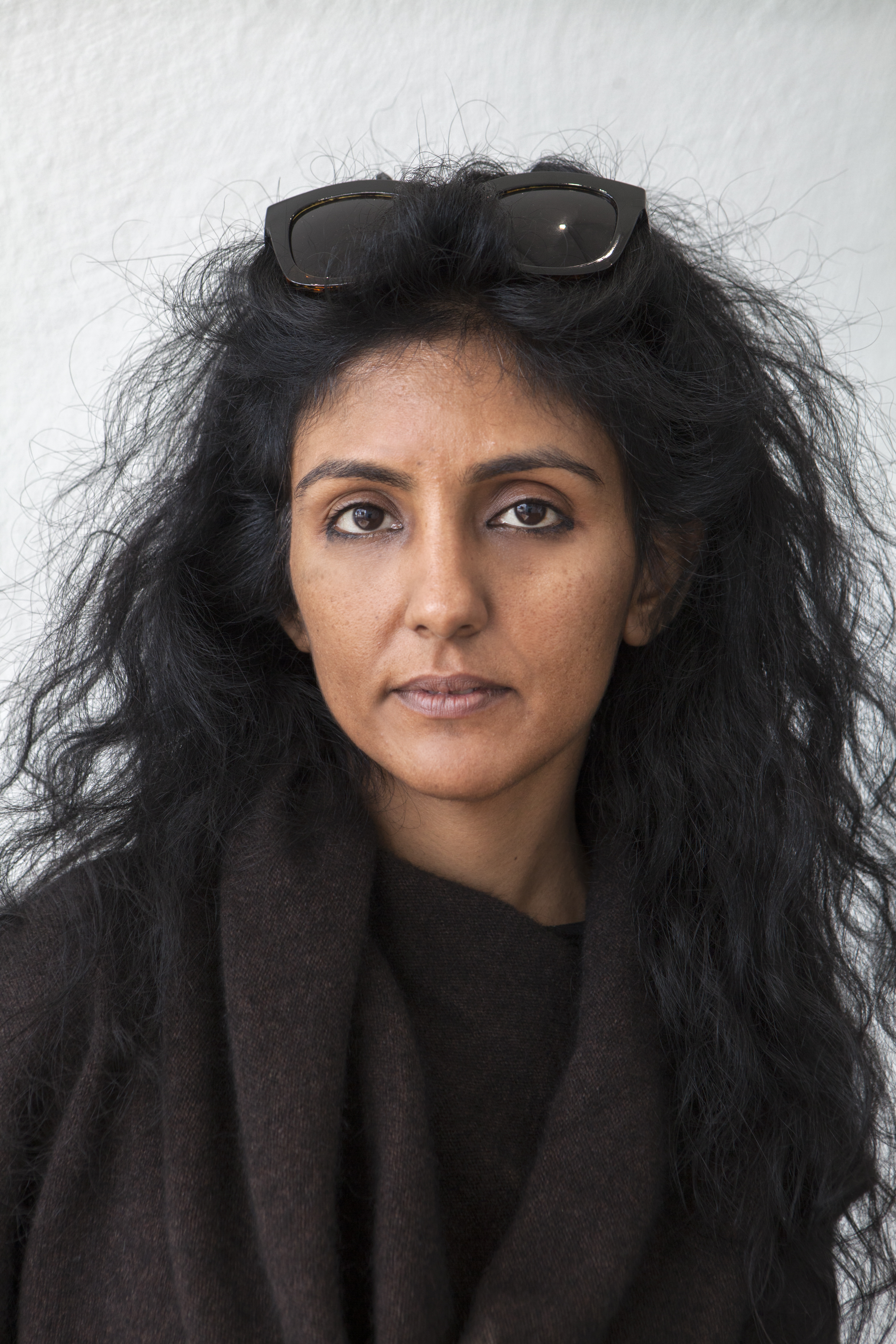
- Kumar in 2017
- Born: 1981 (age 44–45); Pamplemousses, Mauritius
- Education: Maharaja Sayajirao University of Baroda; Elam School of Fine Arts; California Institute of the Arts
- Movement: New media art
- Website: nanditakumar.com

Nandita Kumar (born 1981) is a New Zealand new media artist. Her artwork often explores climate change, contradictions between natural and industrial landscapes, and personal identities and makes use of technological and interactive elements.

== Personal life and education ==
Nandita Kumar was born in 1981 in Pamplemousses, Mauritius. She grew up in different locations in India, never staying in the same place for long. Kumar was interested in art from an early age. In her youth, her father introduced her to the work of Malcolm de Chazal, and they sat and painted together. Kumar's family migrated from India to New Zealand.

Kumar initially worked as a programmer before pursuing a career in art. She holds Bachelors of Fine Arts from both the Maharaja Sayajirao University of Baroda in India and the Elam School of Fine Arts of the University of Auckland in New Zealand. From 2006 to 2009 she studied at the California Institute of the Arts (CalArts) in the United States, from which she holds a Master of Fine Arts in Experimental Animation and Filmmaking.

Kumar alternates between being based in Auckland, New Zealand and in Mumbai or Goa, India.

== Career ==
Kumar's artwork is often focused on climate change, contradictions between natural and industrial landscapes and personal identities. Her installations combine art with technology, environmental science and interactive elements to make information on climate change accessible. Technological elements that have been used in her art includes motherboards, smartphone apps, sound, animation, video, and microwave and solar sensors. In addition to complex art installations, Kumar also creates animations, paintings, and interactive sculptures, integrating different media techniques and technologies.

Kumar's work has been displayed at film festivals and art exhibitions worldwide. In 2009, Kumar curated the experimental film section of the festival SPIEL09 in Austria. She had her first own art exhibition in 2010, Let the Brain Fly, which included 25 works all related to "travelling along the nodes of a brain". In 2011–2012, Kumar curated the community art project Ghar Pe/At Home in Hong Kong. Her artwork has been featured in group exhibitions such as Exo-Evolution at the Center for Art and Media in Karlsruhe in 2015, ARS17: Hello world! at Kiasma in Helsinki in 2017, and Delirium/Equilibrium at the Kiran Nadar Museum of Art in New Delhi in 2018. She was one of the artists exhibiting work at the India Art Fair in New Delhi in 2015. Kumar's art piece at the fair, a machine that mimicked the handwriting of visitors, garnered much attention.

Kumar has spoken at TEDx and at the Museum of Contemporary Art in Sydney.

== Recognition ==
Kumar's short film Birth of a Brain Fly won an award for "Best Original Music" at the 2008 Cinema Mundo festival in Brazil. The film was also included on the "Best of Sydney Underground" DVD released after the 2009 Sydney Underground Film Festival. In 2014, Kumar was a nominee for a New Technological Art Award (NTAA), the first person from India to be nominated for the award. In 2022, she was among nineteen "outstanding practitioners in the fields of visual arts, film, literature, and music" selected as a fellow of the DAAD Artists-in-Berlin Program. Kumar was among numerous "ecologically conscious" contemporary artists highlighted by art critics Maja and Reuben Fowkes in their 2022 book Art and Climate Change.
