= Prateek Sharma (gastroenterologist) =

Indian American gastroenterologist

Prateek Sharma FACG, FACP, FASGE
- Born: India
- Education: M.S. University of Baroda (1991); Medical College of Wisconsin (1995); University of Arizona (1997)
- Awards: American Society of Gastrointestinal Endoscopy Crystal Award recipient for Distinguished Endoscopic Research Mentoring (2014); Padma Shri (2026)
- Scientific career
- Fields: Gastroenterology

Prateek Sharma is an Indian American gastroenterologist and academic known for his work on esophageal diseases, GERD, Barrett's esophagus, and advanced endoscopic techniques.

He is a professor of medicine at the University of Kansas School of Medicine. He also serves as the president of the American Society for Gastrointestinal Endoscopy and chair of the ASGE Artificial Intelligence Institute.

== Early life and career ==
Sharma was born in Chandigarh, India. He graduated with an MBBS from M.S. University of Baroda in 1991. He completed his internal medicine residency at the Medical College of Wisconsin in Milwaukee and his gastroenterology fellowship at the University of Arizona in Tucson.

He is currently a professor of medicine and program director for the gastroenterology fellowship program at the University of Kansas School of Medicine.

Sharma is a Fellow of the American College of Physicians.

=== Career and achievements ===
Sharma was elected president of the American Society for Gastrointestinal Endoscopy, which represents more than 15,000 members globally and is considered the largest professional organization dedicated to gastrointestinal endoscopy. He also serves as Chair of the ASGE Artificial Intelligence (AI) Institute, where he leads initiatives promoting the integration of AI technologies into gastrointestinal diagnostics and therapeutic practices.

In 2024, Sharma was awarded the VAIBHAV Fellowship by the Government of India in recognition of his collaborative research efforts between the United States and India on the use of AI in early detection of gastrointestinal cancers.

Sharma has contributed to policy discussions on the role of AI in healthcare, including participating in a roundtable with members of the United States Congress. He was interviewed by CNN regarding the gastrointestinal side effects of GLP-1 receptor agonists, a class of popular weight loss drugs. In the same year, he met with the Chief Minister of Andhra Pradesh, India, to explore AI-based applications for improving maternal health systems.

In 2026, Sharma was announced as one of three Indian-Americans to be awarded at India's annual Padma Awards for 2026.

== Scientific work ==
Sharma is best known for improving the diagnosis and management of GI diseases and cancer, specifically in esophageal diseases, GERD, Barrett's esophagus, advanced imaging, and endoscopic treatments. He is the current chair of the ASGE AI Task Force and the director of the Global GI AI Annual Meeting. He also received the Elaine Blaylock Cancer Research Professorship at the University of Kansas Cancer Center in 2023.

Sharma has been interviewed by the Wall Street Journal and Newsweek. He has over 400 publications, including original articles and book chapters, and has been invited to present at over 500 major national and international meetings. He's also a reviewer and on the editorial board of the leading gastroenterology journal and has been part of the development of key clinical guidelines for Barrett's esophagus. In addition, he has published several important textbooks: Barrett’s Esophagus and Esophageal Cancer, Rise of Acid Reflux in Asia, and Gastrointestinal Cancers.

Sharma has and continues to publish in several national and international journals, including the New England Journal of Medicine, Annals of Internal Medicine, Gastrointestinal Endoscopy, Gastroenterology, and American Journal of Gastroenterology. He is a principal investigator and lead clinician on multiple clinical trials involving patients with Barrett's esophagus, gastroesophageal reflux disease, and artificial intelligence. He is also the leader of Barrett's esophagus study group; a global consortium of 7 academic institutions. He has developed a registry of patients with Barrett's esophagus, dysplasia and cancer prospectively followed at each of these centers to study the natural history and health care utilization and evaluate factors associated with progression.

== Awards and honours ==
2026 - Padma Shri

2023 – American Gastroenterological Association Distinguished Educator Award

2022 – World Endoscopy Organization Distinguished Educator Award

2017 – American Gastroenterological Association Esophagogastroduodenoscopy (EGD) Section Mentor Award

2016 – American Society of Gastrointestinal Endoscopy Research Mentor Award

2014 – American Society of Gastrointestinal Endoscopy Crystal Award recipient for Distinguished Endoscopic Research Mentoring.

== Publications ==
- Sharma, P., Dent, J., Armstrong, D., Bergman, J. J., Gossner, L., Hoshihara, Y., ... & Vieth, M. (2006). The development and validation of an endoscopic grading system for Barrett's esophagus: the Prague C & M criteria. Gastroenterology, 131(5), 1392–1399 (241 citations).
- Sharma, P. (2009). Barrett's esophagus. New England Journal of Medicine, 361(26), 2548-2556 (181 citations).
- Sharma, P., Falk, G. W., Weston, A. P., Reker, D., Johnston, M., & Sampliner, R. E. (2006). Dysplasia and cancer in a large multicenter cohort of patients with Barrett's esophagus. Clinical Gastroenterology and Hepatology, 4(5), 566–572 (102 citations).
- Sharma, P., Bansal, A., Mathur, S., Wani, S., Cherian, R., McGregor, D., ... & Weston, A. (2006). The utility of a novel narrow band imaging endoscopy system in patients with Barrett's esophagus. Gastrointestinal Endoscopy, 64(2), 167–175 (84 citations).
- Sharma, P., Weston, A. P., Topalovski, M., Cherian, R., Bhattacharyya, A., & Sampliner, R. E. (2003). Magnification chromoendoscopy for the detection of intestinal metaplasia and dysplasia in Barrett's oesophagus. Gut, 52(1), 24–27 (62 citations).
- Sharma, Prateek; Parasa, Sravanthi (August 2023). "ChatGPT and large language models in gastroenterology." Nature Reviews Gastroenterology & Hepatology. 20 (8): 481–482.
- Sharma, Prateek; Hassan, Cesare (April 2022). "Artificial Intelligence and Deep Learning for Upper Gastrointestinal Neoplasia." Gastroenterology. 162 (4): 1056–1066.
- Sharma, Prateek (16 August 2022). "Barrett Esophagus: A Review." JAMA. 328 (7): 663–671.
