= Vijayakumar Menon =

Indian art critic (1945–2022)

Vijayakumar Menon (3 May 1946 – 1 November 2022) was an Indian art critic, writer, translator and art teacher from Kerala. He was a winner of several awards including the Kerala Lalithakala Akademi Award for best book on art, Kerala Sahitya Akademi's endowment for scholarly literature, Kesari Puraskaram, and Gurudarsanam Award.

Vijayakumar Menon was born as the son of Chettakkal Madhom Karthyayini Amma and Ananthan Pillai from Elamakkara, Ernakulam. After graduation from Kalady Sree Sankara College, he joined FACT in 1966. After about 18 years of service, he resigned from FACT and joined Maharaja Sayajirao University of Baroda to pursue studies in art and art history and secured a M A degree in Art History. Later, he worked as an art teacher at Mysore College of Visual Arts, RLV College of Music and Fine Arts in Tripunithura, Sree Sankaracharya University of Sanskrit, College of Fine Arts, Thrissur, and Guruvayur Institute of Mural paintings.

Menon was unmarried and had been living in Jnana Ashram in Vyasagiri, Wadakkancherry, Thrissur, Kerala and Vyasa Tapovanam since 1989. Menon died on 1 November 2022, at the age of 76.

== Books authored by Vijayakumar Menon ==
The books on art and art history authored by Vijayakumar Menon include:

- Bharathiya Kala Charitram (History of Indian Art), Kerala Sahitya Akademi, 2011
- Bharathiya Lavanya Darsanavum Kala Parasparyavum
- Kerala Kala Samskaram, Kerala Lalithakala Akademi, 2021
- Adhunika Kaladarsanam
- Ravivarma Padanam
- Bharathiya Chitrakala-Irupatham Noottandil, D C Books, 2021
- Authenticating Objectivity: Paintings of Dr A R Poduval, Kerala Lalithakala Akademi, 2010
- Chitrakala: Charihravum Riithikalum, 2007
- A brief survey of the art scenario of Kerala, 2007
- Puzhhayude Nattariv, D C Books, 2008
- Kanayi Kunhiraman, 2008
- K. Madhavamenon : Prakrithi, Lavanyam, Dharsanam, Kerala Lalithakala Akademi, 2012
- Sthalam, Kaalam Kala, 2006

Vijayakumar Menon translated into Malayalam several plays by western playwrights. These include:

- The Chairs by French dramatist Eugène Ionesco
- Blood Wedding by Spanish dramatist Federico García Lorca
- The Maids by the French dramatist Jean Genet
