= Jagannath Panda =

Indian artist

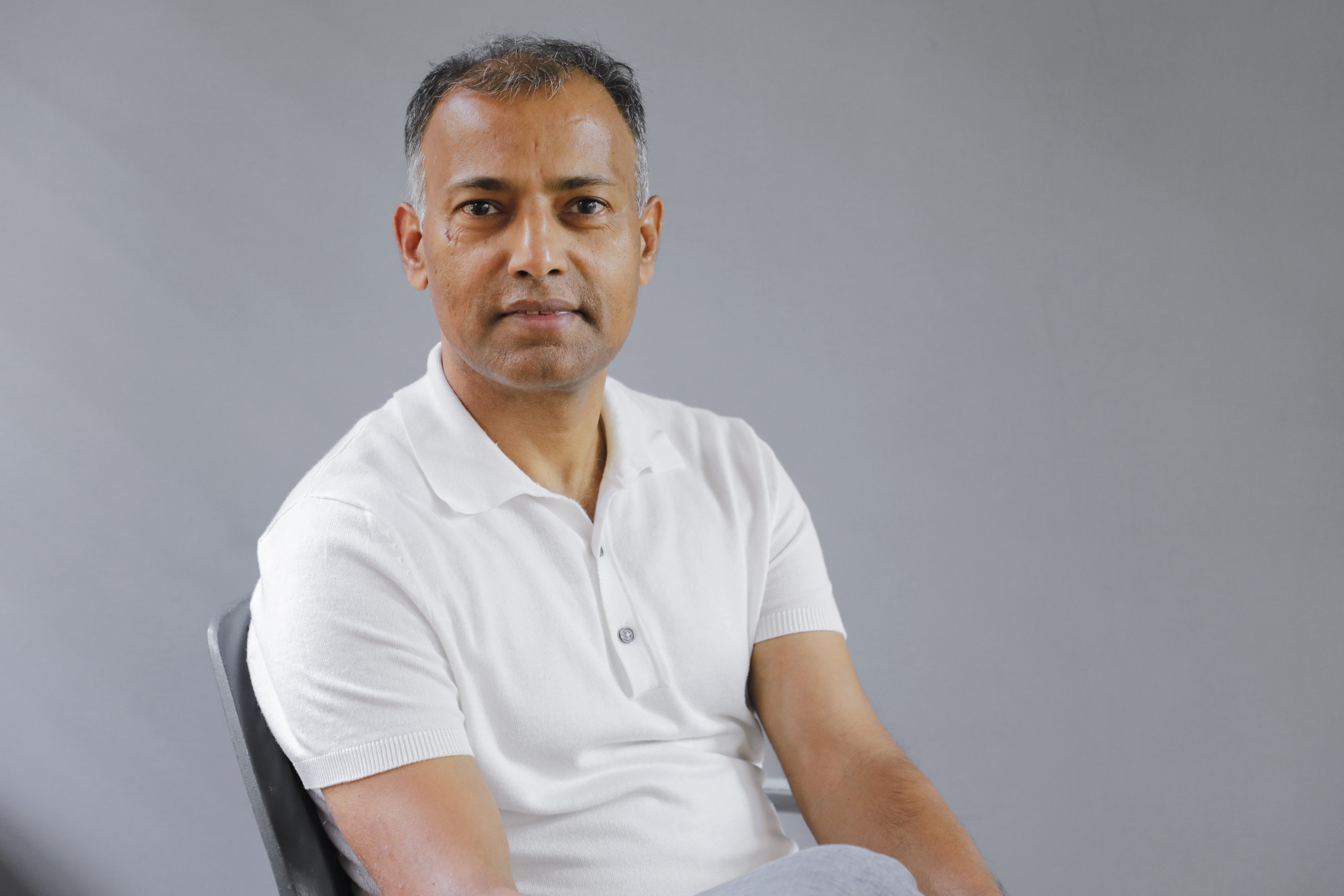
- Born: 1970 (age 55–56); Bhubaneswar, Odisha, India
- Education: Maharaja Sayajirao University of Baroda, Royal College of Art
- Known for: Painting, sculptor, Visual Arts

Jagannath Panda is an Indian artist, painter and sculptor from Gurgaon, Haryana, India. He has exhibited his paintings many cities across India.

== Life ==
Jagannath Panda was born in Kotilingi, a small town near Bhubaneswar, Odisha, India in 1970. His father was a temple priest. After completing his Bachelor in Fine Arts at the BK College of Art and Crafts, Bhubaneswar, he moved to Maharaja Sayajirao University of Baroda, Vadodara to complete his master's in sculpture. On receiving Japan Foundation scholarship, he joined the Fukuoka University of Education, Japan as a research fellow, studying there during 1997–1998. In 2002, he graduated MA in Sculpture from the Royal College of Art, London.

He lives in New Delhi, India.

== Style ==
Panda's work, writes Sundhya Walther, "combines influences from Odissi artistic traditions with images and contexts from his adopted home, Delhi. His pieces are concerned with the daily experiences of modern life in India, but he imbues these representations with a utopian sensibility, expressed through a deliberate beauty that eschews much of the darkness usually associated with contemporary representations of urban life in India, in visual art and in literature."

== Selected exhibitions ==
- Za Moca Foundation Gallery, Tokyo (1998)
- Galley Chemould, Mumbai (2000)
- Nature Morte at Hungarian Information and Cultural Centre, New Delhi (2000)
- Hockney Gallery, RCA London (2002)
- Nature Morte, New Delhi (2005)
- Berkeley Square Gallery, London (2006)

== Awards ==
Panda received the Lalit Kala Akademi Award in 1990 and the All India Fine Arts and Crafts Society Award in 1996.
