= Rajesh S. V. =

Indian archaeologist

- Occupation: Archaeologist
- Employer(s): University of Kerala, Thiruvananthapuram
- Known for: Indus Valley Civilisation excavations
- Awards: Field Discovery Award

Rajesh S. V. is an Indian archaeologist based in Thiruvananthapuram, Kerala. He is known for leading various successful archaeological expeditions in Gujarat and Kerala.

== Education and career ==
Rajesh received a Ph.D. from Maharaja Sayajirao University of Baroda in Gujarat. He is a member of the faculty at the University of Kerala.

== Discoveries ==
Rajesh led the team that discovered the Indus Valley Civilisation necropolis in Khatiya, Gujarat. He was also instrumental in unearthing the Harappan settlement in Padta Bet near Khatiya. Rajesh has led many archaeological expeditions in Kutch and specialises in aspects that concern ceramics.

Rajesh was a leader of the team that discovered megalithic burial cists in Poothangara in Enadimangalam gram panchayat of Pathanamthitta, Kerala.

== Honours ==
Rajesh won the Field Discovery Award given by the Institute of Archaeology at the Chinese Academy of Social Sciences, Shanghai University. He received the medal at the fifth Shanghai Archaeology Forum (SAF).

== Works ==
Kailashnath Hetu. Essays on Prehistory, Protohistory and Historical Archaeology. Published: 2017. Publisher: New Bharatiya Book Corporation. Editors: G. Ajit Kumar, G. S. Abhayan, S. V. Rajesh.

Human and Heritage. An Archaeological Spectrum of Asiatic Countries. Published: 2019. Publisher: New Bharatiya Book Corporation. Editors: Ehsan Rahmath Ilahi, G. S. Abhayan, Preeta Nayar, S. V. Rajesh.

The Archaeology of Burials. Examples from Indian Subcontinent. Published: 2020. Publisher: New Bharatiya Book Corporation. Editors: Ehsan Rahmath Elahi, G. Ajit Kumar. Contributors: G. S. Abhayan, S. V. Rajesh.

== Advocacy ==
Rajesh has helped educate villagers to get them involved in excavations given their knowledge of local conditions. He has also raised awareness to help protect important archaeological sites from industrialization. Rajesh has participated in workshops to popularize archaeology.
