= Vinayak Pandurang Karmarkar =

Indian sculptor (1891–1967)

- विनायक पांडुरंग करमरकर
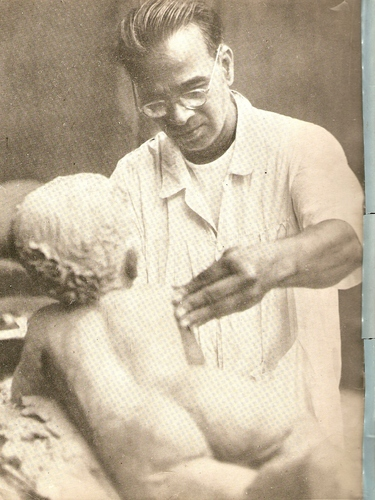
- Born: 2 October 1891; Sasavne, Alibag, Bombay Presidency, British India
- Died: 13 June 1967 (aged 75); Mumbai, Maharashtra, India
- Occupation: Sculptor

Vinayak Pandurang Karmarkar (विनायक पांडुरंग करमरकर) (1891–1967), popularly known as Nanasaheb Karmarkar was an Indian artist, famous for his sculptures. He is best known for his statues of Chhatrapati Shivaji Maharaj. Karmarkar Museum of Sculpture has been set up at his house in Sasawane village near Alibag. Located 18 kms from on Alibaug-Rewas Road, Maharashtra, India, is a museum where sculptors made by Late Mr. Nanasaheb Karmarkar are displayed in his own bungalow. There about 150 beautifully carved sculptures displayed here.

== Early life ==
His father was a farmer and a bit inclined to music. Vinayak used to carve Ganesh idols during Ganesh festival. Vinayak who used to paint his house walls and make small idols from clay. He was fond of making sculptures right from his childhood. He once made a painting of Chatarapati Shivaji Maharaj on a horse on the walls of the Ram Mandir, which was well appreciated by the Villagers and the District Collector Mr. Otto Rothfield, who later enrolled him in the Sir Jamsetjee Jeejebhoy School of Art in Mumbai. He topped the exams and was awarded ‘Lord Mayo’ Medal. The most famous among his other sculptures are 'Shankha-Dhwani', 'Matsya-Kanya' and 'Humjoli'. His style was realistic

== Awards and honours ==
1964 - awarded Padma Shri by the Government of India.

1964 - awarded Fellowship by Delhi Lalit Kala Academy
