= Khanderao Market =

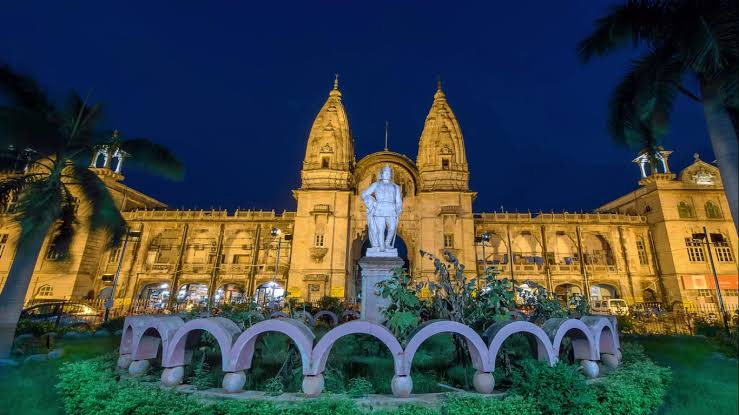
- Khanderao Market at night
- Interactive map of the Khanderao Market area

General information
- Architectural style: Indo-Saracenic architecture
- Location: Vadodara, Chamaraja Road, Vadodara, Gujarat, India
- Coordinates: 22.2966°N 73.2015°E
- Year built: 1906–07
- Cost: ₹300,000
- Client: Maharaja Sayajirao Gaekwad III
- Owner: Vadodara Municipal Corporation

Height
- Height: 86 feet

Technical details
- Material: Brick, mortar, stone
- Floor count: 2

Design and construction
- Architect: Robert Chisholm

The Khanderao Market is a palatial commercial building located on Chamaraja Road in Vadodara, Gujarat, in western India. It was erected by Maharaja Sayajirao Gaekwad III in 1906–07 as a gift to the city municipality to mark the silver jubilee of his administration. The offices of the Vadodara Municipal Corporation are located here.

== History ==
The market was built by Maharaja Sayajirao Gaekwad III in 1906–07 and named after his predecessor and his adoptive father Khanderao Gaekwad, Maharaja of Baroda (1856–1870). It was presented by him as a gift to the city municipality to mark the silver jubilee of his administration. It was built at the cost of about ₹3 lakh (equivalent to ₹10.0 crore or US$1.2 million in 2023).

The offices of the Vadodara Municipal Corporation are located here. Fresh vegetables and flower markets are also located in the back garden.

== Architecture ==
The market was designed in Indo-Saracenic style by English architect Robert Chisholm before his return to England. The two-storey building has two bays connected by an overhead passage with a large central dome rising to the height of 86 feet. Both bays are 70 feet long and 34 feet wide with a cloister around it. It is constructed from bricks and mortar and clad with Dhrangdhra stones. The 16 stalls on ground floor of the main building are occupied by municipal offices while other stalls on two sides are used by 192 shops. The open courtyard between these two sides is 181 feet long and 156 feet wide and has a central junction.

The main gate takes inspiration from the gate of Dabhoi Fort while the domes are inspired by Hindu temples and arches are influenced by Islamic architecture. The perforated stone screens are similar to that of Agra.

The statue of Khanderao in the courtyard was sculpted by Vinayak Pandurang Karmarkar and was inaugurated by Sayajirao Gaekwad III on 23 December 1935.
