= Vadodara Municipal Corporation =

Local civic body in Vadodara, Gujarat, India

Vadodara Municipal Corporation વડોદરા મહાનગરપાલિકા Vaḍōdarā Mahānagarapālikā
- Emblem of the Vadodara Municipal Corporation

Type
- Type: Municipal Corporation

History
- Founded: July 1950; 76 years ago

Leadership
- Mayor: Pinky Soni, BJP
- Deputy Mayor: Chirag Barot, BJP
- Municipal Commissioner: Arun Mahesh Babu, IAS
- Chairperson of the Standing Committee: Dr. Shital Mistry

Structure
- Seats: 76
- Political groups: Government (69): BJP (69); Opposition (7): INC (6); Independent (1)
- Length of term: 5 years

Elections
- Last election: 26 April 2026
- Next election: 2031

Motto
- ઉદ્યોગ સ્વ-સહાય સેવા (Gujarati) (Handwork, self-reliance, service)

Meeting place
- Khanderao Market, Vadodara

Website
- Vadodara Municipal Corporation

The Vadodara Municipal Corporation (VMC) is the governing civic body of the city of Vadodara in the Indian state of Gujarat.

Established in July 1950 under the Bombay Provincial Corporation Act, 1949, the VMC is responsible for the civic infrastructure, urban planning, and public administration of the city and its surrounding suburbs. Governing a population of over 2 million and an area of 220 km², the corporation has historically been a pioneer in implementing civic technology in Gujarat, including automated street light controllers and the issuance of green municipal bonds.

== History ==
The civic administration of Vadodara has its roots in the visionary leadership of the Gaekwad dynasty. Prior to Indian independence, the city's civic affairs were managed under the Baroda State. Maharaja Sayajirao Gaekwad III was instrumental in laying the foundation for a modern municipality, introducing underground drainage, planned markets, and piped water supply via the Ajwa reservoir in the late 19th and early 20th centuries.

Following the integration of Baroda State into the Union of India, the modern Vadodara Municipal Corporation was established in July 1950 under the Bombay Provincial Corporation Act, 1949 (which was later adopted by the Gujarat government upon the state's formation in 1960). The corporation was set up to streamline civic operations and provide democratic representation to the residents of Vadodara.

== Administration ==
The governing structure of the VMC consists of a political wing and an administrative wing.

The political wing is an elected body of councillors headed by a Mayor. The administrative wing is headed by the Municipal Commissioner, an officer of the Indian Administrative Service (IAS), who wields executive power and is appointed by the Government of Gujarat. The Commissioner is responsible for strategic and operational planning, developing and maintaining civic infrastructure like water supply, roads, and drainage, and efficient delivery of various services. The Commissioner takes decisions on behalf of the board or the standing committee.

The office of the Vadodara Municipal Corporation is located in the historic Khanderao Market on Chamaraja Road. The road was named after Chamaraja Wodeyar, the Maharaja of Mysore, to earmark his close friendship with Maharaja Sayajirao Gaekwad III.

City officials
Mayor	Pinky Soni
Deputy Mayor	Chirag Barot
Municipal Commissioner	Arun Mahesh Babu, IAS
Chairperson of Standing Committee	Dr. Shital Mistry

== Legislature ==
In order to make the administration of the city convenient, it has been divided into 19 administrative wards across four primary zones (North, South, East, West). For each ward, 4 councillors (also known as corporators) are elected, making a total of 76 seats in the corporation. Out of these, 50% of the seats (38 seats) are reserved for women candidates.

The Corporators among themselves elect a Mayor, who serves as the First Citizen of Vadodara. The Mayor holds primarily a ceremonial role of representing and upholding the dignity of the city and presiding over the deliberations of the Corporation, while executive powers remain with the Municipal Commissioner.

As is the case with Legislative Bodies, the elections for electing the Corporators are held every 5 years. The previous elections were held on 26 April 2026.

== Current members ==
The 19 wards of the Vadodara Municipal Corporation and their councillors following the 2026 elections are listed below. The Bharatiya Janata Party maintained its stronghold, winning 69 seats, while the Indian National Congress won 6, and 1 seat went to an independent.

Mayor: Pinky Soni
Deputy Mayor: Chirag Barot
Zone	Ward No.	Ward Name / Areas Covered	Councillor	Party
North	1	Sayajigunj, Fatehgunj, MS University	Ami Ravat	Indian National Congress
North	1	Sayajigunj, Fatehgunj, MS University	Pushpa Waghela	Indian National Congress
North	1	Sayajigunj, Fatehgunj, MS University	Jaha Desai	Indian National Congress
North	1	Sayajigunj, Fatehgunj, MS University	Harish Patel	Independent politician
North	2	Harni, Warasia, Sawad, Shweta Park	Rashmika Vaghela	Bharatiya Janata Party
North	2	Harni, Warasia, Sawad, Shweta Park	Varsha Vyas	Bharatiya Janata Party
North	2	Harni, Warasia, Sawad, Shweta Park	Bhanji Patel	Bharatiya Janata Party
North	2	Harni, Warasia, Sawad, Shweta Park	Manoj Patel	Bharatiya Janata Party
East	3	Waghodia Road, Bapod, Kapurai	Snehal Patel	Bharatiya Janata Party
East	3	Waghodia Road, Bapod, Kapurai	Rupal Shah	Bharatiya Janata Party
East	3	Waghodia Road, Bapod, Kapurai	Vikas Thakkar	Bharatiya Janata Party
East	3	Waghodia Road, Bapod, Kapurai	Nilesh Rathod	Bharatiya Janata Party
East	4	Karelibaug, Sangam, VIP Road	Pinky Soni	Bharatiya Janata Party
East	4	Karelibaug, Sangam, VIP Road	Rakhi Shah	Bharatiya Janata Party
East	4	Karelibaug, Sangam, VIP Road	Ajit Dadhich	Bharatiya Janata Party
East	4	Karelibaug, Sangam, VIP Road	Parimal Bhatt	Bharatiya Janata Party
West	5	Raopura, Dandia Bazar, Mandvi	Hitendra Patel	Bharatiya Janata Party
West	5	Raopura, Dandia Bazar, Mandvi	Prafula Jethva	Bharatiya Janata Party
West	5	Raopura, Dandia Bazar, Mandvi	Ketan Brahmbhatt	Bharatiya Janata Party
West	5	Raopura, Dandia Bazar, Mandvi	Shilpa Patel	Bharatiya Janata Party
West	6	Akota, Gotri, Hari Nagar	Dr. Sheetal Mistry	Bharatiya Janata Party
West	6	Akota, Gotri, Hari Nagar	Hemisha Thakkar	Bharatiya Janata Party
West	6	Akota, Gotri, Hari Nagar	Chirag Barot	Bharatiya Janata Party
West	6	Akota, Gotri, Hari Nagar	Shruti Surti	Bharatiya Janata Party
North	7	Nizampura, Chhani, TP-13	Bandish Shah	Bharatiya Janata Party
North	7	Nizampura, Chhani, TP-13	Bhumika Rana	Bharatiya Janata Party
North	7	Nizampura, Chhani, TP-13	Dinesh Choksi	Bharatiya Janata Party
North	7	Nizampura, Chhani, TP-13	Meera Patel	Bharatiya Janata Party
North	8	Nagarwada, Karelibaug (part)	Rajesh Prajapati	Bharatiya Janata Party
North	8	Nagarwada, Karelibaug (part)	Meenaba Chauhan	Bharatiya Janata Party
North	8	Nagarwada, Karelibaug (part)	Sonal Rajput	Bharatiya Janata Party
North	8	Nagarwada, Karelibaug (part)	Sunil Solanki	Bharatiya Janata Party
North	9	Ajwa Road, Kishanwadi	Shailesh Patil	Bharatiya Janata Party
North	9	Ajwa Road, Kishanwadi	Jyoti Dave	Bharatiya Janata Party
North	9	Ajwa Road, Kishanwadi	Rakesh Patel	Bharatiya Janata Party
North	9	Ajwa Road, Kishanwadi	Nita Mistry	Bharatiya Janata Party
West	10	Subhanpura, Gorwa, Laxmipura	Nitin Donge	Bharatiya Janata Party
West	10	Subhanpura, Gorwa, Laxmipura	Bhavna Kakadiya	Bharatiya Janata Party
West	10	Subhanpura, Gorwa, Laxmipura	Dhaval Parmar	Bharatiya Janata Party
West	10	Subhanpura, Gorwa, Laxmipura	Priti Bhatt	Bharatiya Janata Party
West	11	Vasna-Bhayli, Diwalipura	Jigeesha Sheth	Bharatiya Janata Party
West	11	Vasna-Bhayli, Diwalipura	Kedar Bhalerao	Bharatiya Janata Party
West	11	Vasna-Bhayli, Diwalipura	Sangita Patel	Bharatiya Janata Party
West	11	Vasna-Bhayli, Diwalipura	Rakesh Sevak	Bharatiya Janata Party
South	12	Makarpura, Maneja, GIDC	Dharmesh Patanwadiya	Bharatiya Janata Party
South	12	Makarpura, Maneja, GIDC	Ranjita Rathwa	Bharatiya Janata Party
South	12	Makarpura, Maneja, GIDC	Suresh Patel	Bharatiya Janata Party
South	12	Makarpura, Maneja, GIDC	Meenakshi Parmar	Bharatiya Janata Party
East	13	Wadi, Ghadiali Pole, Khanderao	Alpa Patel	Indian National Congress
East	13	Wadi, Ghadiali Pole, Khanderao	Balkrishna Patel	Indian National Congress
East	13	Wadi, Ghadiali Pole, Khanderao	Jagruti Kaka	Bharatiya Janata Party
East	13	Wadi, Ghadiali Pole, Khanderao	Manish Desai	Bharatiya Janata Party
East	14	Tarsali, Soma Talav, Danteshwar	Hasmukh Patel	Bharatiya Janata Party
East	14	Tarsali, Soma Talav, Danteshwar	Neha Yadav	Bharatiya Janata Party
East	14	Tarsali, Soma Talav, Danteshwar	Dattatreya Shinde	Bharatiya Janata Party
East	14	Tarsali, Soma Talav, Danteshwar	Pallavi Kadam	Bharatiya Janata Party
East	15	Bapod, Ajwa Road (Outer)	Aashish Joshi	Bharatiya Janata Party
East	15	Bapod, Ajwa Road (Outer)	Kalpana Patel	Bharatiya Janata Party
East	15	Bapod, Ajwa Road (Outer)	Sanjay Rajput	Bharatiya Janata Party
East	15	Bapod, Ajwa Road (Outer)	Usha Mishra	Bharatiya Janata Party
South	16	Kishanwadi, Soma Talav	Chandrakant Shrivastav	Indian National Congress
South	16	Kishanwadi, Soma Talav	Alka Patel	Indian National Congress
South	16	Kishanwadi, Soma Talav	Kamlesh Parmar	Bharatiya Janata Party
South	16	Kishanwadi, Soma Talav	Suman Solanki	Bharatiya Janata Party
South	17	Manjalpur, Atladra, Bill-Chapad	Yogesh Patel	Bharatiya Janata Party
South	17	Manjalpur, Atladra, Bill-Chapad	Hansa Patel	Bharatiya Janata Party
South	17	Manjalpur, Atladra, Bill-Chapad	Ketan Patel	Bharatiya Janata Party
South	17	Manjalpur, Atladra, Bill-Chapad	Seema Mali	Bharatiya Janata Party
South	18	Tandalja, Vasna Road	Kalpesh Patel	Bharatiya Janata Party
South	18	Tandalja, Vasna Road	Artiben Jaiswal	Bharatiya Janata Party
South	18	Tandalja, Vasna Road	Imran Khedawala	Bharatiya Janata Party
South	18	Tandalja, Vasna Road	Shabana Shaikh	Bharatiya Janata Party
South	19	Kapurai-Tarsali (South)	Mahesh Pawar	Bharatiya Janata Party
South	19	Kapurai-Tarsali (South)	Darshna Rajput	Bharatiya Janata Party
South	19	Kapurai-Tarsali (South)	Sanjay Patel	Bharatiya Janata Party
South	19	Kapurai-Tarsali (South)	Heena Mahida	Bharatiya Janata Party

== Finances and Revenue sources ==
The VMC prepares an annual budget catering to the infrastructural and developmental needs of the city. The VMC's budget for the fiscal year 2024-25 stood at an estimated ₹5,300 crore, focusing heavily on roads, storm water drainage, and public transport infrastructure.

In 2024, Vadodara Municipal Corporation marked a financial milestone by successfully raising ₹1 billion through the issuance of five-year green municipal bonds, carrying a coupon rate of 7.90%. The funds raised from these bonds were earmarked for deployment in three significant water pumping and drainage projects aimed at enhancing the efficiency of sewage water disposal in the region.

=== Revenue from taxes ===
Following is the tax-related revenue for the corporation:

- Property tax (one of the largest internal revenue sources)
- Profession tax
- Entertainment tax
- Grants from the State Government of Gujarat and Central Government (including GST compensation and Smart City mission grants)
- Advertisement tax

=== Revenue from non-tax sources ===
Following is the non-tax related revenue for the corporation:

- Water usage charges
- Fees from Documentation services and building permissions
- Rent received from municipal property and auditoriums
- Funds from municipal bonds

== Controversies and criticism ==
The VMC has faced routine criticism during the monsoon seasons due to severe waterlogging issues in low-lying areas. The corporation's handling of the Vishwamitri River's floodplains has frequently come under scanner by environmentalists and citizens alike. Unchecked encroachments and inadequate storm-water drain desilting have been blamed for the recurring floods in 2019 and 2024. Additionally, during heavy floods, the VMC has had to deploy special teams to rescue mugger crocodiles that wash up into residential areas from the river.

The corporation has also received flak for delays in major infrastructure projects, including the prolonged beautification phases of the historic Sursagar Lake and the slow pace of pothole repairs across major city arterial roads following the monsoons.

== Achievements ==
The VMC received the inaugural BEE award for "Energy Conservation in Street Lighting" in 2008. The award was given in recognition of the city's outstanding achievements in energy efficiency within its street lighting system on 14 December 2008, by the Union Power Minister. The VMC repeated history again in 2010, by acquiring a second award for 'Energy Conservation in Street Lighting’ from the BEE.

The Corporation is the first in the country to implement international level lighting, life cycle cost, and intelligent street light controllers, with GSM monitoring and controlling systems, manufactured by a local company to provide good service to citizens, remote data collection, and quick maintenance.

== See also ==
- List of urban local bodies in Gujarat
- Surat Municipal Corporation
- Ahmedabad Municipal Corporation
