= Madhuvana Mysore Royal Cemetery =

Cemetery in Karnataka, India

Coordinates: 12.2939°N 76.6582°E

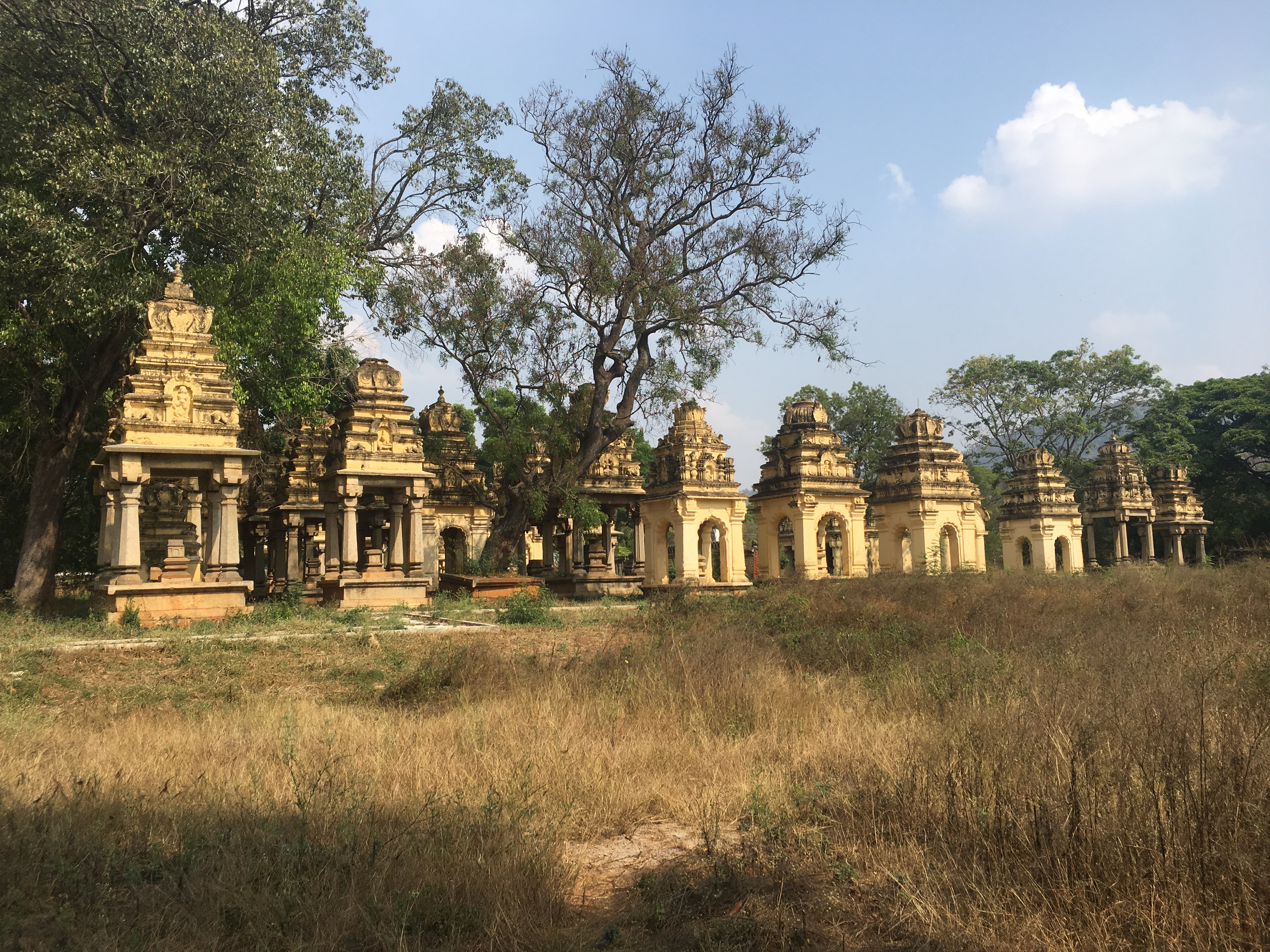
Madhuvana Mysore Royal Cemetery, March 2020

Madhuvana Mysore Royal Cemetery (Kannada: ಮೈಸೂರಿನ ರಾಜವಂಶಸ್ಥರ ಸಮಾಧಿ ಮಧುವನಕ್ಕೆ ಜೀರ್ಣೋದ್ಧಾರ) is a site in Mysuru where many members of the Wadiyar royal family were cremated. It is located on Mysuru-Nanjangud road, and is on five acres of land. It is also known as "Khasa Brindavan", or "private garden". The cemetery is in the process of becoming a tourist attraction.

== History ==
The history of Madhuvana dates back to the 18th century. The name Madhuvana means "land of honey". Most of the twenty-five Wadiyar kings who ruled during the Yadu (Wadiyar) dynasty were cremated there. When the royals were cremated, they would use sandalwood logs for the pyre. Then, the site was covered by a carved structure with architecture similar to a temple with ornate pillars and doors. The tombs (Brindavanas) are an example of cross-cultural influence from Islamic and Christian tradition.

== Notable cremations ==
Lakshmammanni, the third wife of Immadi Krishnaraja Wadiyar, was one of the first to be cremated at the Madhuvana. Maharaja Mummadi Krishnaraja Wadiyar died in 1868 and was cremated there and the tomb is at the entrance. Nalwadi Krishnaraja Wadiyar, Yuvaraja Sri Kanteerva Narasimharaja Wadiyar, and their mother Vani Vilasa Sannidana, the dowager queen, all have tombs in the same row. The twenty-fifth and final king Jayachamarajendra Wadiyar also was cremated here with his tomb at the entrance. In 2013, the cremation of the scion of Mysore royal family Srikantadatta Narasimharaja Wadiyar was performed there. The last to be cremated was Vishalakshi Devi, daughter of Sri Jayachamaraja Wadiyar in 2018 during Dasara.

== Temples ==
Kashi Vishwanatha, Ganapathy and Kalamma temples are the three temples located at the cemetery, and idol worship is active.

== Restoration ==
Previously, the tourism department attempted to make the site a tourist destination, as did the royal family. However, it was neglected due to Hindu traditions where the son involved with the cremation and women from the royal family were not allowed to enter the cremation grounds.

In 2019, a cleanup of the cemetery was initiated to help it become a tourist attraction. This was under the guidance of the HH Srikantadatta Narasimharaja Wadiyar (SDNRW) Foundation. The tombs in Madhuvana are cleaned and painted every two years, and an assigned person cleans the temples and cemetery.
