= Cheluvamba Hospital =

Coordinates: 12.314119°N 76.649329°E

Cheluvamba Hospital for Women & Children
- Government of Karnataka
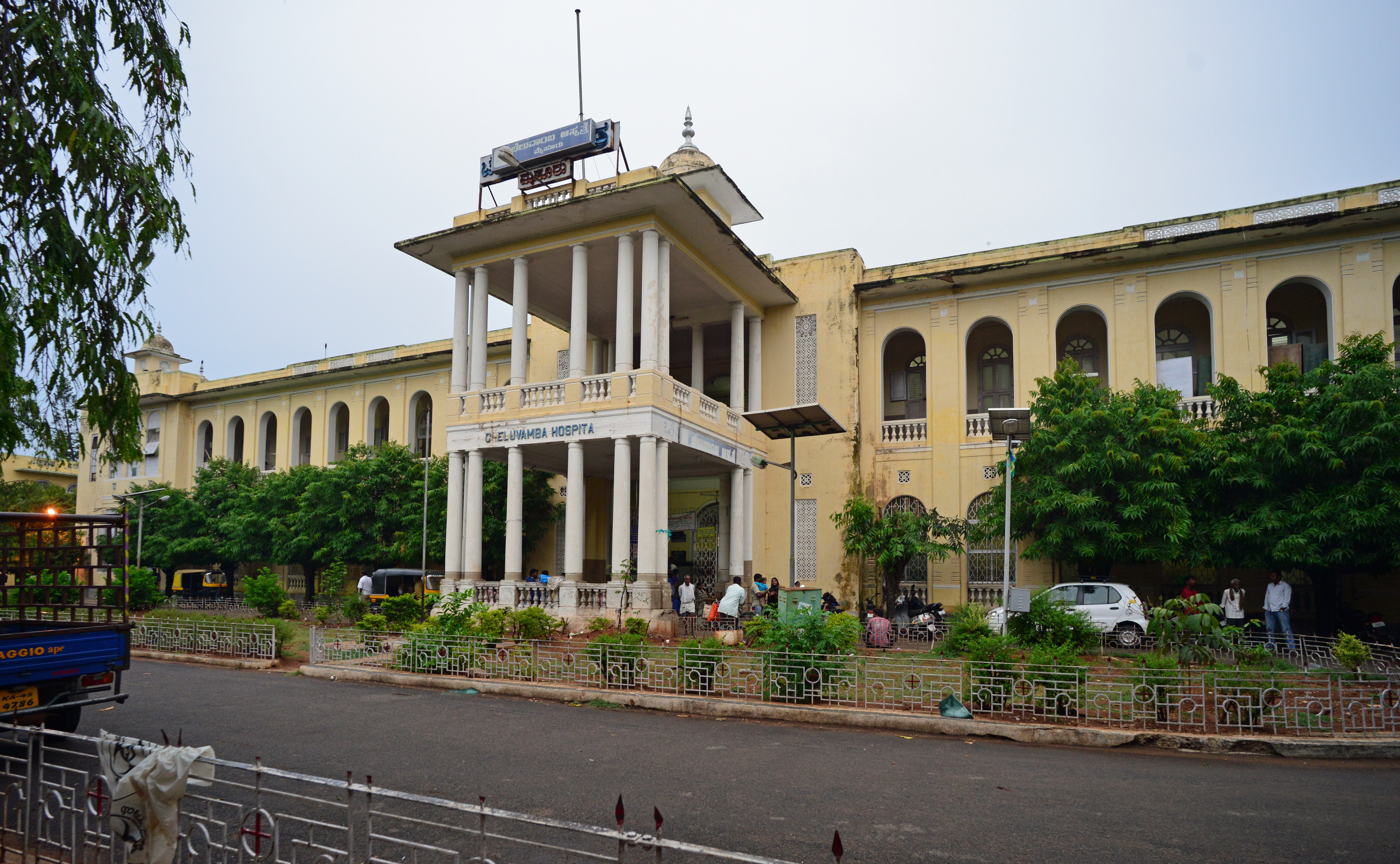

Geography
- Location: Irwin Road, Mysore, Karnataka, India

Organisation
- Care system: Public
- Type: Teaching, Women & Children's
- Affiliated university: Mysore Medical College & Research Institute

Services
- Standards: National Accreditation Board for Testing and Calibration Laboratories
- Emergency department: Yes

Links
- Website: http://cheluvambahospital.com/

Cheluvamba Hospital for Women and Children (formerly Vanivilas Hospital) in Mysore, India, was established in 1889 by Nalwadi Krishnaraja Wadiyar. It is a tertiary referral center and teaching hospital attached to the Mysore Medical College and Research Institute. It is located on Irwin Road, in Mysore opposite the medical college and in the same campus as Krishnarajendra Hospital.

The hospital offers services to obstetrics, gynecology and paediatric patients, and has specialized units providing neonatal care, paediatric surgery, diarrhoeal diseases treatment, immunizations and others. It has about 410 beds including 130 pediatric beds and 280 beds in obstetrics and gynecology and also has a designated neonatal ward and a diarrhoeal diseases unit. About 40–45 babies are delivered here each day. There are two neonatal intensive care units (NICU) accommodating 30 infants at a time. The hospital's out-patient department sees 500 to 600 out-patients from Mysore and surrounding districts every day.

== See also ==
- List of Heritage Buildings in Mysore

== Sources ==
- "Well-equipped Cheluvamba hospital delivers the best". The Times of India. 11 November 2012.
- "Cheluvamba Hospital". Mysore Medical College.
