= Chamarajendra Wadiyar X =

Maharaja of Mysore from 1868 to 1894

- Chamarajendra Maharaja X
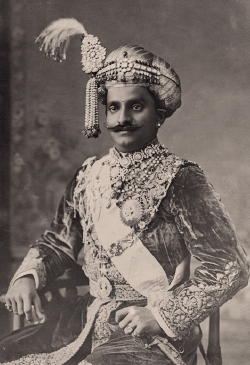
- Photograph of Chamarajendra Wadiyar X

23rd Maharaja of Mysore
- Reign: 23 September 1868 – 28 December 1894
- Coronation: 23 September 1868
- Predecessor: Krishnaraja Wadiyar III
- Successor: Krishna Raja Wadiyar IV
- Born: 22 February 1863; Chamundi Hills, Mysore Kingdom (present-day Karnataka, India)
- Died: 28 December 1894 (aged 31); Calcutta, Bengal Presidency, British India (present-day Kolkata, West Bengal, India)
- Spouse: Kempananjammanni Devi
- Issue: Krishna Raja Wadiyar IV, Kanteerava Narasimharaja Wadiyar, Jayalakshmi Ammanni, Krishnaraja Ammanni, Chaluvaja Ammanni, Krishnajammanni
Names
- Chamarajendra Wadiyar Bahadur X
- House: Wadiyar dynasty
- Father: Sardar Chikka Krishnaraj Urs; Krishnaraja Wodeyar III (grandfather)
- Mother: Rajkumari Sri Putta Ammanni
- Religion: Hinduism

Chamarajendra Wadiyar X (22 February 1863 – 28 December 1894) was the twenty-third Maharaja of Mysore between 1868 and 1894.

== Early life ==
Chamarajendra Wadiyar X was born in the old palace in Mysore on 22 February 1863, as the third son of Sardar Chikka Krishnaraj Urs of the Bettada-Kote Urs branch of the Wadiyar dynasty. His father died about a week before his birth. His mother, Rajkumari Putammani Devi, was the eldest daughter of Krishnaraja Wadiyar III, then Maharaja of Mysore. As the king did not have a male heir, he adopted Chamarajendra as his official heir on 18 June 1865, which was later recognised by the British Raj on 16 April 1867.

== Reign ==
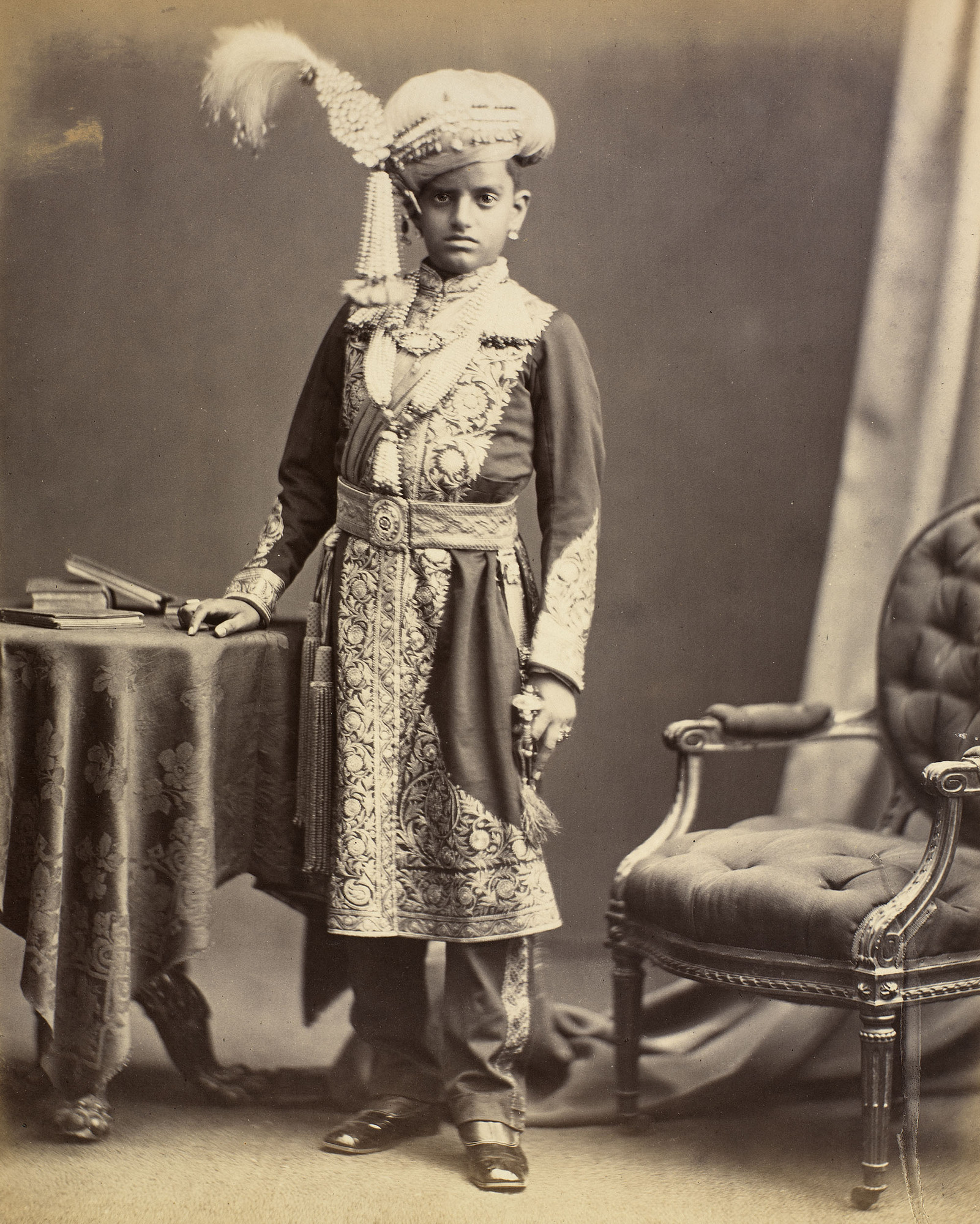
Chamarajendra Wadiyar X in 1877

Krishnaraja Wadiyar III died on 27 March 1868, and Chamarajendra Wadiyar X ascended the throne at the Mysore Palace on 23 September 1868. However, since 1831, the Kingdom of Mysore had been under the direct administration of the British Raj via Mysore Commission, which had earlier deposed Krishnaraja Wodeyar III on allegations of misrule. Later, the Privy Council of the United Kingdom ordered the reversal of the Company's decision, and the princely state of Mysore was reconstituted and restored to the Wadiyar dynasty by an instrument of rendition in 1881. Chamarajendra Wadiyar X, who was groomed to take charge of the administration, and was officially handed the reins in the same year.

During his brief reign, he was aided by dewans C. V. Rungacharlu (1881–1883) and K. Seshadri Iyer (1883–1901). He instituted the Mysore Representative Assembly in 1881, one of the earliest legislative institutions in princely India. He sponsored the journey of Swami Vivekananda to Chicago in 1893. He founded the Kannada Bashojjivini School and instituted several industrial schools. The annual Dasara Industrial Exhibition was established, and he facilitated the founding of agricultural banks to help finance farmers, and life insurance for government employees.

== Death and succession ==
Chamarajndra Wadiyar died of diphtheria, in Calcutta, on 28 December 1894, aged 31. He was succeeded by his ten-year-old son, Krishna Raja Wadiyar IV. His wife, Kempananjammanni Devi, served as regent of Mysore till their son came of age.

== Family ==
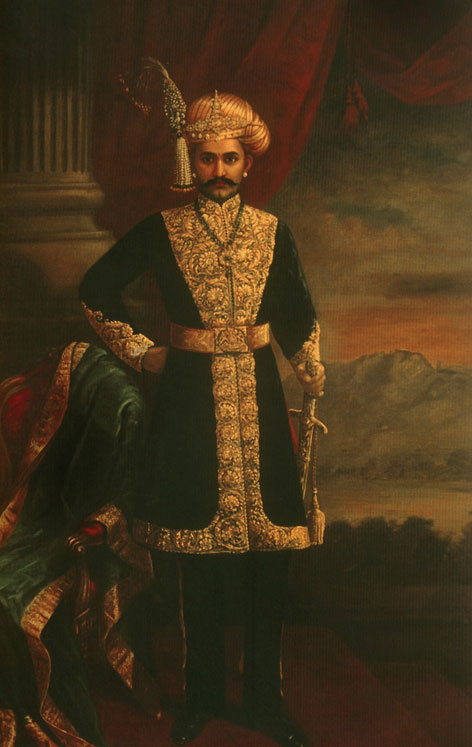
Portrait of Chamarajendra Wadiyar X by Raja Ravi Varma, 1885

In May 1878, Chamarajendra Wadiyar married Kempananjammani Devi, the daughter of an arasu (royalty) of Kalale, a prominent nobleman of Mysore state. They had four sons and three daughters, of whom the following survived to adulthood:

1. Krishna Raja Wadiyar IV, succeeded his father as Maharaja of Mysore.
2. Prince Kanteerava Narasimharaja Wadiyar, father of Maharaja Jayachamarajendra Wadiyar.
3. Princess Jayalakshammani, (1881–1924), married her youngest maternal uncle, M. Kantaraj Urs, who was the Diwan of Mysore between 1919 and 1922, in 1897.
4. Princess Krishnajammani, (1883–1904), married Desaraja Urs, Commander of the Mysore Armed Forces, from the Bagle family of Mogur in Mysore State, in 1896. They had a son and three daughters. She and her three daughters died of tuberculosis, and the Krishnajammanni Sanitorium was built in her memory.
5. Princess Cheluvajammani (1886–1936), married M. Lakshmikanta Raj Urs, a nobleman of Mysore State, in 1900. A maternity hospital and park are named after her.

== Patronage ==
Chamarajendra Wadiyar X was a great patron of arts and music; his court boasted of artists like Veene Subbanna, Veene Sheshanna, Mysore Vasudevachar, Veena Padmanabhaiah, Mysore Karigiri Rao, and Bidaram Krishnappa, among others. The maharaja was a violin virtuoso himself and used to daily provide accompaniment to Veena Subbanna's vocal and Veena Sheshanna's veena performances. His favourite kriti's included Sujana Jeevana and Lavanya Rama. He was also a connaisseur of Javali's Kritis (Javalis are a genre of Carnatic music).

== Places in honour ==
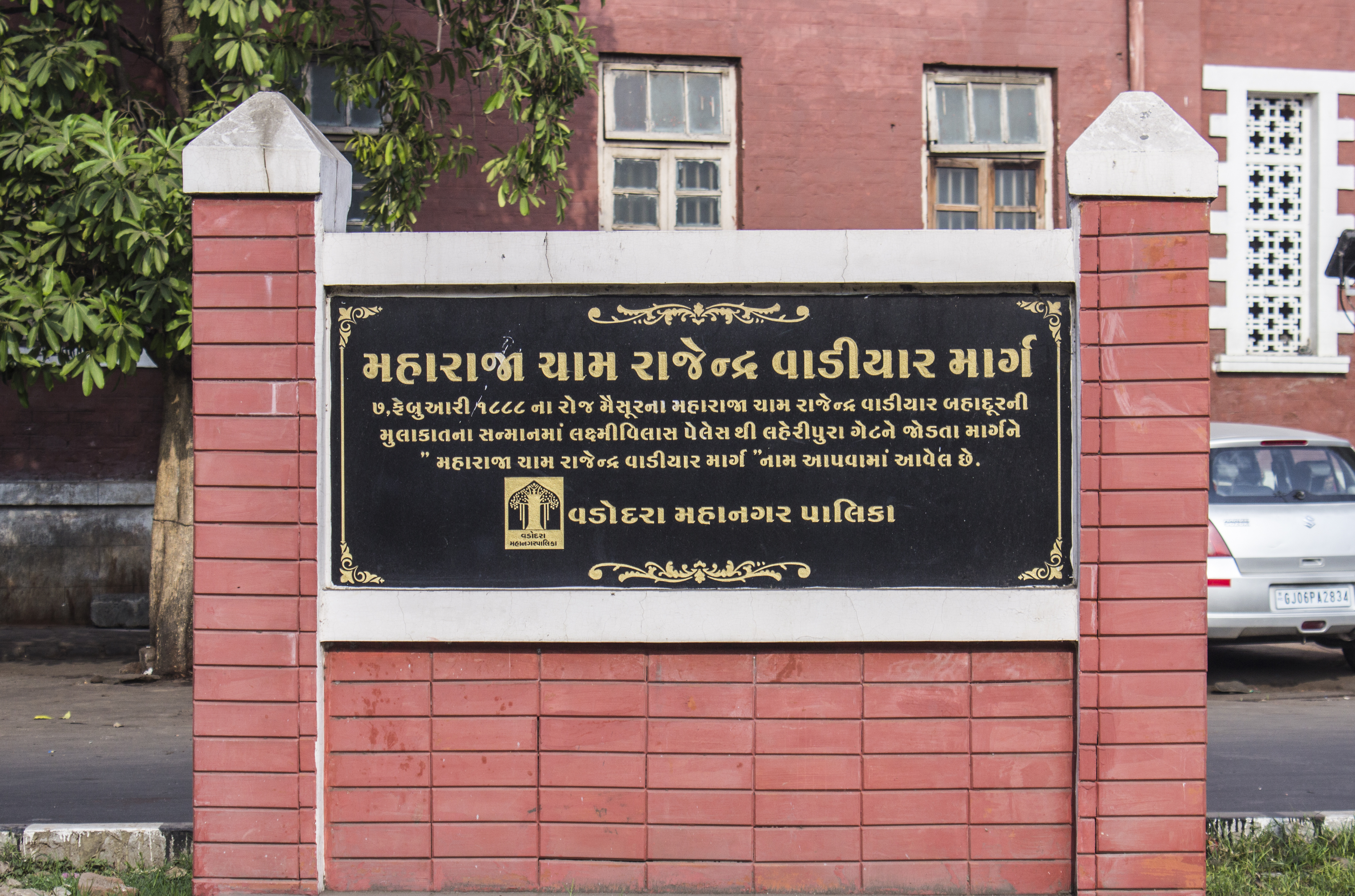
Maharaja Cham Rajendra Wadiyar Marg in Vadodara

Several landmarks in Mysore and Bangalore were built during his reign including the Bangalore Palace and Lalbagh Glass House in Bangalore. He established the Maharaja's College, Mysore (1889), Oriental Research Institute Mysore (1891), Dufferin Clock Tower, and Mysore Zoo, in Mysore, and the Fernhills Palace in Ooty. Places and roads named after him include the Chamaraja Road, Vadodara, Chamaraja (Vidhana Sabha constituency), Chamaraja Road, Mysore, Chamarajpet in Bangalore, and Chamarajapuram in Mysore.
