= Rani Vijaya Devi =

Indian princess and musician (1922–2005)

Vijaya Devi
- Thakurani
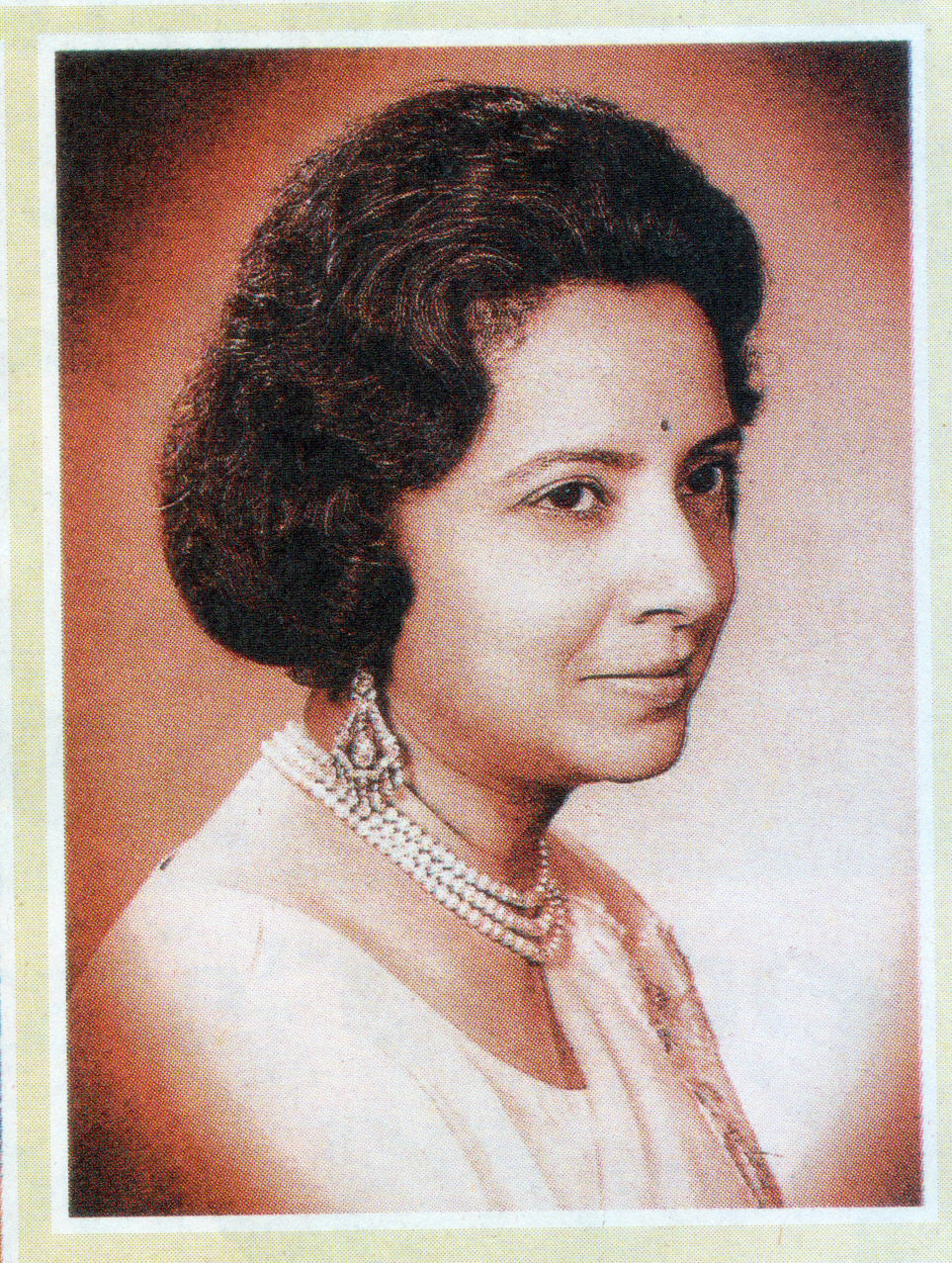
- Born: Vijayalakshmi Devi; 28 August 1922; Mysore Palace, Mysore, India
- Died: 8 December 2005 (aged 83); Bangalore
Names
- Maharajakumari Vijayalakshmi Ammanni Devi
- Father: Kanteerava Narasimharaja Wadiyar
- Mother: Kempu Cheluvaja Ammanni

Vijaya Devi (28 August 1922 - 8 December 2005) was an Indian princess and musician from the Wadiyar dynasty.

== Early life ==
Vijaya Devi was born Yuvarajakumari Vijayalakshmi Ammanni Devi, the eldest daughter of Yuvaraja Kanteerava Narasimharaja Wadiyar and Kempu Cheluvaja Ammanni. She was the eldest sister of Maharaja Jayachamaraja Wadiyar. She grew up in Chamundi Vihar Palace at Mysore.

== Music ==
From an early age, Vijaya Devi was exposed to Carnatic and Western music. She was taught to play veena by Veena Venkatagiriyappa. She also learnt piano from the nuns of Good Shepherd Convent and later from Alfred Mistowsky of Trinity College, London, while he was on a visit to Mysore. In 1939, on a tour to Europe with her father, she met the Russian composer Sergei Rachmaninoff.

Devi was dedicated to the furthering of music. She founded the International Music and Arts Society at Bangalore. The society's patrons include the governors of Karnataka, Rukmini Devi Arundale, S. M. Krishna, and her own nephew Prince Srikantadatta Narasimharaja Wadiyar.

== Personal life ==
Vijaya Devi married Thakore Saheb Pradyumna Singh Himant Sing, the ruler of Kotda-Sangani, in 1941. With the marriage, she assumed the new title Rani Saheb. After India's Independence, the thakore joined the new Indian Foreign Service. The couple moved to New York in 1947. While there, she studied at the Juilliard School of Music under Eduard Steuermann.

The couple had four daughters: Gita Devi Nath, Usha Devi Malavi, Urmila Devi, and Shakuntala Devi; and five grandchildren: Akshay Malavi, Priyam Malavi, Udaya Nath, Hanumant Nath, and Anishaa Taraporvala.

== Death ==
She died on 8 December 2005 at Bangalore.
