= D Subbaramaiah =

Indian Carnatic singer (1904–1986)

- Born: 1904; Bangalore, Karnataka
- Died: 16 August 1986 (aged 81–82)
- Known for: Carnatic music

D Subbaramaiah (1904 – 16 August 1986) was an Indian Carnatic vocalist.

== Career ==
Subbaramaiah was a Carnatic vocalist.

Subbaramaiah founded the Karnataka College of Music in 1933 and trained students. It is said to be the first ever institutions in Karnataka exclusively for teaching music and the first music college to be recognized and aided by the Government. .

Subbaramaiah participated in several music conferences and presided over the music conference in Bidaram Krishnappa’s Prasanna Seetharama Mandiram, Mysore, in 1960. He also took part in various music-related discussions and examination boards. He also sang in the courts of Mysore King Krishnaraja Wodeyar IV.

Subbaramaiah is often remembered during various Carnatic music festivals and similar occasions.

He died on 16 August 1986.
