= M. Kantharaj Urs =

Indian royal, civil servant and administrator

Rajasevadhurina Sardar Sir M Kantharaj Urs CSI KCIE

20th Dewan of Mysore
- In office 1918–1922
- Monarch: Krishna Raja Wadiyar IV
- Preceded by: Mokshagundam Visvesvarayya
- Succeeded by: A. R. Banerjee

Personal details
- Born: Maddur Kanthraj Urs; 20 September 1870
- Died: 3 October 1923 (aged 53) Bangalore
- Education: Madras Christian College
- Profession: Civil servant

Sir Maddur Kantharaj Urs (20 September 1870 – 3 October 1923) was an Indian royal, civil servant, and administrator who served as the 20th Dewan of Mysore from 1918 to 1922.

== Early life and education ==
Kantharaj Urs was born on 20 September 1870 to Narasaraja Urs and Kempananjammanni, the Maddur Urs branch of the Kalale Wadiyar dynasty. His older sister was Maharani Kempananjammanni Devi.

He studied at Madras Christian College from 1892 to 1893 and graduated with distinction. He was the first member of the Ursu community to attain this distinction.

== Career ==
In 1894, Kantharaj Urs was appointed Probationary Assistant Commissioner (Schedule II) in the Mysore civil service. After the untimely death of his brother-in-law Maharaja Chamaraja Wadiyar X in December 1894, his sister became the Queen Regent of Mysore in 1895. She appointed him her Special Assistant and Private Secretary from 1895 to 1899.

In 1918, Urs succeeded Sir M. Vishveshwaraya as the Dewan of Mysore to his nephew Maharaja Krishnaraja Wadiyar IV.

== Personal life ==
Kantharaj Urs married his niece Princess Jayalakshami Amanni, the eldest daughter of his sister Maharani Kempananjammani Devi. They had one daughter, Rajakumari Lelavathi. Jayalakshmi Vilas Mansion at Mysore, now part of the University of Mysore, was their residence.

He died on 3 October 1923.
