= Albion Rajkumar Banerji =

Indian civil servant and administrator

Sir Albion Rajkumar Banerji CSI CIE
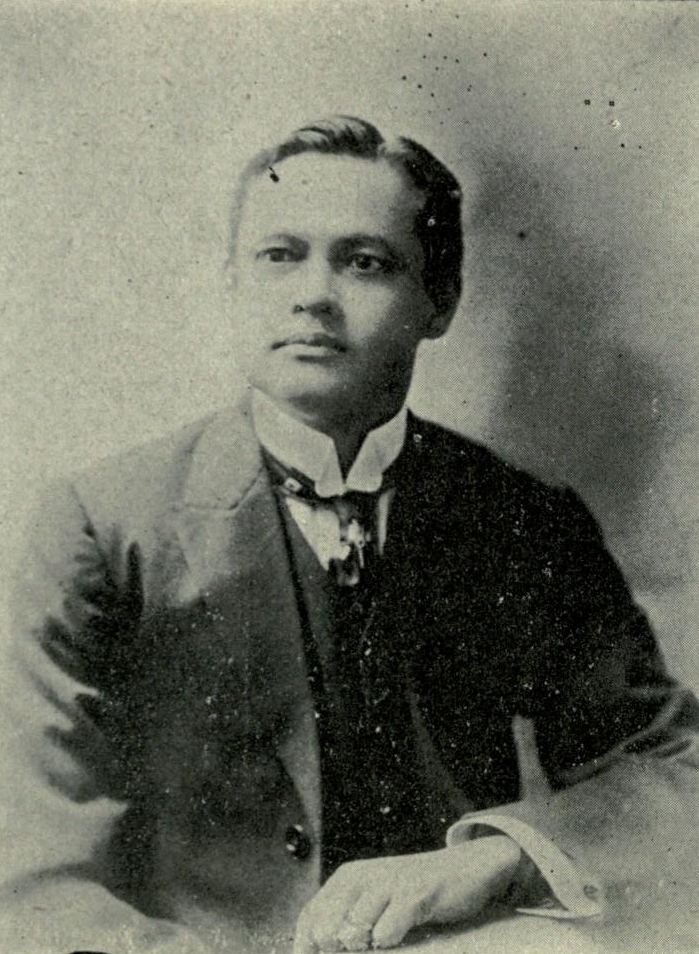
- c. 1911

Prime Minister of Kashmir
- In office 1927–1929
- Monarch: Hari Singh
- Preceded by: Padam Deo Singh
- Succeeded by: G. E. C. Wakefield

21st Diwan of the Mysore kingdom
- In office 1922–1926
- Monarch: Krishna Raja Wadiyar IV
- Preceded by: M. Kantaraj Urs
- Succeeded by: Sir Mirza Ismail

Diwan of Cochin kingdom
- In office 1907–1914
- Preceded by: Nemali Pattabhirama Rao
- Succeeded by: J. W. Bhore

Personal details
- Born: 10 October 1871 Bristol, United Kingdom
- Died: 25 February 1950 (aged 78) Calcutta, India
- Education: University of Calcutta; Balliol College, Oxford
- Occupation: Civil Servant

Sir Albion Rajkumar Banerji Esq. M.A.I.C.S. (10 October 1871 – 25 February 1950) was an Indian civil servant and administrator who served as the Diwan of Cochin from 1907 to 1914, 21st Diwan of Mysore from 1922 to 1926, and as Prime Minister of Kashmir from 1927 to 1929.

== Early life and education ==
Banerji was born in Bristol in the Bengali Brahmo family of Sasipada Banerji. His father was a noted social reformer and labour activist from Baranagar near Calcutta. His mother Rajkumari Banerji was one of the first upper class Indian women to visit England. The family returned to India in 1872 and he was educated at the General Assembly's Institution and graduated from the University of Calcutta. Subsequently, he earned his master's degree at the Balliol College, Oxford and he stood sixth in Indian Civil Services 1894 and joined the service in 1895.

He married Nalini Gupta, daughter of Sir Krishna Govinda Gupta, the 6th Indian to join the ICS, who, towards the end of his distinguished career in the civil service, went to the Secretary of State's Council in London.

== Career ==
=== Magistrate ===
He cleared the Imperial Civil Service examinations in 1894 and was appointed Assistant Collector and Magistrate in the Madras Presidency.

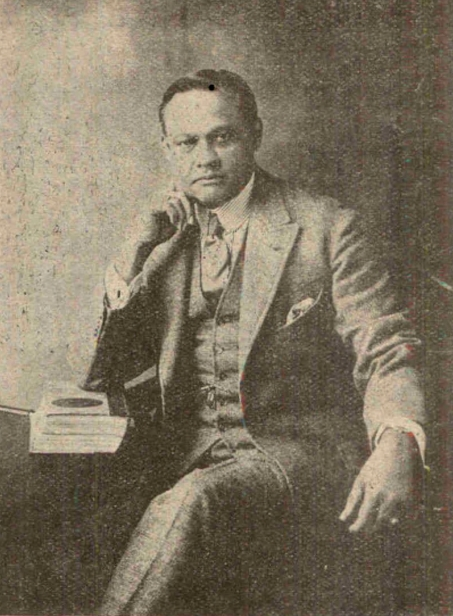
Diwan A. R. Banerji

Foundational Contributions

Sir Albion Rajkumar Banerji Esq. M.A.I.C.S. presented the Diwan's Cup for the inter-school sports held in February 1908.

==== Kingdom of Cochin ====
Banerji Road, named after Sir Albion Rajkumar Banerjee

Banerji was appointed Diwan of Cochin in May 1907 and served till 1914. He introduced The Cochin State Manual.

==== Kingdom of Mysore ====
Banerji became a minister (councillor as they were known) in Diwan Sir M. Visvesvaraya's cabinet in 1914. After the resignation of Visvesvaraya as Diwan, Banerji became the First Councillor in Diwan Sir M. Kantaraj Urs's cabinet. Banerji would have left Mysore service much earlier but ended up as the Diwan of Mysore since Urs resigned owing to ill health. He served as Diwan from 1922 to 1926. In 1923, he sought the help of Brajendranath Seal to create a constitution for the Kingdom of Mysore. He signed the 1924 Cauvery accord with the Madras Presidency.

==== Kingdom of Kashmir ====
Banerji was appointed the first and only prime minister of Kashmir in 1927 to Maharaja Hari Singh. He resigned in 1929 over differences with maharaja on the grounds of his lavish lifestyle sustained by a poor population. His wrote:

Jammu and Kashmir state is labouring under many disadvantages, with a large Mohammedan population absolutely illiterate, labouring under poverty and very low economic conditions of living in the villages, and practically governed like dumb driven cattle. There is no touch between the government and the people, no suitable opportunity for representing grievances... The administration has at present no or little sympathy with people's wants and grievances...

== Publications ==
- Indian Affairs (a quarterly journal published from London).
- Indian Tangle (Hutchinson—London)
- Indian Path-Finder (Kemp Hall Press—Oxford)
- Rhythm Of Living (Ryder & Co -London)
- Looking Ahead in Wartime (Harmony Press-London)
- What is Wrong with India (Kitabistan—Allahabad)
- Through an Indian Camera (Bangalore Press)

== Honours ==
- Companion of the Order of the Indian Empire (1912)
- Companion of the Order of the Star of India (1921 Birthday Honours)
- Knighthood (1925 Birthday Honours)
