= Maharani's Science College for Women, Mysore =

Coordinates: 12.310379°N 76.643520°E

Maharani's Science College for Women
- Type: College
- Established: 1917
- Affiliations: University of Mysore
- Administrative staff: nn(teaching), nn (non-teaching)
- Location: Mysore, Karnataka, India
- Campus: Urban
- Website: gfgc.kar.nic.in/mscw-mysore

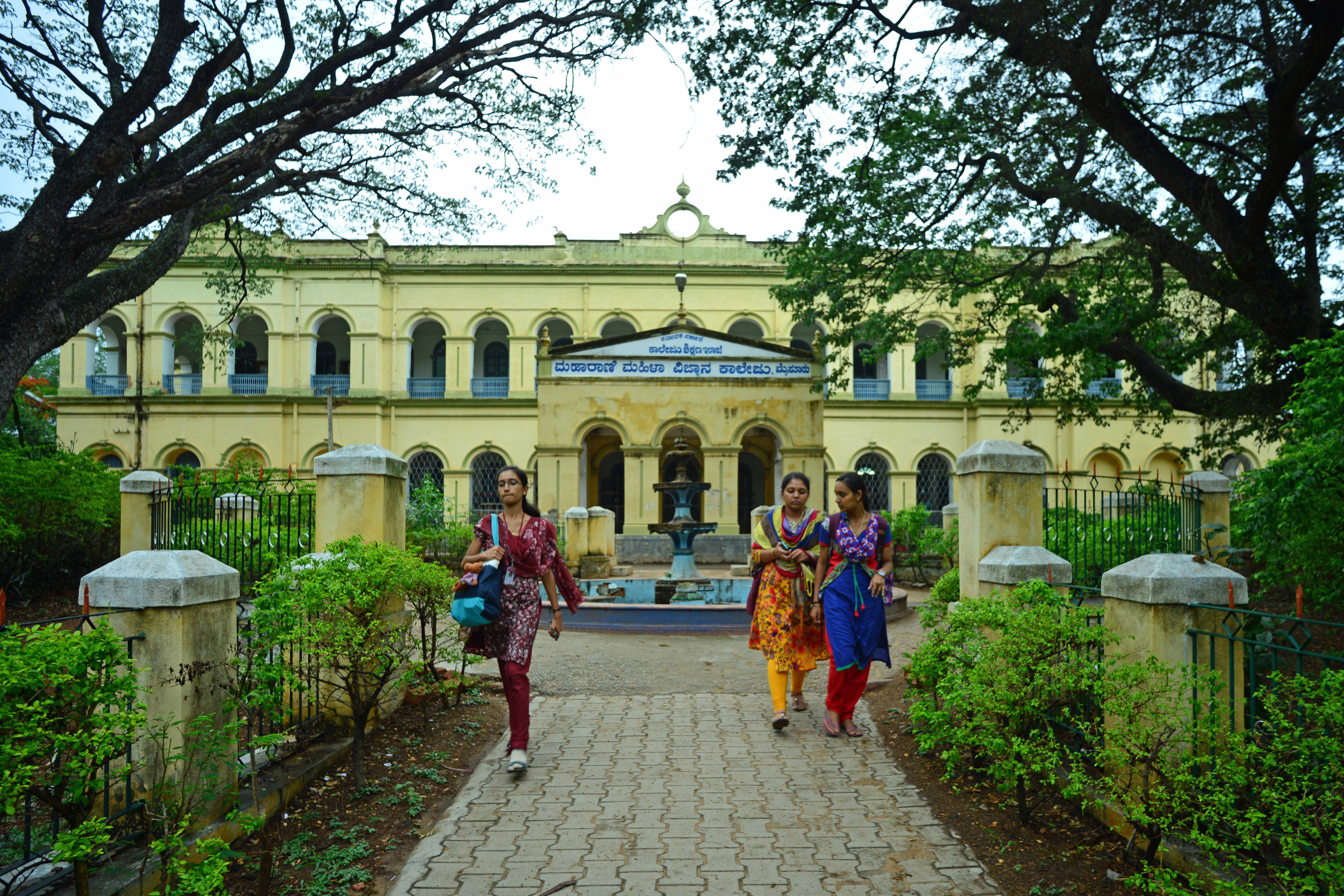
Maharanis College, Mysore

Maharani's Science College for Women in Mysore was established in 1917 by the Queen Regent of Mysore, Kempa Nanjammani Vani Vilasa Sannidhana the mother of Krishna Raja Wadiyar IV. Since its inception the college has held an important place in promoting women's education. Originally the college offered both Arts and Science education at undergraduate level but in 1979 what was formerly just the Maharani's College for Women was bifurcated into the Maharani's Science College for Women and the Maharani's Arts College for Women to accommodate the growing number of students.

Maharani's Science College for Women is affiliated to the University of Mysore and is under the administrative control of Department of Collegiate Education, Government of Karnataka and the University of Mysore. The college has 15 science and 5 language (Kannada, Hindi, Sanskrit, Urdu and English) departments and offers 20 course combinations, in addition there is an integrated degree course in Home Science. The college offers both undergraduate and postgraduate courses including BSc degrees in physics, biochemistry, chemistry, computer science, electronics, and statistics; and MSc degrees in biochemistry, mathematics, botany, microbiology, chemistry, physics, and applied zoology.

Financial assistance is provided by the government of Karnataka, the University Grants Commission, and the College Development Council.

== See also ==
- List of Heritage Buildings in Mysore

== Sources ==
- "Maharani's Science College for Women: Proposal for Autonomous Status" (PDF). Department of Collegiate Education, Karnataka. 2013.
- "About Us". Maharani's Science College for Women.
