= Sasipada Banerji =

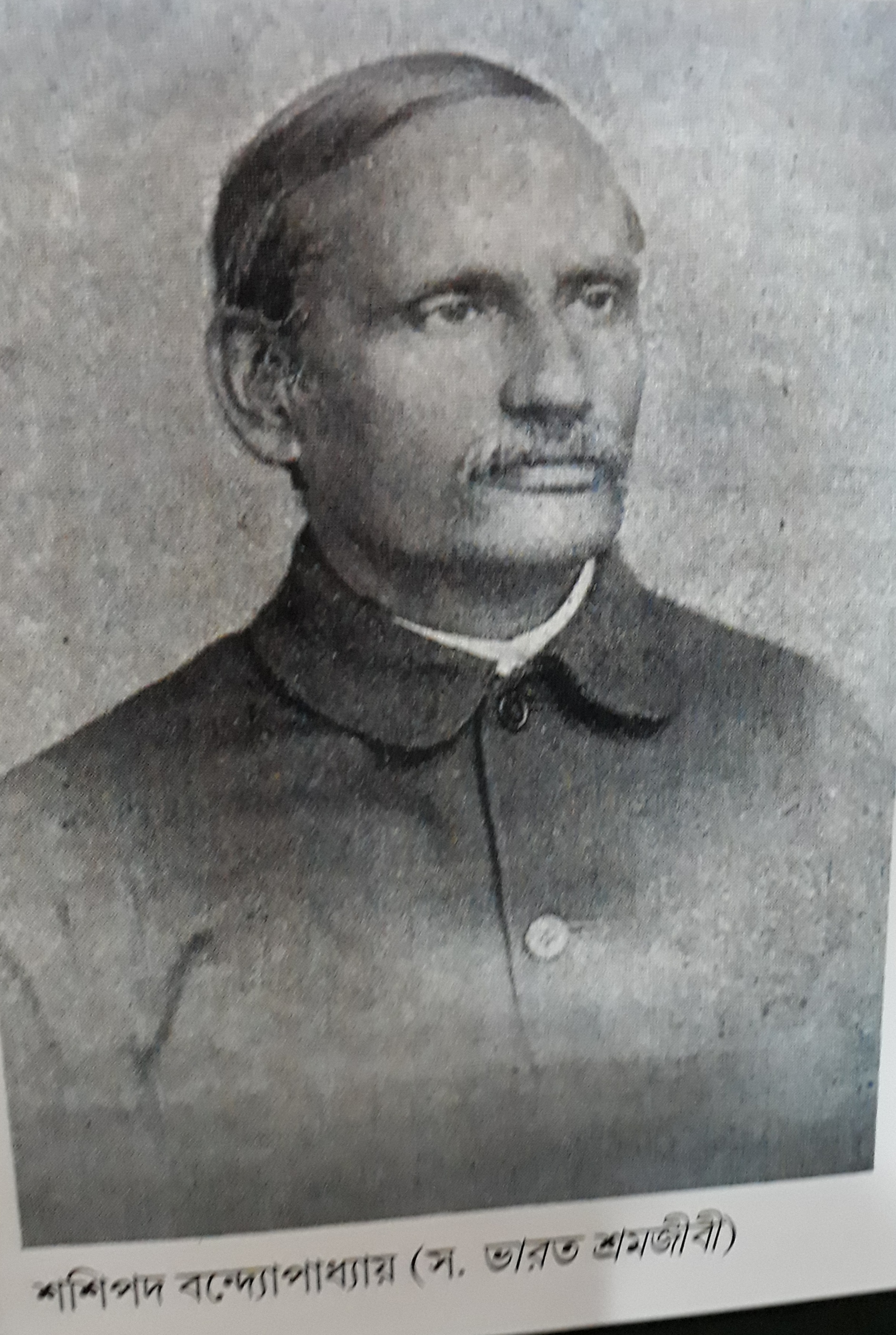
- Born: 2 February 1840.
- Died: 15 December 1924 (aged 84)
- Children: Albion Rajkumar Banerjee

Shasipada Banerjee (also referred to as Sasipada Banerji, Shashipada Bandhopadhyay) (2 February 1840 – 15 December 1924) was a teacher, social worker and leader of the Brahmo Samaj who is remembered as a champion of women's rights and education and as one of the earliest workers for labour welfare in India. He was the founder of several girls' schools, a widow's home, temperance societies, a workers' organisation and the editor of the journal Bharat Sramajibi.

== Life and family ==
Shasipada Banerjee was born in 1840 at Baranagar near Kolkata (then Calcutta). His father's name was Rajkumar Bandyopadhyay who was a school teacher. Sasipada married Rajkumari Banerjee (née Devi), then a thirteen-year-old girl, in 1860 and taught her to read and write within a year. In his early career, Sasipada taught in school in Salkia as well as was involved in Temperance movement, and Brahmo Samaj. He was a major proponent of widow marriage.

In 1871 Shashipada travelled with his wife to London. While on the trip, their son, Albion Rajkumar Banerjee was born. Albion went on to become a member of the Indian Civil Service and served as Diwan of Cochin. Rajkumari died in 1876 and Shasipada remarried the following year to a widow..

== Brahmo leader ==
Banerjee became involved in the social reform movement in Bengal through the Brahmo Samaj which he joined in 1861. Banerjee was an advocate of women's rights and education. He promoted the establishment of schools to train women teachers, organised several widow remarriages and established a Widows' Home at Baranagar in 1887. He founded girls' schools in 1865 and 1871 and later established an institute for their higher education. Banerjee is credited with founding the first women's journal named 'Antapur' in Bengali which was headed by his two daughters and run exclusively by a team of women.

== Temperance movement and visit to England ==
Banerjee was a member of the Temperance movement in India and was a close associate of Mary Carpenter whom he first met during her visit to India in 1866. On her invitation, Shasipada and Rajkumari paid a return visit to England in 1871. His decision to visit England was met with approbation in Bengal (as it would involve them crossing the oceans, an act that would lead to the Banerjis' loss of caste) and Banerjee and Rajkumari were stoned when they paid a visit to his ancestral home before leaving for Britain. The Asiatic of London declared in 1872 that Rajkumari was "the first Hindu lady who has ever visited England". The couple had their first-born child, a son, while in England whom they name Albion.

During the visit, Shasipada spoke at several meetings of the National Temperance League. At one such meeting, he accused British rule of introducing the hitherto alien vice of intemperance to Hindu society. He also met and was received by a large number of common people and dignitaries including the Secretary of State for India during this visit. In England he became a member of the Good Templars Body and also of the Order of the Day Star Lodge and attended meetings of the National Indian Association and helped establish its branches in other British cities.

== Labour Movement ==
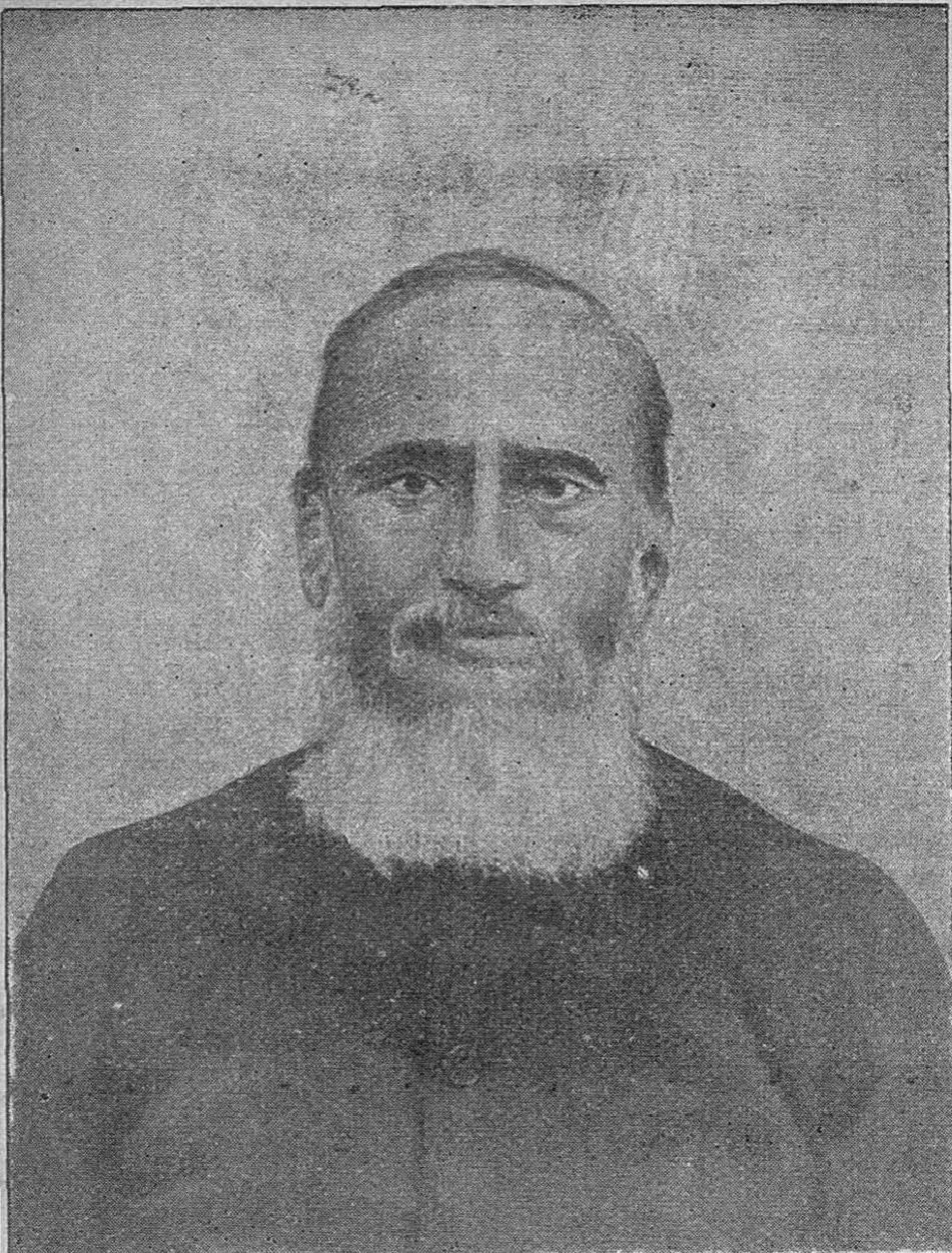
Sasipada Banerji in 1911

Shasipada Banerjee was among the earliest Indians to work for the rights of the labour class in India, the Working Men's Club he established in 1870 has been described as the first labour organisation in Kolkata. The Brahmo Samaj established a Working Men's Mission in 1878 and established several schools for working men and the depressed classes and Banerjee founded the Baranagar Institute the same year. In 1870 he founded the workers' organisation Sramajivi Samiti and established the newspaper Bharat Sramajivi. The Bharat Sramajivi was the first Indian journal of the working class and its circulation peaked at 15,000 copies a remarkable number for its time. Banerjee's contributions to the welfare and upliftment of the working class have however been criticised by Sumit Sarkar of being little more than 19th century middle class interest in industrial and plantation labour and of not going beyond the realm of philanthropy. Others like Dipesh Chakrabarty have argued that Banerjee's efforts aimed to create an "ideal working class imbued with bhadralok values" and to create "not only orderly but also noiseless Bengalis for the jute mills".

== Books ==
Shasipada's memoir An Indian pathfinder was compiled by his son Albion and published in 1924. A modern saint of India: A sketch of the religious life of Sevabrata Brahmarshi Shasipada Banerjee is a biography by Satindranath Roy Choudhary.
