= Kanteerava Narasimharaja Wadiyar =

Yuvaraja of Mysore (1888–1940)

Narasimharaja Wadiyar
- Yuvaraja of Mysore
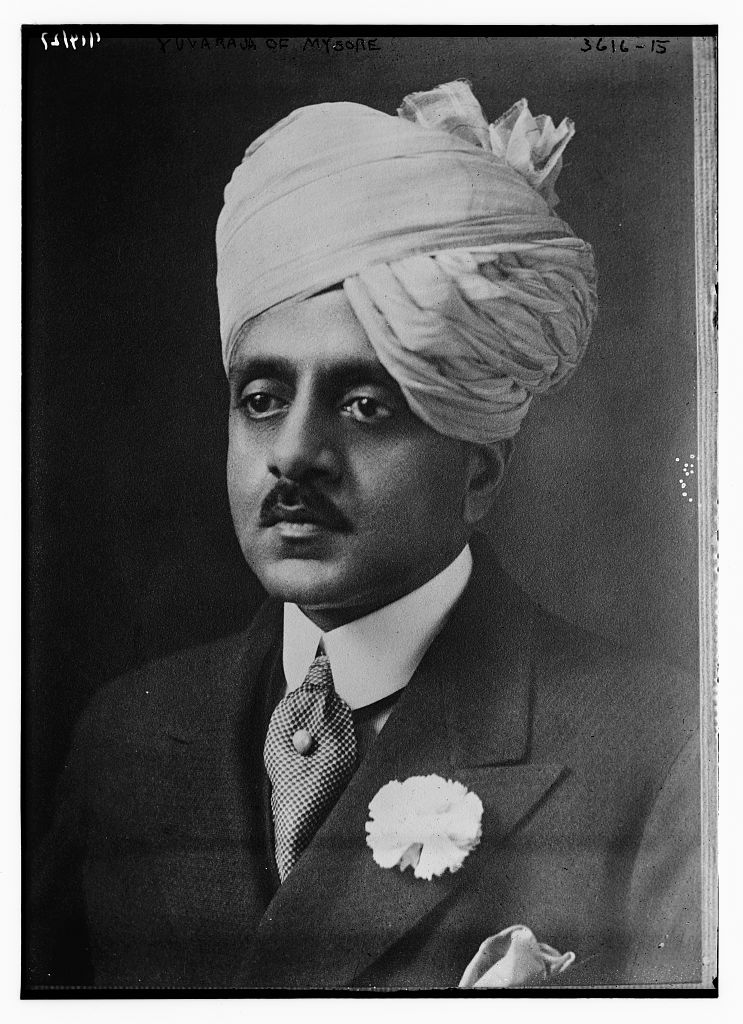
- Kanteerava Narasimharaja Wadiyar
- Born: 5 June 1888; Mysore Palace, Kingdom of Mysore, British India
- Died: 11 March 1940 (aged 51); Bombay, Bombay Presidency, India
- Spouse: Kempu Cheluvaja Ammanni
Names
- Kanteerava Narasimharaja Wadiyar
- House: Wadiyar
- Father: Chamarajendra Wadiyar X
- Mother: Kempa Nanjammani Vani Vilasa Sannidhana

Kanteerava Narasimharaja Wadiyar (5 June 1888 – 11 March 1940) was the heir apparent of the Kingdom of Mysore from 1895 until his death in 1940, during the reign of his brother, Maharaja Krishnaraja Wadiyar IV. Krishnaraja Wadiyar who died less than six months after Narasimharaja Wadiyar did.

== Early life ==
Kanteerava Narasimharaja Wadiyar was born in Mysore Palace, the second son of Maharaja Chamarajendra Wadiyar X and Maharani Kempananjammanni Devi. His father died in 1894, when he was six years of age. His mother served as the Queen Regent of Mysore between 1894 and 1902 during the minority of his elder brother Yuvaraja Krishnaraja Wadiyar IV.

An intelligent student, Wadiyar had his early education at the Private Royal School of Mysore (from the summer palace Lokaranjan Mahal, Mysore). His education and training, like his brother's, was entrusted to Sir Stuart Fraser, Sir P. Raghavendra Rao and others. He was later sent to Mayo College, Ajmer. After becoming very sick during his stay at Mayo College, he returned to Mysore and pursued his studies and training under Cap. Heale. He was granted the personal style of His Highness by Viscount Frederic Thesiger, the Governor-General of India, on 1 January 1918.

Wadiyar was a frequent traveller and public speaker. He was a horseman and played polo alongside his brother for the Mysore team. He had an interest in literature and was a patron of music.

== Family ==
Narasimharaja Wadiyar married Kempu Cheluvaja Ammanni, the daughter of Dalvoy Devaraja Urs, on 17 June 1910. The couple had three daughters: Princesses Vijayalakshmi Devi (late Thakurani Vijaya Devi of Kotda Sangani); Sujayakantha Devi (later Thakurani of Sanand), and Jayachamundi Devi (later Maharani Jayachamundi Sahiba, the Maharani of Bharatpur; and son Maharaja Jayachamaraja Wodeyar, the last reigning Maharaja of Mysore.

Wadiyar died on the morning of 11 March 1940 at the anchorage in Bombay, then property of Mysore. His body was cremated at the Mahim Hindu Crematorium in Mahim the same day. His reigning brother died five months later.

== Honours ==
- King George VI Coronation Medal, 1937
- King George V Silver Jubilee Medal, 1935
- Knight Grand Commander of the Most Honourable Order of the Star of India (GCIE), 1915
- Knight Commander of the Most Exalted Order of the Star of India (KCIE), 1911
- Delhi Durbar Gold Medal, 1911

=== Memorials ===
- Sri Narasimharaja (snr) Hospital, Kolar
- Narasimharajapura, Chikkamagalur
- Kanteerava Narasimharaja Pura, Mysore
- Kanteerava Narasimharaja Wadiyar Sports Club, Mysore
- Kanteerava Indoor Stadium, Bangalore; Sree Kanteerava Stadium, Bangalore
