= Mysore Medical College and Research Institute =

Medical college in Mysore, India

Mysore Medical College & Research Institute
- Type: Government Medical College and Hospital
- Established: 1924; 102 years ago
- Founder: Krishna Raja Wadiyar IV
- Academic affiliations: Rajiv Gandhi University of Health Sciences
- Director: Dr. Mudassir Azeej Khan
- Undergraduates: 250 per annum
- Postgraduates: 127 per annum
- Location: Mysore, Karnataka, India; 12°18′57.1″N 76°38′58.5″E
- Website: mmcri.karnataka.gov.in/english

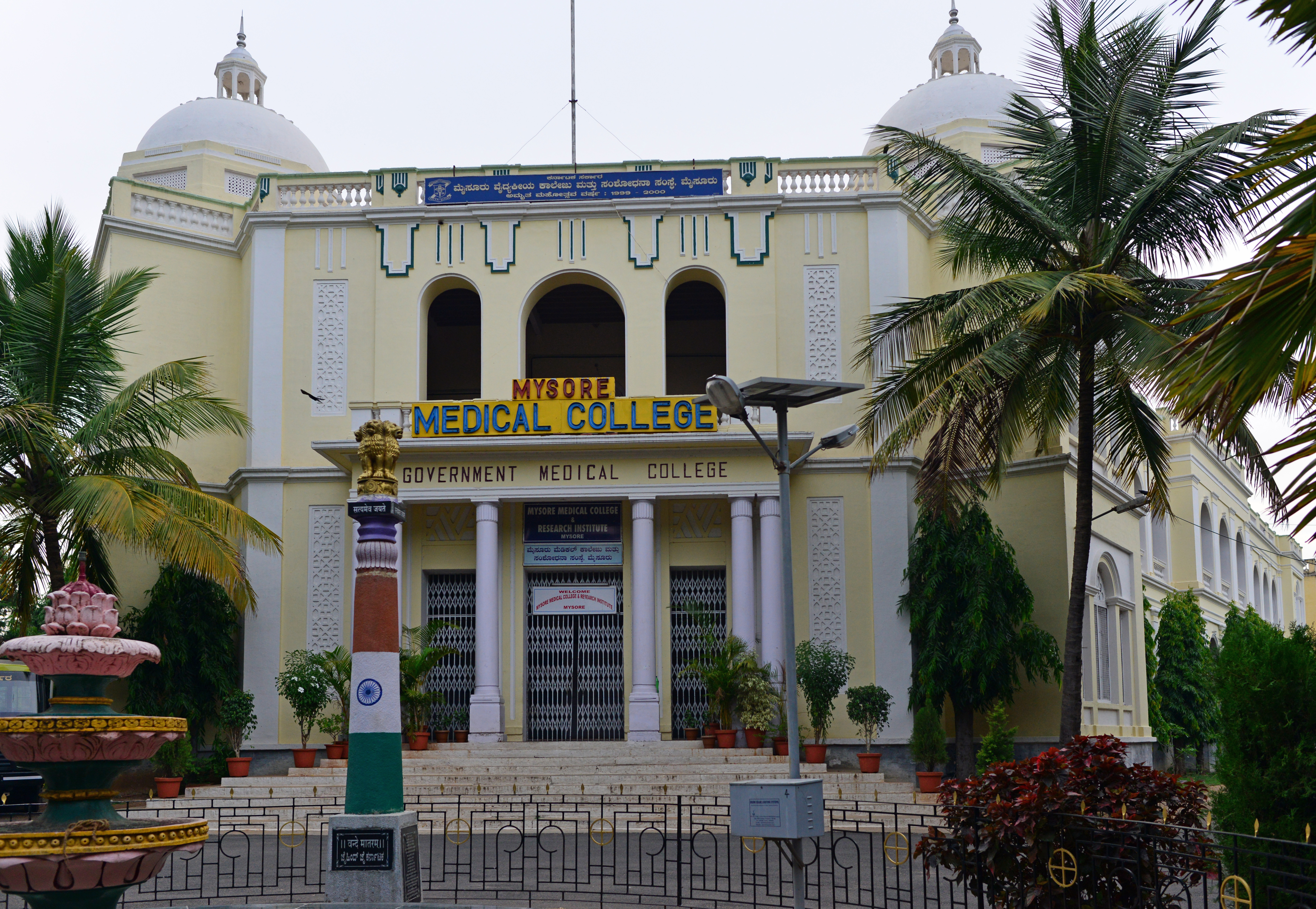
Mysore Medical College & Research Institute

Mysore Medical College and Research Institute (previously called Mysore Medical College, abbreviated MMC), also known as Government Medical College, Mysuru is one of the oldest medical colleges in India. It is located in the heart of the city of Mysuru adjacent to the Mysuru city railway station. Founded in 1924 by Maharaja Krishnaraja Wadiyar IV, it is the first medical college to be established in the Karnataka region and the seventh in India. The college is affiliated to the Rajiv Gandhi University of Health Sciences, Bengaluru.

== History ==
Maharaja Krishnaraja Wadiyar IV founded Mysore Medical College. Since there were no medical institutions in the erstwhile Kingdom of Mysore, a scheme for giving medical education was started in 1881 under which carefully the selected students were given scholarship and sent to places like Madras and Bombay to undergo training and to return and work as "Hospital Assistants".

After the Madras Presidency expressed its inability to admit Mysore State students, the Government of Mysore sanctioned another scheme in April 1917 including a "Mysore Medical School", which was started at Bangalore to train the then called "Sub Assistant Surgeons". Trainees had to undergo a course for 4 years to qualify as a Licensed Medical Practitioner (LMP). In 1924 the "Mysore Medical School" was upgraded and was now called the "Mysore Medical College". The college was affiliated to the University of Mysore and the trainees were now granted medical degrees. Mysore Medical College was the first medical college in the state of Mysore and only the seventh in India at this time. At the request and insistence of Sri Krishnadevaraja Wodiyar the college was shifted from Bangalore to Mysore in 1930.

The foundation stone was laid in 1930 by Sri Krishnadevaraja Wodiyar and the main building was constructed by Boraiah Basavaiah & Sons, a famous contractor of Mysore. It was further expanded in 1940.

The Krishnarajendra Hospital (K R Hospital) was constructed at a cost of Rs. 3,65,000/- and started as a 100 bedded hospital with X-ray apparatus. It is attached to the Mysore Medical College.

The Mysore Medical School continued functioning in Bangalore for a few years and was eventually shut down two years after Bangalore Medical College came into existence in 1954.

Cheluvamba hospital, earlier known as Vanivilas Hospital, was built in 1880 with 24 beds, and was upgraded to a 200-bed hospital in 1939. It was further expanded in 1954 and the new OPD Block of OBG was built in 1997. New facilities have been continuously added onto the existing infrastructure, but the most impressive of all is the new multistoried OPD building with its ultra-modern air-conditioned ICCU which along with the medical wards on upper floors was added onto the K R Hospital complex in 1998. Other relatively new structures include a blood bank and a burns ward. It is attached to the Mysore Medical College.

== Admissions ==
=== Undergraduate ===
The total intake is 250 for MBBS course. The seat is filled through the National Eligibility cum Entrance Test conducted by the National Testing Agency, Government of India.

=== Postgraduate ===
It has intake of 127 seats for PG courses in which 50% is by All India Quota.
