= Rajkumari Banerji =

Rajkumari Banerji or Rajkumari Devi (1847 — 8 March 1876) was an Indian social worker and Bengali philanthropist. She was said to be the first Indian woman to visit England in 1871.

== Family ==
In 1860, Banerji married Sasipada Banerji, a social worker when she was a thirteen-year-old girl. Sasipada taught her to read and write within a year. Her son, Albion Rajkumar Banerji, went on to become a member of the Indian Civil Service and served as Diwan of Cochin.

== Works ==
Banerji made numerous contributions to women's education of Bengal, British India. Initially she was enlightened in modern culture by her husband. She completed her basic education after marriage with the help of her husband and thereafter taught children of her family. She was deeply involved with the social reforms and women's education movement after joining in Brahmo Samaj. Mary Carpenter came to their house in Baranagar, Kolkata and Banerji joined her in working for the development of women's education. In 1871, she went to England with Mary Carpenter and returned to India after eight months. The Asiatic of London declared in 1872 that she was "the first Hindu lady who has ever visited England". All her life she was active in promoting the spread of education, visiting many schools, and encouraging funding for the improvement of female education . Banerji and her husband made a shelter for homeless and poor women in their own house.
