= Mysore Representative Assembly =

Mysore Representative Assembly ಮೈಸೂರು ಪ್ರಜಾ ಪ್ರತಿನಿಧಿ ಸಭೆ Mysuru Praja Pratinidhi Sabhe
- Kingdom of Mysore

Type
- Type: Unicameral (1881–1907); Lower house (1907–1950)
- Houses: Lower house of the Mysore Legislature (with Mysore Legislative Council as upper house)

History
- Founded: 7 October 1881
- Disbanded: 1950
- Succeeded by: Mysore Legislative Assembly

Leadership
- President (Ex-officio): Dewan of Mysore

Meeting place
- Mysore (Dasara session); Bangalore (Budget session from 1916)

The Mysore Representative Assembly (ಮೈಸೂರು ಪ್ರಜಾ ಪ್ರತಿನಿಧಿ ಸಭೆ, Mysuru Praja Pratinidhi Sabhe) was the legislative assembly of the Kingdom of Mysore, an Indian princely state during the British Raj. Established on 7 October 1881 by Maharaja Chamarajendra Wadiyar X and his Dewan C. V. Rungacharlu, it was the first modern representative institution in an Indian princely state. Initially established as a unicameral consultative body, the assembly met annually in Mysore following the Mysore Dasara festival to discuss state policy, review administrative finances, and voice public grievances. The elective principle was introduced in 1891. In 1907, the legislature became bicameral upon the creation of the Mysore Legislative Council as an upper chamber, after which the Representative Assembly functioned as the lower house. Under the constitutional reforms of 1923, the assembly was placed on a permanent statutory footing with powers over taxation, budget proposals, and legislation, as well as an early extension of franchise to women. Following India's independence and the promulgation of the Constitution of India in 1950, the assembly was dissolved and replaced by a provisional body, which became the Karnataka Legislative Assembly following the 1952 general elections.

== History ==
=== Background and foundation (1881) ===
In March 1881, the British Crown restored administrative control of Mysore to the Wadiyar dynasty after fifty years of direct rule by the Mysore Commission, an event termed the "Rendition of Mysore". Chamarajendra Wadiyar X was invested with ruling powers, appointing C. V. Rungacharlu as his Dewan. On 25 August 1881, the Maharaja's administration issued an executive order sanctioning an annual gathering of representative landholders and merchants from across the province. The order noted that the government sought to inform the public of administrative measures and "convince them that the interests of the Government are identical with those of the people". The inaugural session opened on 7 October 1881 in Mysore, immediately after the close of the annual Mysore Dasara festivities. Attended by 144 delegates selected by local fund boards and district deputy commissioners, the meeting heard Dewan Rungacharlu review state finances, agriculture, and proposed public works.

=== Early sittings and the 1887 gazetting ===
Between 1881 and 1886, delegates were selected by district officers and attendance was voluntary. In 1887, Dewan K. Seshadri Iyer promulgated the first formal rules for the conduct of assembly business: a property qualification was introduced, district representation quotas were fixed, recognized public associations were permitted to depute representatives, and the roll of members was officially published in the state gazette for the first time. (Note: Page 82 of the 1929 Mysore Gazetteer (Vol. 4) contains a typographical error stating the Assembly "dates from 1887", but recites in the same paragraph the March 1881 Rendition, the presidency of Dewan Rangacharlu (who died in January 1883), and the founding order of 25 August 1881.)

=== Introduction of the elective principle (1891) ===
In 1890–1891, Dewan Seshadri Iyer introduced the elective principle, making Mysore the first princely state to hold regular elections for a consultative body. Voting and membership rights were granted to landholders paying annual land revenue between ₹100 and ₹300, payers of mohatarfa (local property and trade tax) of ₹13 to ₹17, holders of alienated inam villages yielding at least ₹500 annually, and resident graduates of Indian universities. Salaried government servants were disqualified from membership to preserve non-official independence. In 1894, the tenure of elected members was fixed at three years.

=== Bicameralism and expansion (1907–1922) ===
Under Maharaja Krishna Raja Wadiyar IV, the legislature became bicameral in 1907 with the establishment of the Mysore Legislative Council as an upper chamber. The assembly was granted the right to elect two members to the council, which increased to four in 1920. During the administration of Dewan M. Visvesvaraya, an additional annual sitting known as the "Budget Session" was sanctioned in October 1916. Held each June in Bangalore, it was dedicated to examining state financial estimates. Standing committees were instituted in 1917, followed by the right of interpellation (formal parliamentary questioning) in 1918.

=== Constitutional reforms of 1923 ===
In 1922, the state government appointed a committee on constitutional reform chaired by Sir Brajendranath Seal, Vice-Chancellor of Mysore University. The committee's recommendations formed the basis of Regulation XVIII of 1923, which placed the assembly on a permanent statutory footing. The regulation fixed the membership at 250, with provision to expand to 275. It mandated a minimum of 150 rural representatives from taluks, 30 to 50 from urban municipalities, 35 for minority communities, and 15 for designated interests including the University of Mysore, planting, trade, and mining labour at the Kolar Gold Fields. The assembly acquired statutory rights over finance and legislation: no new tax could be levied without its prior consideration, and the general principles of proposed bills had to be placed before it before introduction in the Legislative Council. Rural voting thresholds were reduced by half to a land revenue payment of ₹25, and franchise was granted to women who met the property qualification.

== Organization and procedure ==
=== Presiding officers and quorum ===
The Dewan of Mysore presided over the assembly ex-officio, with members of the state Executive Council serving as vice-presidents. A quorum required 70 members in addition to the presiding officer. The regular term was three years, subject to a one-year extension by the government during emergencies.

=== Sessions and agenda ===
The assembly met twice a year:

- Dasara Session: Held in Mysore during the Dasara festival (September or October), lasting eight sitting days. It focused on the Dewan's annual policy address, legislative statements, and public representations.
- Budget Session: Instituted by royal rescript in October 1916 and first convened in April 1917, this second annual sitting was subsequently held each June. Lasting six sitting days, it was devoted to the examination of the state budget and financial estimates.

To manage the agenda, rules introduced in 1907 and formalized in 1915 required preliminary conferences to be held in each district under the deputy commissioner before the assembly convened. These meetings examined local petitions, resolving matters within the competency of district officers and selecting up to 50 to 75 subjects of statewide importance for discussion based on member voting. In the assembly, speeches on principal subjects were limited to fifteen minutes and ordinary representations to five minutes.

=== Languages of the House ===
Proceedings in the assembly were conducted in both Kannada and English. The Dewan delivered opening addresses and policy statements in English with Kannada translations provided for members, and delegates had the right to address the chamber in Kannada.
