= List of Jadeja states =

During the medieval and later feudal/colonial periods, many parts of western regions of the Indian subcontinent were ruled as sovereign or princely states by various houses of Jadeja dynasty.

== Salute states ==
| Flag | Name of state | Gun salute | District |
|---|---|---|---|
| | Dhrol State | 9 guns | Jamnagar |
| | Nawanagar State | 13 guns (15 local) | Jamnagar |
| | Cutch State | 17 guns (19 local) | Kutch |
| Rajkot Principality | Rajkot State | 9 guns | Rajkot |
| | Gondal State | 11 guns | Rajkot |
| | Morvi State | 11 guns | Morbi |

== Non-salute states ==
| Name of State | District |
|---|---|
| Khirasara | Rajkot |
| Lodhika | Rajkot |
| Vadali | Rajkot |
| Dhrafa | Jamnagar |
| Kotda Nayani | Morbi |
| Mowa | Rajkot |
| Mulila Deri | Jamnagar |
| Satodad Vavdi | Jamnagar |
| Shishang Chandli | Jamnagar |
| Virvao | Jamnagar |
| Kotda Sangani | Rajkot |
| Malia | Morbi |
| Virpur | Jamnagar |
| Gadhka | Devbhumi Dwarka |
| Gavridad | Rajkot |
| Jalia Devani | Jamnagar |
| Kotharia | Rajkot |
| Makaji Meghpar | Jamnagar |
| Mengani | Jamnagar |
| Pal | Rajkot |
| Bhadwa | Jamnagar |
| Rajpara | Jamnagar |
| Shahpur | Devbhumi Dwarka |
| Santalpur | Banaskantha |
| Kanksiali | Rajkot |
| Chadchat | Banaskantha |

== See also ==
- Lunar Dynasty
- List of Rajput dynasties
- List of princely states of British India (by region)
