= Kempananjammanni Devi =

Maharani of Mysore and regent from 1895 to 1902

Kempananjammani Devi C.I.
- Maharani of Mysore
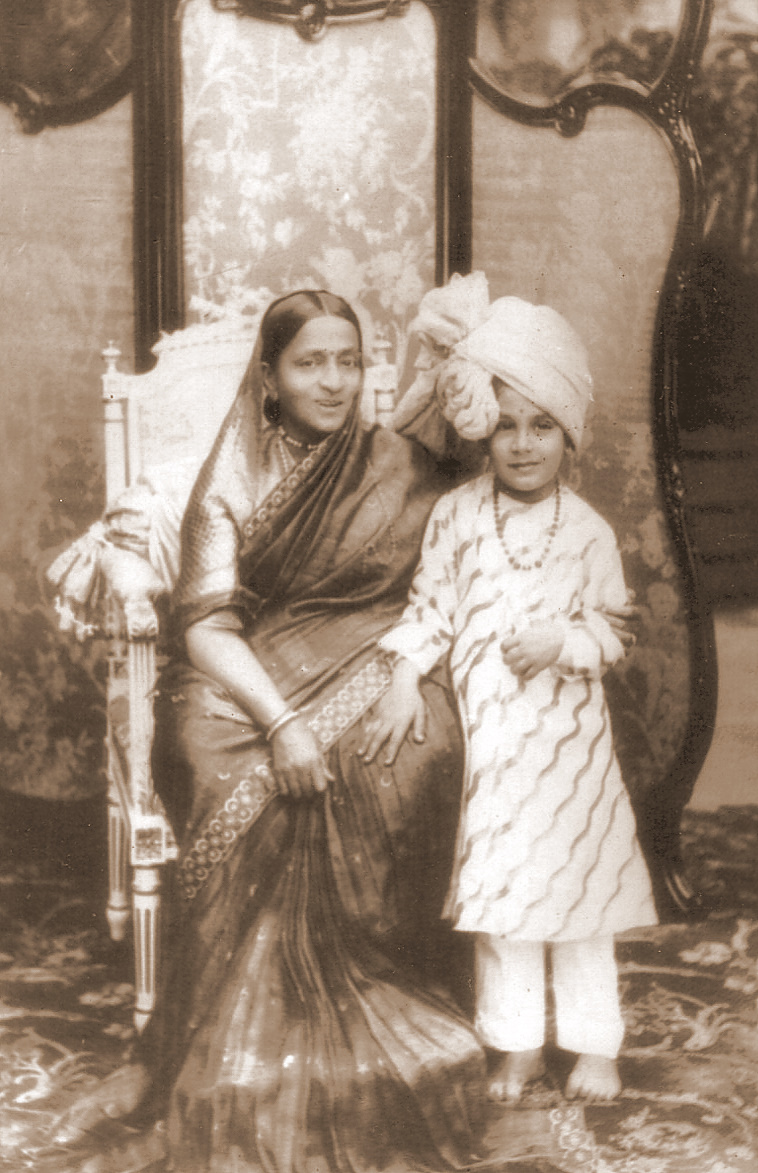
- Maharani Vani Vilasa with her grandson Jayachamarajendra Wadiyar
- Born: 4 July 1866; Kalale, Kingdom of Mysore
- Died: 7 July 1934 (aged 68); Bangalore, Kingdom of Mysore
- Spouse: Chamarajendra Wadiyar X
- Issue: Krishnaraja Wadiyar IV; Kanteerava Narasimharaja Wadiyar; Jayalakshmammanni; Krishnajammanni; Cheluvajammanni
- House: Wadiyar dynasty
- Father: Narasarajae Urs
- Mother: Gunamba Kempananjammanni
- Religion: Hinduism

Kempananjammanni Devi (4 July 1866 – 7 July 1934) was the Maharani of Mysore and later queen mother and regent of the Kingdom of Mysore.

She was the wife of Maharaja Chamarajendra Wadiyar X and the mother of Maharaja Krishnaraja Wadiyar IV. She was queen regent between 1895 and 1902, during the minority of Krishnaraja Wadiyar IV. She occupies as significant place in the annals of Mysore's history. Her contributions to the citizenry and her roles as maharani, regent, and queen mother to the young prince Yuvaraja Krishnaraja Wadiyar IV, have been commended.

== Life ==
Kempananjammanni was born in the village of Kalale near Mysore in 1866. She was married to the Maharaja Chamarajendra Wadiyar X on 26 May 1878 and assumed the suffix Vani Vilasa Sannidhana as was the practice in Mysore Royal family . In 1881, the Rendition of Mysore Act 1881 was passed carried, restoring the government of the kingdom from British India back to the natural prince, who was now 18. The kingdom had been restored nearly after 50 years to the Wadiyars since the fall of Tipu in 1799 and the Commissioner's Rule in 1831 by British India. In 1884, Krishnaraja Wadiyar IV was born to the royal couple. In quick succession, they also had another son, Kanteerava Narasimharaja Wadiyar, and three daughters. two more sons raja wadiyar and Devaraja Wadiyar died in their infancy.

=== Vani Vilas Regency ===
Maharaja Chamarajendra Wadiyar, while on a visit to Calcutta in 1894, developed diphtheria and succumbed to sudden death there, thus abruptly cutting short a promising reign that lasted only 13 years. He was just 32 and had already left his mark as an excellent leader. His death suddenly created a government crisis in the kingdom as Prince Krishnarajendra Wadiyar IV was still in minority. The unexpected tragedy was regarded as a great national misfortune throughout India and was deplored by the British Government as an imperial loss. The royal family plunged into great sorrow and the citizens were said to have felt orphaned.

The burden of governing the kingdom fell on Maharani Kempananjammanni, a severe bubonic plague struck the capital Mysore city, reducing the population in half, under this issue, she was made as queen-regent, a post she held for about eight years.

She was advised by Sir K. Seshadri Iyer at that time. Sir T. R. A. Thumboo Chetty, a former Chief Justice of Mysore and a senior member of the Regency Privy Council, was also an acting dewan for Iyer. She was also assisted by her brother Sir M. Kantaraj Urs, later dewan, as her private secretary. She helped Mysore recover from slump. Progress in all fields resulted from their efficient administration and blessed the entire citizenry. Generation of electricity from the river Kaveri, promoting the Indian Institute of Science, construction of the Vani Vilas Sagara dam (also known as the Māri-Kanave Valley aqueduct), construction of the new palace, extension of new localities in Mysore, water supply through pipes (Vani Vilas Waterworks), and laying of foundation stone of Victoria Hospital in Bangalore were enough testimony. The British Crown decorated her with a CI for her distinguished leadership.

…there are three jewels in Mysore's history, who have struggled for the country's good. Maharani Lakshamanni, Maharani Sitavilasa Sannidhana, and Maharani Vani Vilasa Sannidhana [Kempa Nanjammani]. She was not only a mother to Krishnara Wadiyar, but also to all the citizens. For the contributions they have made, their names deserve to be written in golden letters…

— Prof. Rao Bahadur R Narasimhachar

Maharani Kempananjamanni was a great believer in women's education; under her patronage, Maharani's College got all due attention. She was a staunch follower of Hinduism, but respected all faiths equally.

=== Retirement and last days ===
She retired when Krishnaraja Wadiyar IV came of age when, on 8 August 1902; the yuvaraja ascended the throne that marked the end of memorable regency and the beginning of what was to become Mysore's golden era, an era that came to be known by the encomium Ramarajya.

After a brief illness, she died on the midnight of 7 July 1934, in Bangalore.

== Legacy ==
There are many edifices in the city of Mysore with the prefix 'Vani Vilasa': Waterworks (Vani Vilasa Sagara dam), Maternity Hospital, Girls High School and College, Bridge, Ladies Club, and Road, which, to this day, commemorate her memory.
