= Kalale =

- village
- Location in Karnataka, India Kalale (India)
- Coordinates: 12°05′0″N 76°40′0″E
- Country: India
- State: Karnataka
- District: Mysore
- Talukas: Nanjangud

Government
  - Body: Gram panchayat

Population (2001)
  - Total: 7,278

Languages
  - Official: Kannada
- Time zone: UTC+5:30 (IST)
- ISO 3166 code: IN-KA
- Vehicle registration: KA
- Website: karnataka.gov.in

Kalale is a village in the southern state of Karnataka, India. It is located in the Nanjangud taluk of Mysore district.

== Demographics ==
As of 2001 India census, Kalale had a population of 7278, with 3636 males and 3642 females.

== Historical importance ==
Kalale Dalavais occupied prominent position in both Vijayanagar Empire and the kings of Yadhuvamsha of Mysore. There are documentary evidences to show that Kalale enjoyed some prominence due to its proximity to kings until about 1831. Mysore kings appear to have devoted much attention for improvement of Lakshmikanthaswamy temple. The Mysore king's insignias like Shanka (Conch), Chakra (wheel) and Mathsya (fish) are available in the temple.

The present Lakshmikanthaswamy temple appears to have been built in 3 stages in 1300AD, 1350AD and 1500AD and built in Dravidian style over a wide plot of 100 × 200 ft. The five-storied main Gopuram of the temple is of 50 ft height with 5 Kalashas. This temple is considered as an ancient protected monument by Archaeological Department of Government of Karnataka.

== See also ==
- Mysore
- Districts of Karnataka
