= Krishna Rajendra Hospital =

Coordinates: 12.31397°N 76.65070°E

Krishnarajendra Hospital
- Government of Karnataka
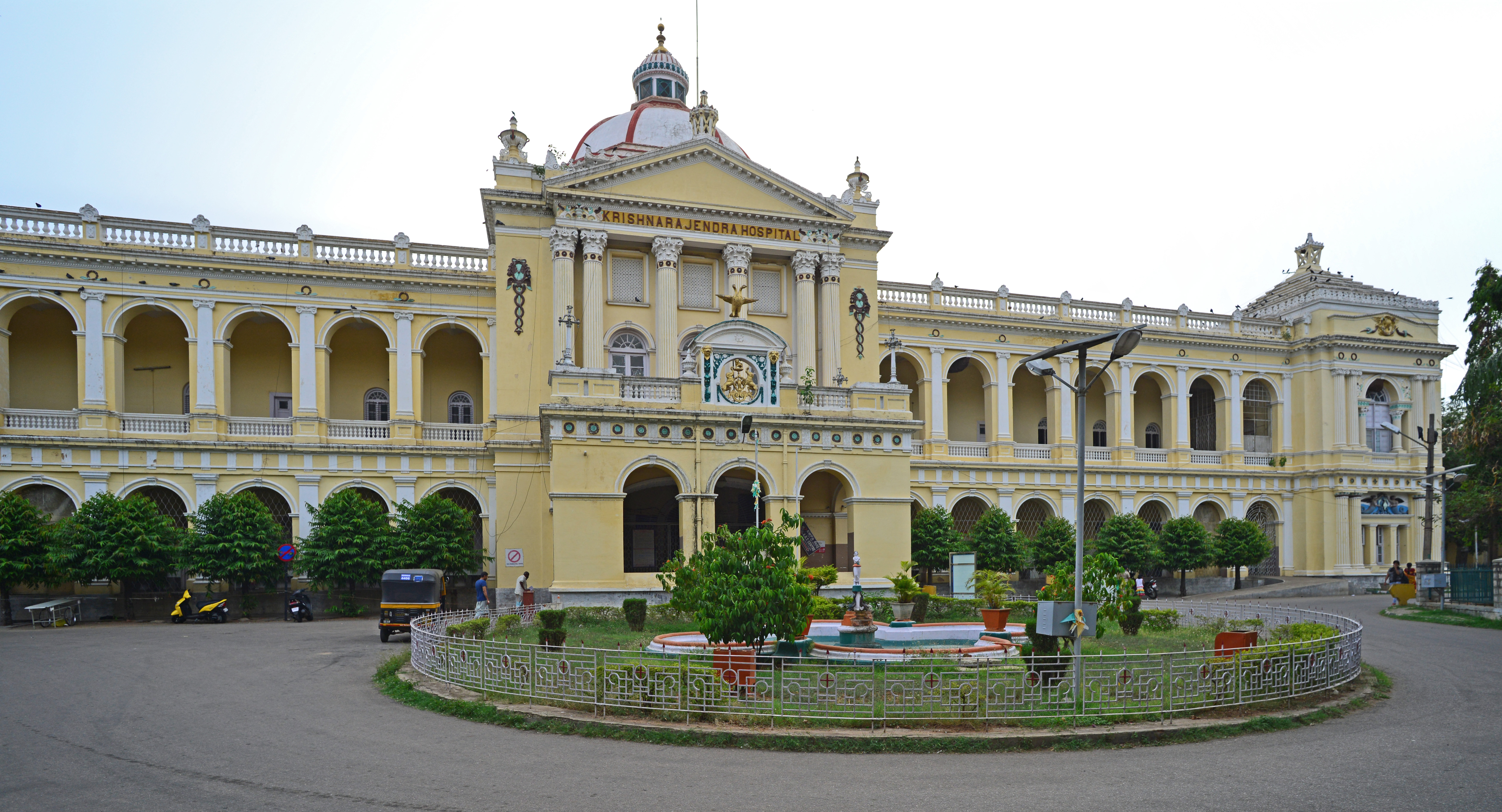

Geography
- Location: Sayajirao Road, Mysore, Karnataka, India

Organisation
- Type: Teaching, District General
- Affiliated university: Mysore Medical College & Research Institute

Services
- Standards: National Accreditation Board for Testing and Calibration Laboratories
- Emergency department: Yes

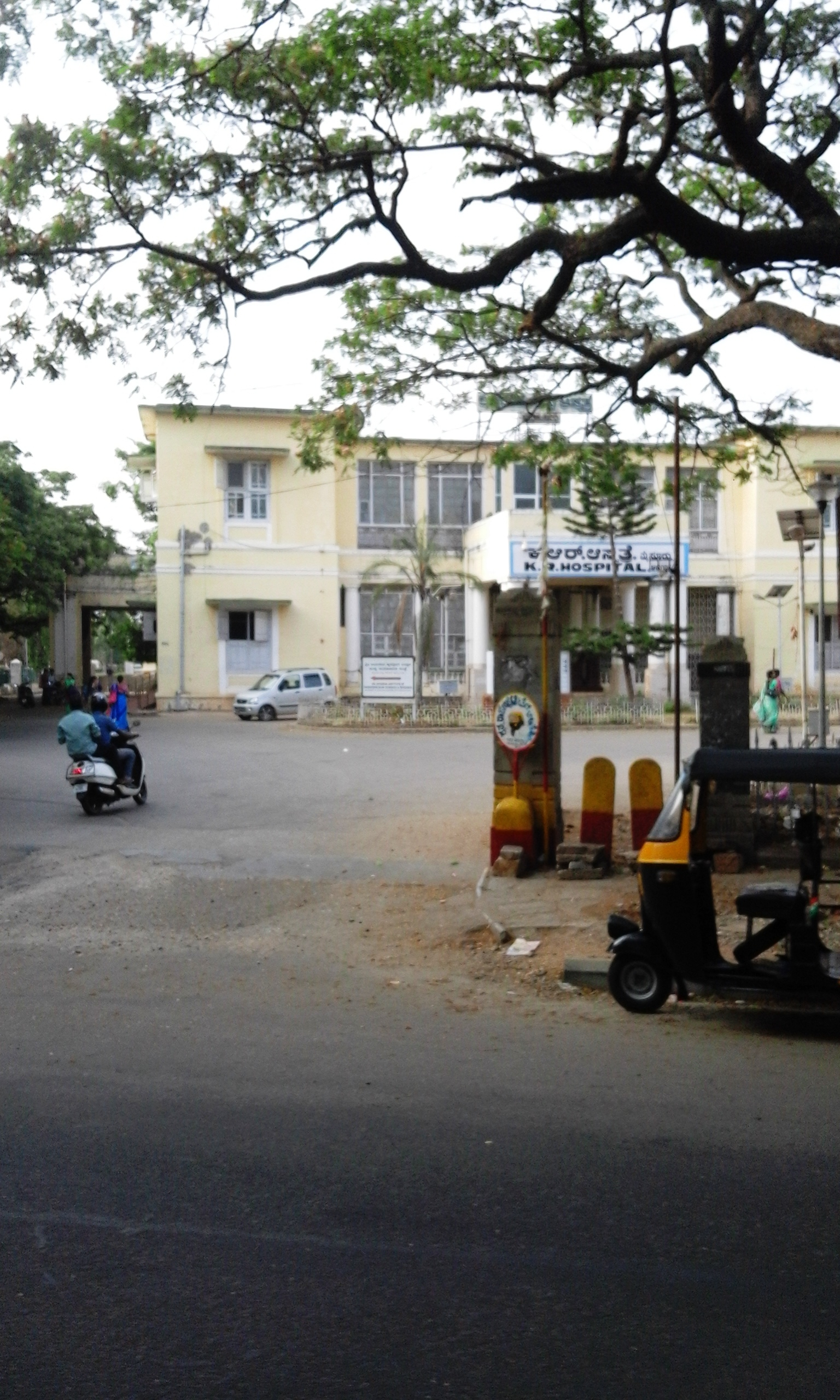
K.R.Hospital, Mysore

Krishna Rajendra Hospital (KR Hospital) and Cheluvamba Hospitals are both tertiary referral centers and teaching hospitals attached to the Mysore Medical College in Mysore, Karnataka, India. The KR Hospital was started in 1927.

K R Hospital has a total bed capacity of around 1330 beds which includes 335 beds in general medicine, 313 in general surgery and about 500 in other specialties like ENT, ophthalmology, urology, plastic surgery, psychiatry and others. People from different taluks, villages and other places in and around Mysore visit the hospital for affordable caring and treatment for various ailments and diseases.

A multi-storied OPD building houses a state of the art ICCU on the ground floor and medical wards on other floors in addition to various consultation rooms.

The surgical wards are located in a separate building which is popularly known as the "stone building".

The hospital has a 24-hour casualty, radiology, microbiology, pathology and biochemistry laboratories, blood bank and pharmacy catering to its needs.

A number of subspecialties have been introduced including plastic surgery, urology, nephrology, cardiology, laser surgery, burns ward and dialysis services.

In October 2022, Rs. 89 crore was sanctioned. The repairs scheduled to be carried out in February 2023, for the buildings of KR Hospital, Chuluvamba Hospital and other facilities under the Mysore Medical College and Research Institute (MMC&RI) were put off due to procedures needed to take up repairs for a heritage building. Later, they were completed and the hospitals under MMC&RI got further hi-tech upgrades in March 2026.

== See also ==
- List of Heritage Buildings in Mysore
