= Krishna Raja Wadiyar IV =

Maharaja of Mysore from 1902 to 1940

Krishnaraja Wadiyar IV
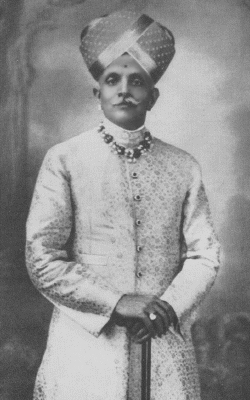
- Photograph of Krishnaraja Wadiyar IV

24th Maharaja of Mysore
- Reign: 8 February 1902 – 3 August 1940
- Coronation: 1 February 1895, Mysore Palace
- Predecessor: Chamarajendra Wadiyar X
- Successor: Jayachamarajendra Wadiyar
- Born: 4 June 1884; Mysore Palace, Mysore (present-day Karnataka, India)
- Died: 3 August 1940 (aged 56); Bangalore Palace, Bangalore, Kingdom of Mysore (present-day Karnataka, India)
- Spouse: Pratapa Kumaribai Devi
Names
- Rajarshi Nalwadi Krishnaraja Wadiyar Bahadur
- House: Wadiyar dynasty
- Father: Chamarajendra Wadiyar X
- Mother: Kempananjammani Devi
- Religion: Hinduism

Krishnaraja Wadiyar IV (4 June 1884 – 3 August 1940) was the twenty-fourth Maharaja of Mysore, reigning from 1902 until his death in 1940.

Krishnaraja Wadiyar IV is popularly deemed a rajarshi, or 'saintly king', a moniker with which Mahatma Gandhi revered the king in 1925 for his administrative reforms and achievements. He was a philosopher king, seen by Paul Brunton as living the ideal expressed in Plato's Republic. Herbert Samuel compared him to Emperor Ashoka. Acknowledging the maharaja's noble and efficient kingship, John Sankey declared in 1930 at the first Round Table Conference in London, "Mysore is the best administered state in the world". He is often regarded as the "father of modern Mysore" and his reign the "golden age of Mysore". Madan Mohan Malaviya described the maharaja as "dharmic" (virtuous in conduct). John Gunther, the American author, heaped praise on the king. In an obituary, The Times called him "a ruling prince second to none in esteem and affection inspired by both his impressive administration and his attractive personality".

At the time of his death, Krishnaraja Wadiyar IV was one of the world's wealthiest men, with a personal fortune estimated in 1940 to be worth US$400 million, equivalent to $7 billion in 2018 prices.

== Early years ==
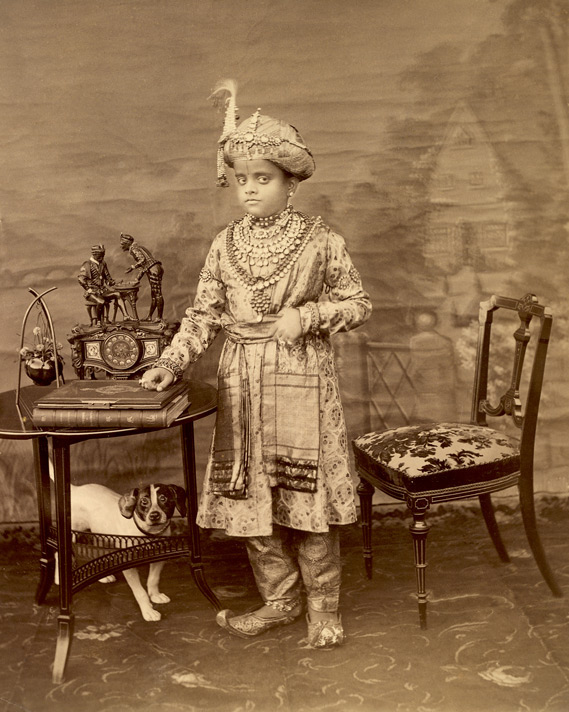
Krishnaraja Wadiyar IV aged 11, c. 1895

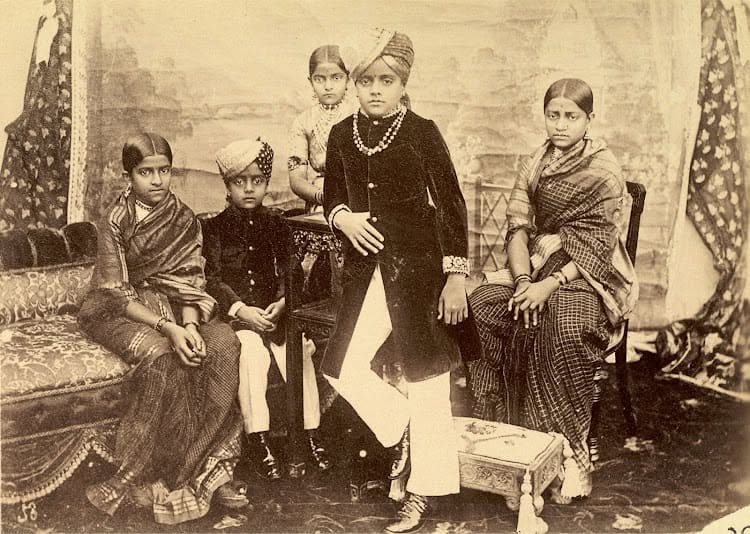
Krishnaraja Wadiyar IV (standing, centre) with his brother and sisters, 1895. Left to right: Krishnajammanni, Kanteerava Narasimharaja Wadiyar, Chaluvajammanni, Krishnaraja Wadiyar IV, Jayalakshmammanni.

Krishnaraja Wadiyar IV was born on 4 June 1884 in Mysore Palace as the son of Maharaja Chamarajendra Wadiyar X and Maharani Kempananjammanni Devi. After the sudden death of his father in Calcutta in 1894, the widowed queen mother Kempananjammanni Devi ruled the state as regent from 1895 to 1902, until Krishnaraja Wadiyar reached the age of maturity on 8 August 1902. Upon accession to the throne, he became the fourth king of Mysore by the name, hence known in the vernacular language Kannada as Nalwadi Krishnaraja Wadiyar (the qualifying prefix nālvaḍi means "the fourth").

The maharaja had his early education and training at Lokaranjan Palace in Mysore under the direction of P. Raghavendra Rao. In addition to Western studies, he was instructed in Kannada and Sanskrit. He was taught horse-riding and Indian and Western classical music. His early administrative training was imparted by Sir Stuart Fraser of the Bombay Civil Service. The study of the principles of jurisprudence and methods of revenue administration was supplemented by extensive tours of the state during which he gained immense knowledge of the nature of the country which he was later to govern.

== Reign ==
=== Accession ===
Shortly after the death of his father Maharaja Chamarajendra Wadiyar X on 28 December 1894, Krishnaraja Wodeyar IV, still a boy of eleven, ascended the throne on 1 February 1895. His mother Maharani Kemparajammanni Devi ruled as queen regent until Krishnaraja Wodeyar IV took over on 8 February 1902. The yuvaraja was invested as the Maharaja of Mysore, with full ruling powers, by George Curzon, the Governor-General of India, on 8 August 1902 at a ceremony at Jaganmohana Palace.

=== Government ===
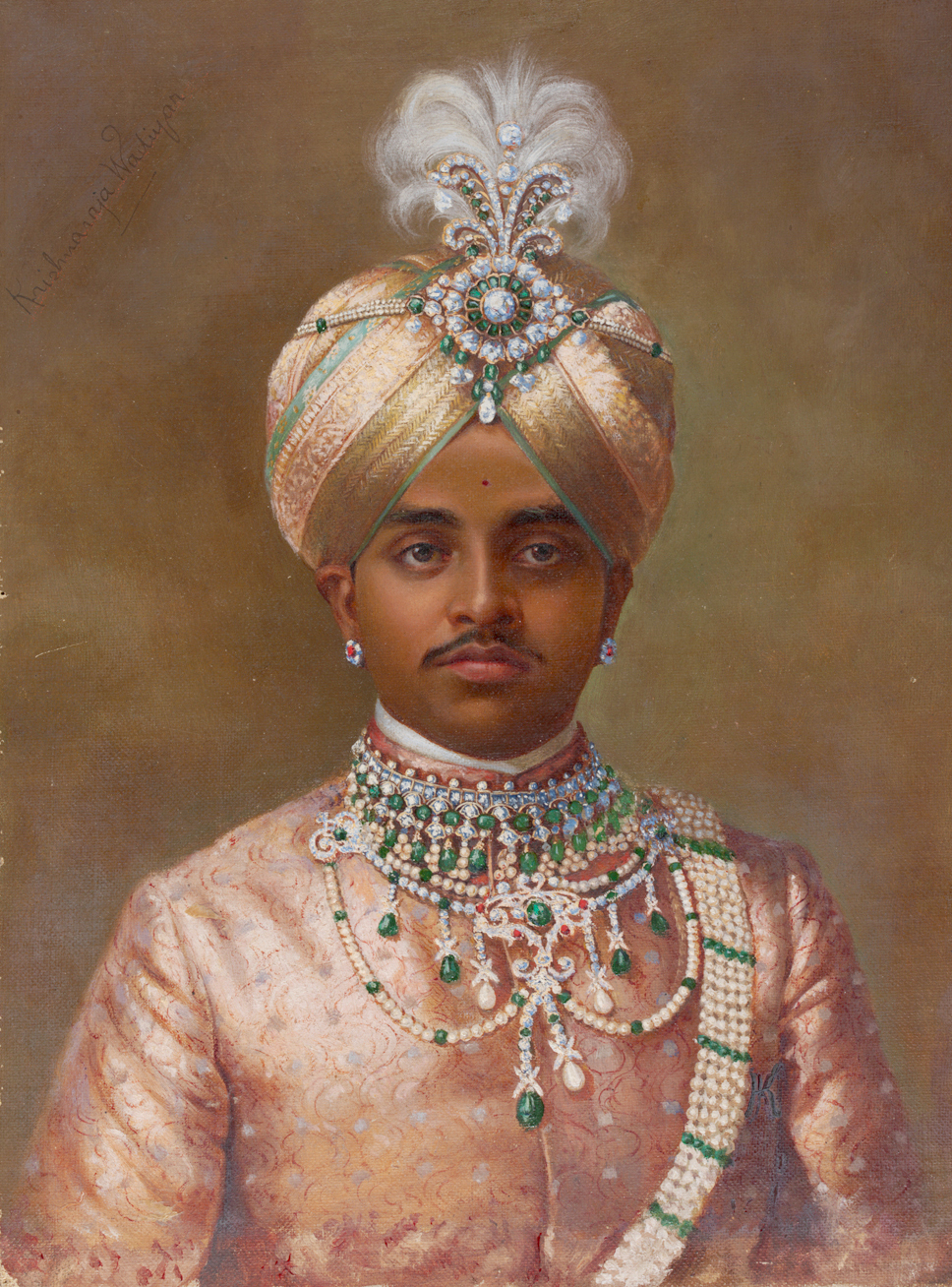
Portrait of Krishnaraja Wodeyar IV by K. Keshavayya, 1906

Mysore became the first Indian state to have a representative assembly, Mysore Representative Assembly, a democratic forum in 1881. During the maharaja's reign, the assembly was enlarged and became bicameral in 1907 with the creation of the Mysore Legislative Council, a house of elders which introduced much new legislation for the state.

During the maharaja's reign, the Kingdom of Mysore witnessed development in a range of fields. Mysore became the first Indian state to generate hydroelectric power in Asia, and Bangalore was the first Asian city to have street lights, first lit on 5 August 1905. Princes from other sections of India were sent to Mysore for administrative training.

=== Reforms ===
The maharaja worked towards alleviating poverty and improving rural reconstruction, public health, industry and economic regeneration, education and the fine arts. He abolished child marriage (for girls below the age 8), gave special importance for girls' education, and offered scholarship for widowed women.

At a time when support for domestic products was pivotal for India's self-reliance and eventual independence from British India, the maharaja encouraged spinning at scale, for which Gandhi greatly praised him.

=== Education and arts ===
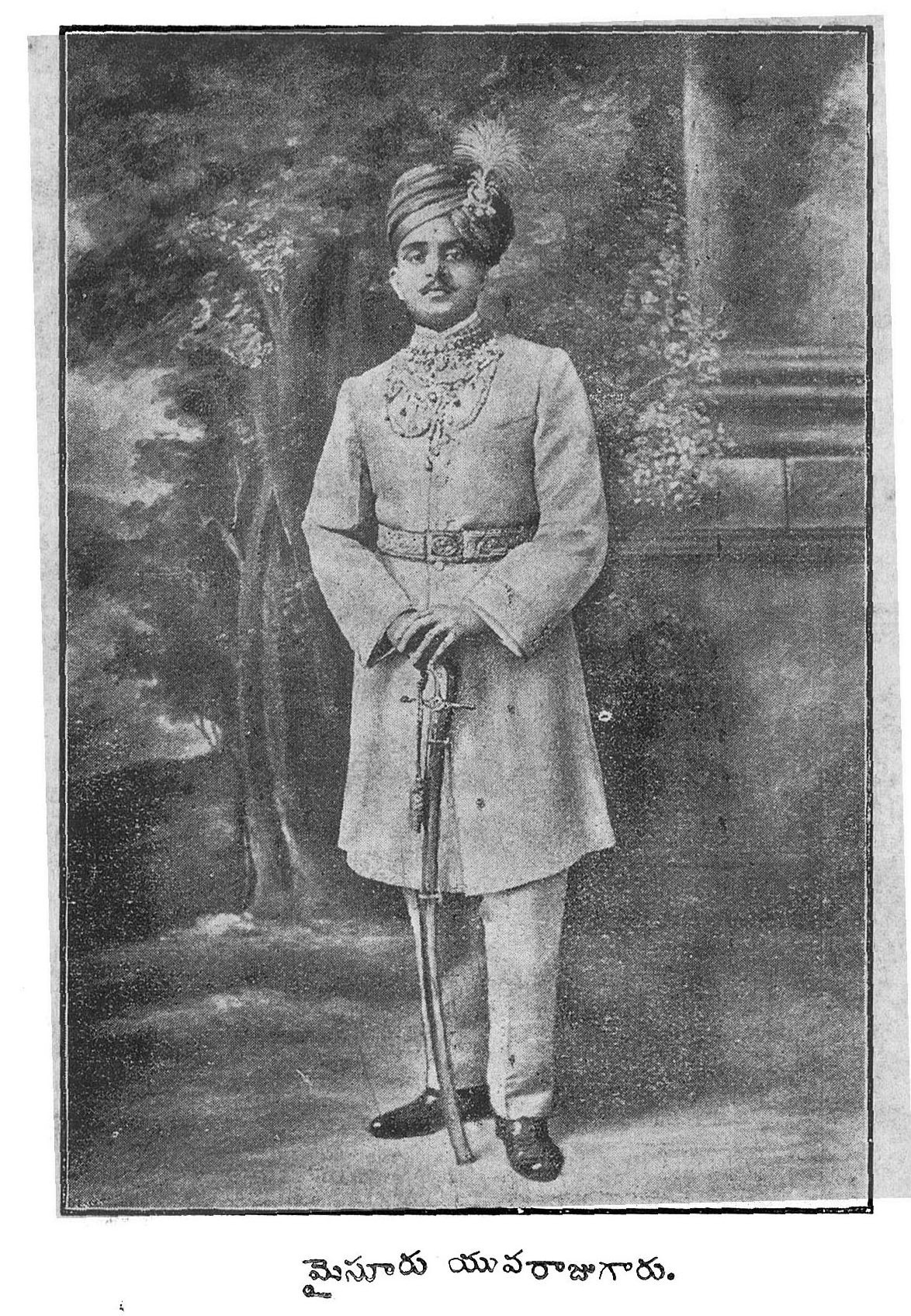
Krishnaraja Wodeyar IV in 1911

Krishnaraja Wodeyar IV set up numerous educational infrastructures and institutions. Krishnaraja Wadiyar was the first chancellor of Banaras Hindu University (whose co-founder he also was) and the University of Mysore (whose founder he was). The latter was the first university chartered by an Indian province. The Indian Institute of Science at Bangalore, which was initiated during his mother's tenure as regent, functionally started during his reign in 1911 with a gift of 371 acres (1.5 km^{2}) of land and a donation of funds.

The maharaja was a patron of Indian music, both Carnatic and Hindustani, and Western classical music. He was an accomplished musician and, like his predecessors, patronised fine arts. The maharaja was a connoisseur of Carnatic and Hindustani music himself. He played eight musical instruments: flute, violin, saxophone, piano, mridangam, nadaswara, sitar, and veena. Members of the Agra Gharana, including Nattan Khan and Ustad Vilayat Hussain Khan, were guests of the maharajah at Mysore, as were Abdul Karim Khan and Gauhar Jan. Barkatullah Khan was a palace musician from 1919 until his death in 1940.

Asthana Vidwan Kadagathur Seshacharya has written various works and is famous for his contributions towards Sanskrit and Kannada literature. The maharaja also composed many poems in Kannada himself.

== Contributions ==
A list of major developments during the reign and under the patronage of Maharaja Krishnaraja Wadiyar IV
Year	Notes
1902	Hydroelectric project at Shivanasamudra Falls is founded
1903	Minto Eye Hospital built at Bangalore; one among the world's oldest specialised ophthalmology hospitals
1905	Bangalore becomes the first city in Asia to get electric street lights
1907	Vani Vilasa Sagara at Chitradurga completed; the first dam in Karnataka
1907	Mysore Legislative Council is established with a view to associate certain number of non-official persons having practical experience and knowledge to assist the Government in making laws and regulations
1909	Indian Institute of Science is established at Bangalore
1909	Mysore Boy Scouts is established; the first of its kind in India
1913	State Bank of Mysore is established
1913	Mysore Agricultural Residential School is established at Bangalore; it was initially established in 1899 by Maharani Kempananjammanni Devi with an initial grant of 30 acres as an experimental agricultural station
1915	Kannada Sahitya Parishat at Bangalore established
1915	Formation of Mysore Social Progress Association to empower weaker sections of society
1916	University of Mysore is established
1916	Bangalore Printing and Publishing Company is established
1916	Yuvaraja's College at Mysore is established
1916	Mysore Chamber of Commerce is established
1916	Government Sandalwood Oil Factory is established at Bangalore
1917	School of Engineering is established at Bangalore
1917	Maharani's Science College for Women is established at Mysore
1918	First leg of Mysore State Railways (MSR) finished; opened 232 miles of railway to traffic. By 1938 MSR had 740 miles of railway track
1918	Wood Distillation Factory is found at Bhadravathi
1918	Mysore Chrome and Tanning Factory is established
1918	Sir Lesley Miller is appointed to analyse problems of backward classes (the Miller Report later recommend a reservation of 25% of jobs in the government to non-Brahmans)
1921	Lalitha Mahal Palace finished
1921	Government Science College at Bangalore found
1923	Mysore Iron Works founded at Bhadravathi
1923	Women enfranchisement; first Indian state to do so
1924	Krishna Raja Sagar (KRS) dam is finished
1924	Mysore Medical College is established
1925	More than 100 acres of land is donated for the establishment of National Institute of Mental Health and Neurosciences (NIMHANS)
1925	Kadhara Sahakara Sangha is established at Tagdhur, helping villagers earn a living
1927	Krishna Rajendra Hospital at Mysore is established (now part of Mysore Medical College)
1928	K.R. Market at Bangalore is established; the main wholesale market dealing with commodities
1930	Marakonahalli dam in Tumkur district is completed (the dam has an automatic siphon system, first of its kind in Asia)
1930	Krishnarajanagara township was finished (after a flood by the Kaveri damaged the nearby town of Yedatore)
1933	St. Philomena's Cathedral at Mysore is inaugurated
1933	Bangalore Town Hall is built
1933	Mysore Sugar Mills is established at Mandya
1933	KR Mills at Mysore is established
1934	Vanivilas Women and Children Hospital established at Bangalore
1934	10 acres of land at Bangalore gifted to Sir C. V. Raman for what is now Raman Research Institute (RRI)
1936	Mysore Paper Mills established at Bhadravati
1936	Mysore Lamps at Bangalore established
1937	Mysore Chemical and Fertilisers Factory at Belagola established
1937	Mysore Paints and Varnish Limited is established
1938	Maharani's College for Women is established at Bangalore
1939	Mandya district formed
1939	Hassan district formed
1939	Glass and Porcelain Factory is established at Bangalore (electrical insulators for high voltage lines were manufactured). The factory later became part of BHEL
1939	Hirebhaskara dam (now Mahatma Gandhi Hydroelectric Project) across the Sharavathi began functioning to ensure steady water supply for the 120 MW Krishnarajendra Hydroelectric Power Station

== Personal life ==
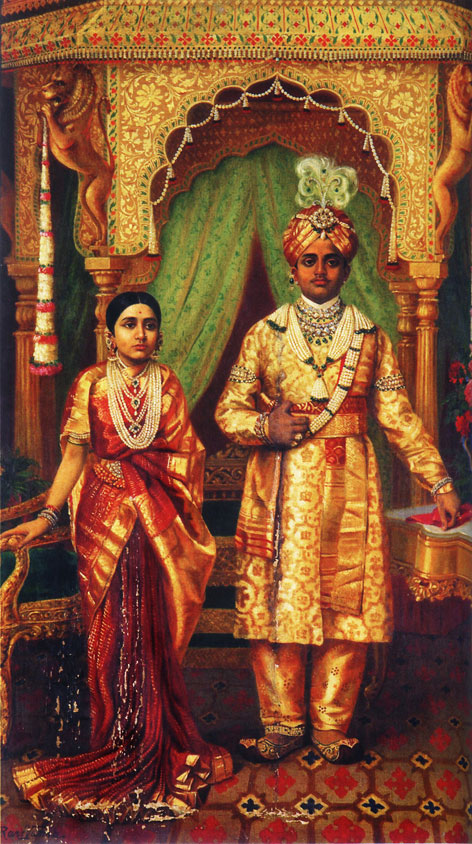
Marriage of Maharaja Krishnaraja Wadiyar IV and Yuvarani Pratapa Kumaribai (painting by Raja Ravi Varma, 1904)

Krishnaraja Wadiyar IV was wedded on 6 June 1900 at Jaganmohan Palace to Maharani Pratapa Kumari Devi of Kathiawar, the youngest daughter of Rana Bane Singh of Vana, Kathiawar (present-day Gujarat State). The wedding — the first marriage alliance between the Mysore royal family and a Rajput house of northern India — was held in a large hall specially built for the occasion in the garden fronting the Jaganmohan Palace, then the family's residence while the new Mysore Palace was still under construction following the 1897 fire. A formal photograph of the Navagali (Fifth Day) ceremony, held during the wedding festivities, shows the young couple seated beneath a canopy in the durbar hall with the British Resident, Col. Robertson, Dewan K. Seshadri Iyer, and senior Mysore nobility in attendance; the photograph is preserved in the British Library's Curzon Collection, part of the "Souvenir of Mysore Album" presented to Viceroy Lord Curzon. Following the ceremonies, the couple were taken through the city in a grand procession on 14 June, contemporary accounts comparing its scale to the annual Dasara procession. The couple had no children. He died of heart attack on 3 August 1940. His nephew Jayachamaraja Wadiyar — son of his brother Kanteerava Narasimharaja Wadiyar — succeeded him as Maharaja.

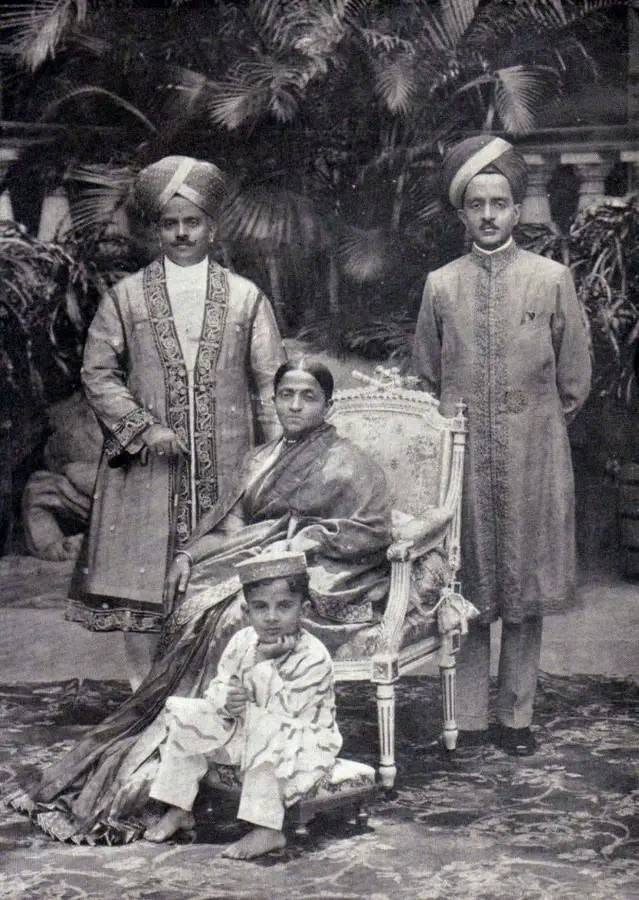
Krishnaraja Wadiyar IV's mother, the former Regent Maharani Kempananjammanni Devi (centre), with her sons Krishnaraja Wadiyar IV (left) and Kanteerava Narasimharaja Wadiyar (right), and her grandson Jayachamarajendra Wadiyar (seated), who would succeed his uncle as Maharaja in 1940. Circa 1925.

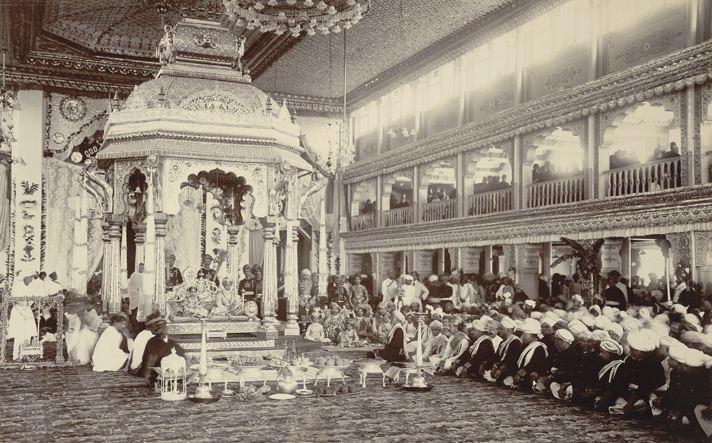
Krishnaraja Wadiyar IV and Maharani Pratapa Kumari Ammani during the Navagali (Fifth Day) ceremony of their wedding, June 1900. Curzon Collection, British Library.

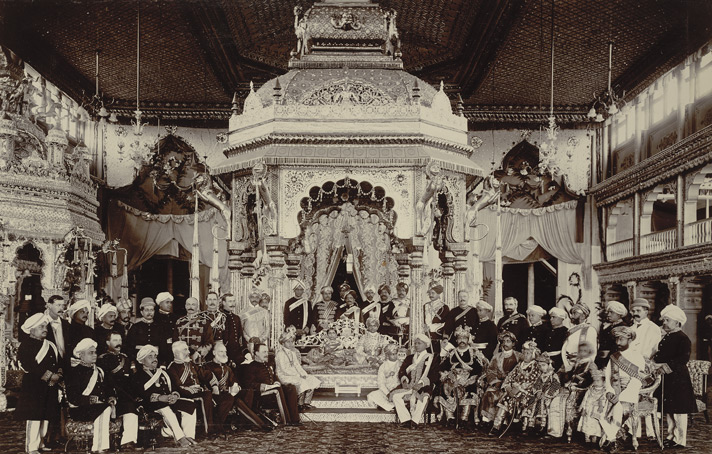
The European Durbar held during the royal wedding, 1900. Curzon Collection, British Library.

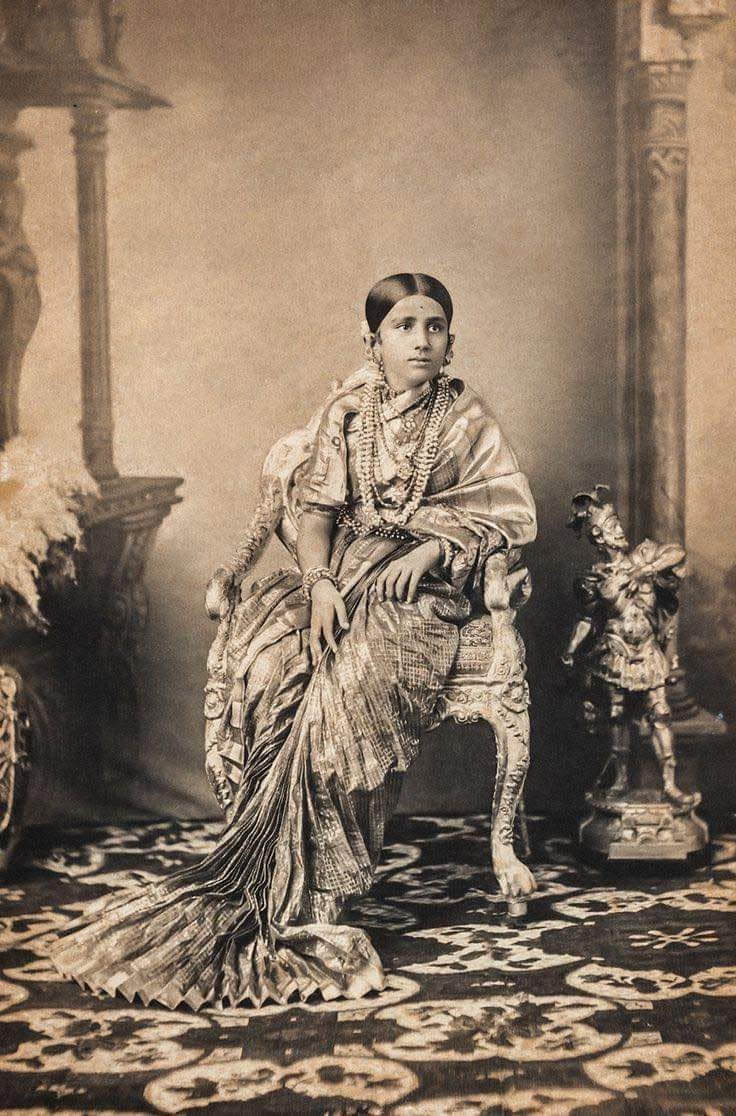
Maharani Pratapa Kumari Ammani, photographed by Barton, Son & Co., Bangalore, 1900.

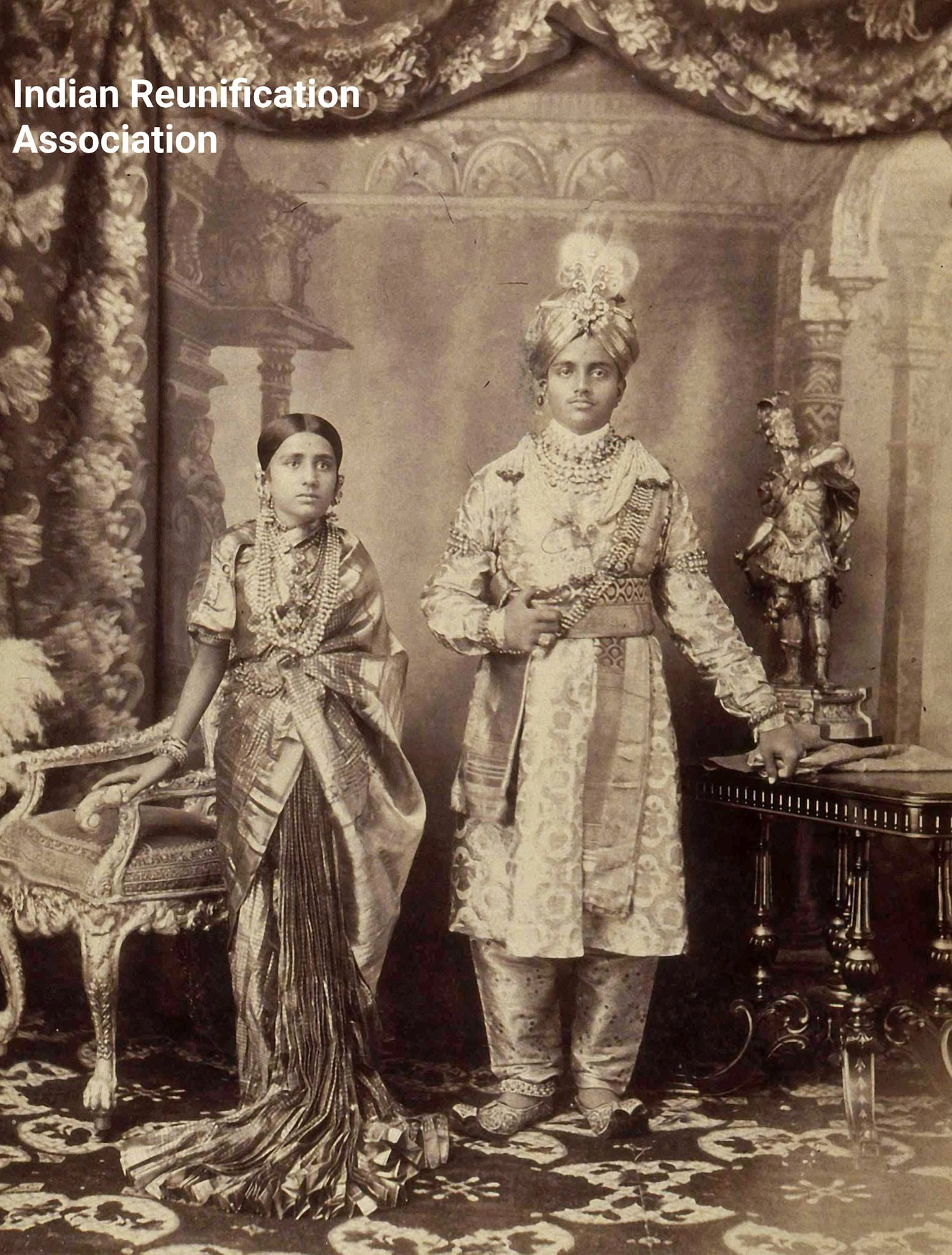
Krishnaraja Wadiyar IV and Maharani Pratapa Kumari Ammani, in a photograph from a family collection believed to date from around the time of their wedding. (Note: This photograph closely resembles the solo studio portrait of Pratapa Kumari Ammani shown above — the two appear to share the same jewelry, saree, and a decorative statuette prop, suggesting they may derive from the same photographic sitting. However, unlike the two Curzon Collection images above, which carry a documented British Library provenance, this specific photograph's original source and photographer have not been independently traced beyond a family-held copy.)

== Honours ==
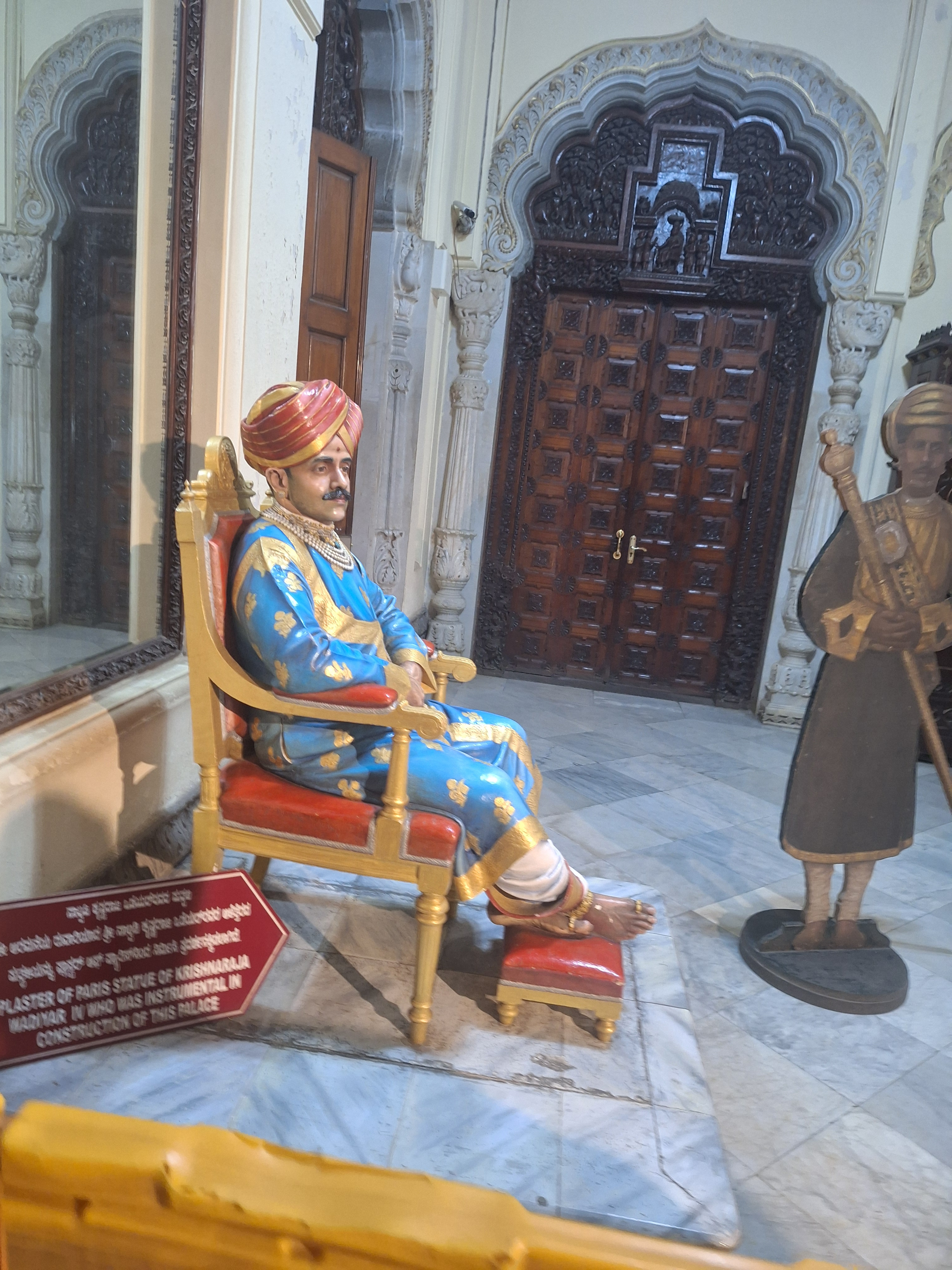
Statue of Krishna Raja Wadiyar IV in Mysore Palace made by Plaster of Paris

- King George VI Coronation Medal, 1937
- King George V Silver Jubilee Medal, 1935
- Knight Grand Cross of the Order of the British Empire (GBE), 1917
- Bailiff Grand Cross of the Order of St John (GCStJ), 1911
- Delhi Durbar Gold Medal, 1911
- Knight Grand Commander of the Most Exalted Order of the Star of India (GCSI), 1907
- Delhi Durbar Gold Medal, 1903

=== Honorary doctorates ===
- Honorary Doctorate, University of Mysore, (posthumously in 2011)
- Honorary Doctorate, Banaras Hindu University (at its 21st convocation held on 28 December 1937)

=== Memorials ===
- K.R.S. Dam, Mysore; K.R. Circle, Mysore; K.R. Nagara, Mysore
- K.R. Market, Bangalore; K.R. Pura, Bengaluru
- K.R. Pete, Mandya

== Notes ==
Krishna Raja Wadiyar IV Wodeyar dynasty Born: 4 June 1884 Died: 3 August 1940
Regnal titles
Preceded by Chamaraja Wodeyar	Maharaja of Mysore; 1894–1940	Succeeded by Jayachamaraja Wodeyar Bahadur
