= Mirza Ismail =

Indian politician (1883–1959)

The Right Honourable Sir Mirza Muhammad Ismail KCIE OBE CStJ PC
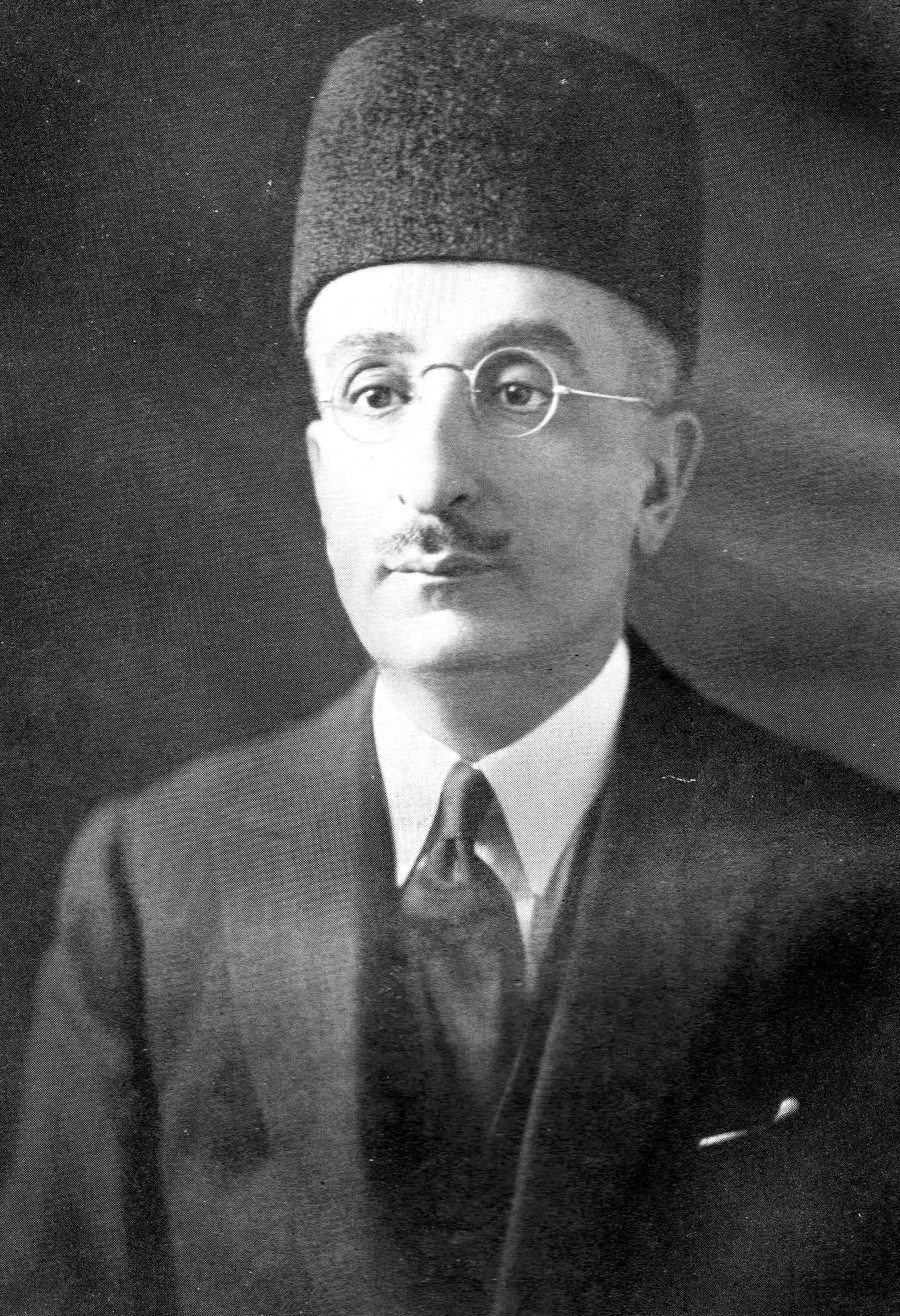
- The Prime Minister of Mysore, Jaipur, and Hyderabad

Diwan of Hyderabad
- In office 1946–1947
- Monarch: Osman Ali Khan, Asaf Jah VII
- Preceded by: Muhammad Ahmad Said Khan Chhatari
- Succeeded by: Muhammad Ahmad Said Khan Chhatari

Diwan of Jaipur
- In office 1942–1946
- Monarch: Man Singh II

22nd Diwan of the Mysore Kingdom
- In office 1 May 1926 – 1941
- Monarchs: Krishna Raja Wadiyar IV, Jayachamarajendra Wadiyar
- Preceded by: Sir Albion Rajkumar Banerjee
- Succeeded by: Sir N. Madhava Rao

Personal details
- Born: 24 October 1883 Bangalore, Kingdom of Mysore, British India
- Died: 5 January 1959 (aged 75) Bangalore, Mysore State (present day Karnataka), India
- Spouse: Zeebundeh Begum Shirazi
- Children: Mirza Humayun; Mirza Shah Taj Begum; Mirza Gauhar Taj Begum
- Relatives: Agha Aly Asker (grandfather); Shakereh Khaleeli (granddaughter); Tyabji family (sister in law)
- Occupation: Diwan of Mysore (1926–1941); Prime Minister, Jaipur (Diwan of Jaipur) (1942–1946); Diwan of Hyderabad (1946–1947)

Sir Mirza Muhammad Ismail Amin-ul-Mulq KCIE OBE CStJ PC (24 October 1883 – 5 January 1959) was an Indian statesman and police officer who served as the Diwan of Mysore, Jaipur, and Hyderabad.

Indian lawyer and politician Sir C. P. Ramaswami Iyer considered him "one of the cleverest men in India". His longtime friend Sir C. V. Raman remarked, "His accessibility and personal charm coupled with his depth of knowledge and his keen sense of human and cultural values made him a great and highly successful administrator".

== Early years ==
Mirza Ismail was born on 24 October 1883 in Bangalore to Aga Jan Mohammed Khazim Shirazie, the longest serving assistant district commissioner (ADC) in the Kingdom of Mysore and was of Persian descent.

His family had longstanding relations with Mysore Palace. His grandfather Agha Aly Asker Shirazie supplied horses to the royal stables and trained the royal cavalry.

Ismail himself was close friends with Yuvaraja Krishnaraja Wadiyar IV, later Maharaja Krishnaraja Wadiyar IV. He and the young prince were inseparable from an early age. Both fine equestrians were studious, with big dreams for the kingdom–even before they would become classmates at the royal private palace school under Sir Stuart Fraser.

Ismail graduated from St Patrick's College, Bangalore in 1904. Soon after, he became Assistant Superintendent of Police, Mysore.

== Premierships ==
Ismail became the private secretary to Maharaja Krishnaraja Wadiyar IV; the maharaja (king) had great faith in his administrative acumen and abilities to implement them. It was at this time that the maharaja urged his prime minister Sir M. Visvesvaraya to mentor Ismail.

=== Diwan of Mysore ===
In 1926, at the recommendation of Sir M. Visvesvaraya, Maharaja Krishnaraja Wadiyar appointed him Diwan of Mysore.

==== Projects and initiatives ====
Bangalore Town Hall, commissioned by Yuvaraja Kanteerava Narasimharaja Wadiyar, was designed by Ismail. The first rural electrification programme in India were also implemented by him.

He was a superlative administrator and set an inspiring example to the officials by undertaking extensive tours and personally heeding to the grievances of the people. Over his fourteen years of service, the Kingdom of Mysore made substantial progress in the field of industries, both in the private and public sectors. The sugar factory at Shimoga and the Khadi Production Centre at Badanval were the other industries that were set up during his time. A trade commissioner was also appointed in London. Industries started during his period as Diwan include the Porcelain Factory and the Glass Factory in Bangalore; also established were paper, cement, steel, fertilisers, sugar and electric bulbs factories. Founded under his premiership were Vysya Bank, cement factory, the chemical and fertilisers factory, and sugar mills.

In general, he did not exhibit major religious biases, though it is not clear why he was instrumental in setting up a mosque in Bangalore: in 1940, at the height of religious strife in India, he laid the foundation stone of the Jamia Masjid mosque near K.R. Market and the town hall in Bangalore.

==== Bangalore riots ====
A major part of Ismail's administration was spent in suppressing various kinds of public disturbances. He had to do a great deal of tight-rope walking in the face of popular agitations conducted by the Indian National Congress. He had to maintain good relations with top Congress leaders like Mahatma Gandhi and Jawaharlal Nehru on one hand, and with the maharaja's interests in his mind on the other; he did everything possible to suppress Congress movements in the state for fear of communal violence and unrest in Bangalore. It was this very fear which came to the fore over Sultanpet Ganapathi Disturbances in Bangalore in 1928, an upheaval that created the long-desired opportunity for Congress, finally gaining grounds in the illusive state of Mysore.

Following the death of Maharaja Krishnaraja Wadiyar IV in 1940, he continued as Diwan to Maharaja Jayachamaraja Wadiyar. However, he resigned in 1941 over differences.

==== Round Table conferences ====
As the maharaja's diwan, Ismail represented the kingdom and attended all three Round Table Conferences from November 1930 to January 1931.

- 1st Round Table conference
- 2nd Round Table conference
- 3rd Round Table Conference

=== Diwan of Jaipur ===
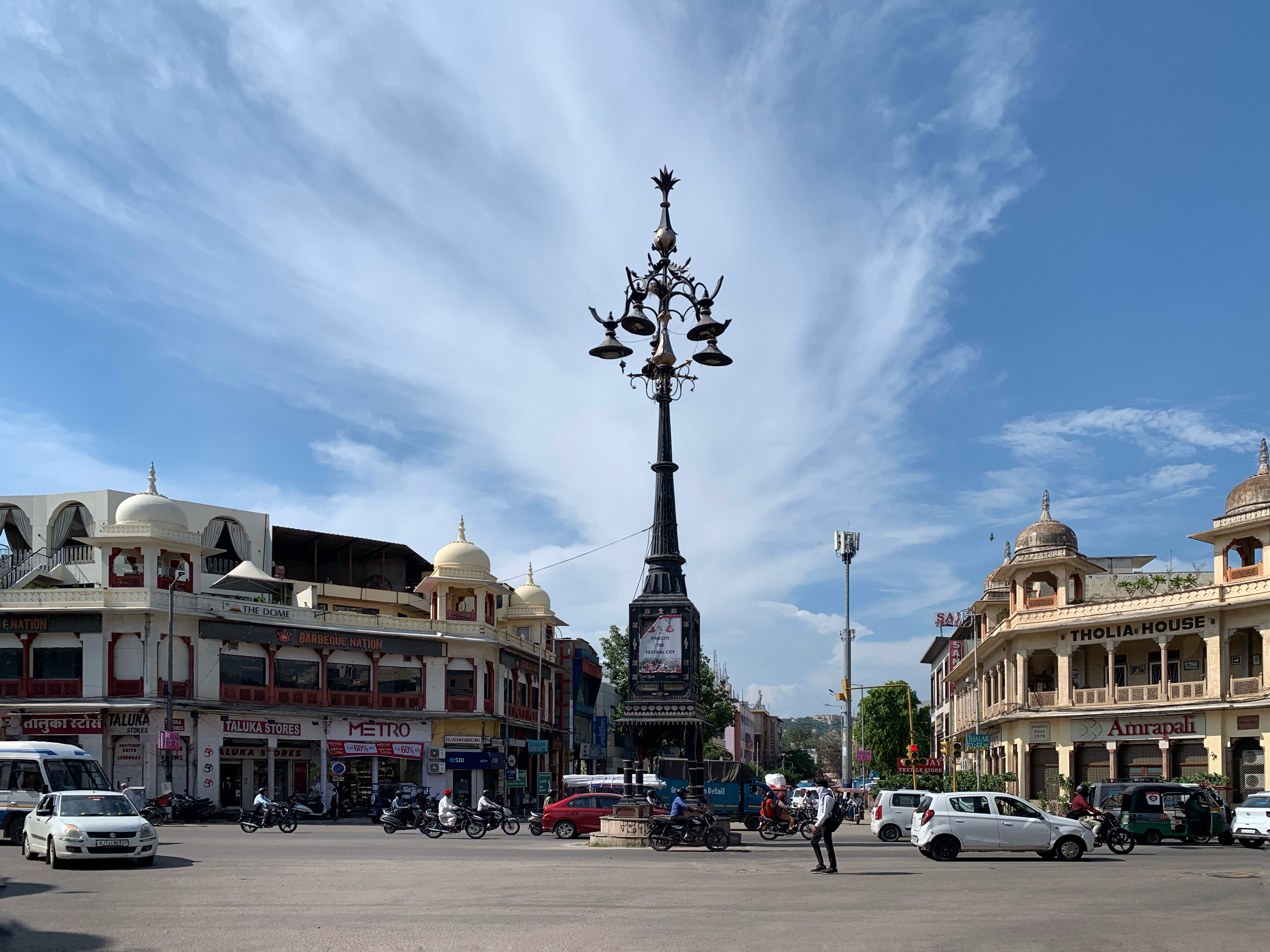
Mirza Ismail Road in Jaipur was named after him.

The Kingdom of Jaipur’s Diwan since 1939 Gyan Nath had taken with the support of the British a hardline against the Praja Mandal political organization who were pro- Congress. It was therefore a shock to them that following his resignation, Maharaja Sawai Man Singh II in 1941 appointed Ismail who they viewed as a progressive as his replacement. Soon after his appointment Ismail wrote to the Rajasthan Residency requesting that the maharaja and his family be referred to as “royal”. The British rejected this, being of the opinion that only the King-Emperor and family could be referred to as such. This caused one British official to write that Ismail was a ‘dictator of the “national socialist” variety’ and express the opinion that the sooner he was dismissed the better. Ismail immediately began cleaning up the walled old city of Jaipur, removing Hindu shrines from the middle of streets, encroachments on public streets and painting buildings, many for the first time in 25 years. Ismail’s desire to modernize the city was supported by the maharaja.

Soon after his arrival in Jaipur, in 1942, he constituted a committee on constitutional reforms. These efforts considerably enhanced Maharaja Sawai Man Singh II's reputation and his durbar in the Indian National Congress' circles. The main thoroughfare of Jaipur has been named Mirza Ismail Road in his memory.

Ghanshyam Das Birla was a close friend of Ismail's who used to fund the grand projects Ismail envisaged for Jaipur. When banks were beginning to be permitted to open branches in Jaipur, United Commercial Bank, under the chairmanship of Birla, was the first to be permitted to do so in 1945. The National Ballbearing Company was established under Ismail's guidance.

He chaired International PEN's Indian Writers Council held at Jaipur in 1945, whose participants included Sarojini Naidu and Edward Morgan Forster. Even after resigning as Diwan, he remained an adviser to the kingdom and its affairs pertaining to public infrastructure development projects. He was instrumental in the approval of a building for Jaipur Medical Association in 1945.

The Chamber of Commerce in Jaipur duly recorded Ismail's premiership as "the beginning of the industrial era of Jaipur."

=== Diwan of Hyderabad ===
In 1945, Muhammad Ali Jinnah had a fallout with Ismail when the latter refused to help build a greater Pakistan. Ismail entirely objected to the partitioning of India and there was nothing beyond a united India for him. Eventually, it came as no surprise when Jinnah heard that Ismail was considering moving to Hyderabad.

In 1946, he became Diwan of Hyderabad to Nizam Osman Ali Khan during the difficult years of the kingdom from 1946 to 1948. Ismail put forth his best skills on the issue of accession of Hyderabad into India and negotiated a "standstill agreement" with the Union of India for one year's period to resolve the issue amicably. Pro-India leaders like Mehadi Nawaz Jung, Akbar Ali Khan, Sohaibulla Khan, Ali Yavar Jung, and others supported Ismail's peace moves and tried to change the nizam's attitude from confrontation to coordination. However, with the assassination of Mahatma Gandhi, the nizam became emboldened, more set against acceding to India, and took on a militant stand. As a result, Ismail resigned in protest, which led to a very public and unpleasant interview by the nizam. Soon after, in 1948, as a result of insubordination from the kingdom, India launched Operation Polo and Hyderabad became part of the Indian Union in 1948.

== Honours ==
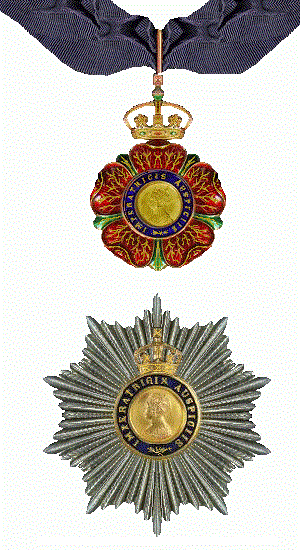
The Knight Commander of the Indian Empire order

Ismail was appointed OBE in 1922 by the British Government for his services to India and was appointed CIE in 1924. He was knighted in 1930 and was further appointed KCIE in 1936. In 1938, he was appointed Associate Commander of the Venerable Order of the Hospital of St. John of Jerusalem.

=== Places in honour ===
- Mirza Ismail Road, a Road in Jaipur, India
- Mirza Road, a Road in Mysore, India
- Sir Mirza Ismail Nagar, Bangalore

== Books ==
Ismail penned his memoirs under the title My Public Life published in 1954 before his death on 5 January 1959 at his house Windsor Lodge, Bangalore.

=== Essays, lectures and interactions ===
- Mahatma Gandhi -Sarvepalli Radhakrishnan (Page 143 onwards): "An Indian Statesman's Tribute" by Sir Mirza M. Ismail, KCIE (Dewan of Mysore; Bangalore, India)
- Indian Round Table Conference Proceedings
- The new India, 1948–1955: memoirs of an Indian civil servant By Asok Mitra
- Encyclopaedia of Higher Education: Convocation address By Suresh Kant Sharma (Pg 111-114) -Education and Unity for Economic Upliftment
- Sir Mirza M. Ismail: views and opinions on his retirement from the office of Dewan of Mysore.
- Studies on Dewan Sir Mirza Ismail: collection of seminar papers-Sūryanātha Kāmat
- Anecdotes of Quaid-i-Azam by Masud-ul-Hasan 1976
- International PEN Indian Writers in Council by K. R. Srinivasa Iyengar-Inaugural Address by Prime Minister, Sir Mirza Ismail

== Personal life ==
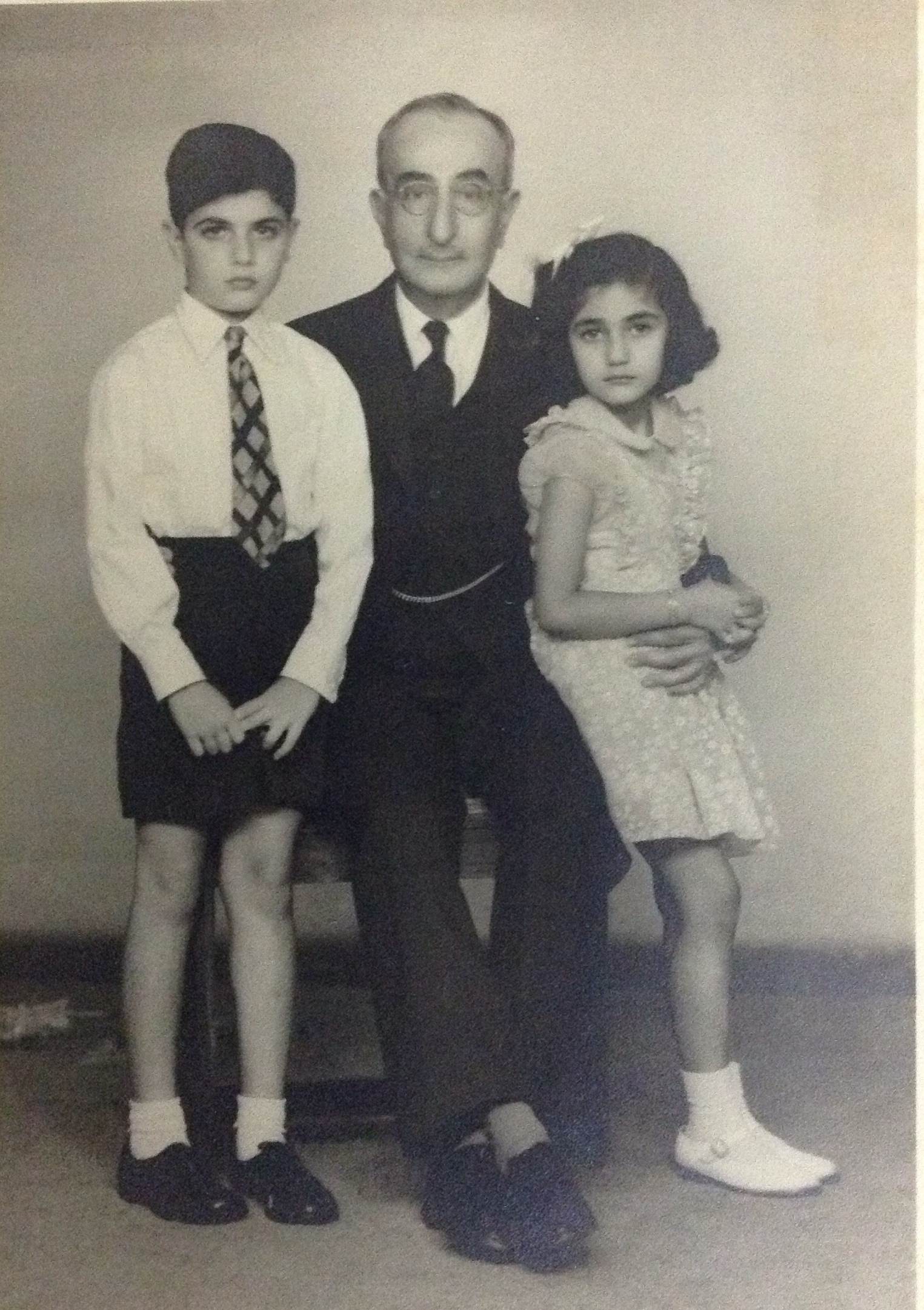
Mirza Ismail, with eldest children of Mirza Mahmud

Ismail married his maternal first-cousin Zeebundeh Begum Shirazi. She was the daughter of his mother, Begum Sanaa Shirazi's brother Mirza Shirazi. She was a poet who publish ten volumes of religious nowhas (or hymns) called Baiz-e-Shakira. The couple had three children: a son, Humayun Mirza; and two daughters, Shah Taj Begum Khaleeli and Gauhar Taj Begum Namazie.

Ismail inspired many in the family to live a life in the service of the country. His son Humayun Mirza who would become Diwan of Banganpalli. Post-independence, he would serve as a diplomat for a short stint before being transferred back to Delhi. He became a key advisor for the layout and administrative systems of the Ministry of External Affairs, which earned him a Padma Shri.

Ismail's grandson from Shah Taj Begum, Akbar Mirza Khaleeli, joined the Indian Foreign Service served as senior diplomat and advisor to the Indian government on Middle Eastern affairs for many years after his retirement. Shah Taj Begum's daughter, Ameneh, was married to Mirza Ali Ispahani from the House of Ispahani. He was the son of Mirza Mahmood Ispahani, the younger brother of both Mirza Ahmad Ispahani and Mirza Abol Hassan Ispahani.

Ismail's nephews left India at the time of partition, dividing the family to serve Pakistan instead. Agha Shahi became Foreign Minister, and Agha Hilaly a senior diplomat.

Ismail's granddaughter from Gauhar Taj Namazie, Shakereh, was murdered in 1991. The murderer was convicted with life imprisonment.

His great-grandson Fouaad Mirza is an Indian Olympic equestrian.

== Death ==
Ismail died on 5 January 1959 at his residence in Bangalore.

C. V. Raman paid eloquent tributes to Ismail: "For many years, in fair weather as well as in foul, he remained the truest of friend to me, ever ready to give support and advice. He leaves behind him a memory which will be treasured and cherished by all who have known him."

== See also ==
- Dancing on the Grave

Government offices
| Preceded by – | Dewan of Mysore; 1926–1941 | Succeeded by N. Madhava Rao |
| Preceded by Nawab Chhatari | Prime Minister of Hyderabad; 1946–1948 | Succeeded by Nawab Chhatari |
