= Mirza Road =

Road in Mysore, India

Coordinates: 12.30682368415014°N 76.66280793207153°E

Mirza Road is a road in Mysore city, Karnataka state, India.

== Etymology ==
Sir Mirza Ismail was the Diwan of Mysore from 1926 to 1940 when Krishna Raja Wadiyar IV was the Maharaja of Mysore. He succeeded Sir M. Visvesvaraya and was instrumental in developing many parks and gardens, including the famous Brindavan Gardens, apart from the Nishad Bagh.

== Location ==
The Road starts at Nanju Malige and terminates at Jayachamarajendra Circle and terminates at Vasanth Mahal, where Mysore District Institute of Education and Training and College of Teacher's Education are located. Nishad Bagh (Kuppanna Park), Putta mane Park, Police Commissioners Office & Parade Ground are located enroute.

== See also ==
- M. Kantharaj Urs Road
- Devaraj Urs Road, Mysore
