= Agha Aly Asker =

Horse trader and landowner (1808–1891)

- Born: Agha Ali Asker Shirazie; 1808; Shiraz, Sublime State of Persia
- Died: 1891 (aged 82–83); Bangalore, India
- Relatives: Mirza Ismail (grandson); Shakereh Khaleeli (great-granddaughter); Fouaad Mirza (descendant) <

Agha Aly Asker (1808–1891; née Agha Ali Asker Shirazie) was a Persian horse trader and landowner who emigrated to Bangalore, in India, in 1824 from Shiraz, Iran. He is considered the founding father of the Persian diaspora in the city whose legacy still lives on through the various colonial buildings he constructed at the behest of the Commissioner of Mysore Sir Mark Cubbon. Aly Asker was responsible for constructing the Governor's residence, the State Guesthouse- Balabrooie, Leela Nivas off Cunningham Crescent, among many others. He is also credited with putting Bangalore on the horse-racing map.

== Early life and family ==
Aly Asker was born in 1808, in Shiraz, Iran. He is the grandfather of Indian statesman Sir Mirza Ismail, the great-grandfather of philanthropist Shakereh Khaleeli and the great-great-great-grandfather of Indian equestrian Fouaad Mirza.

== Career ==
Agha Aly Asker was 16 when his brothers (Haji Mohammad Hashim & Mashadi Qasim) and he set sail to India from Iran along with 200 horses intending to trade them in Bangalore. They disembarked at Mangalore and made their way across the Western Ghats. While passing through Coorg, they were arrested on the suspicion of being British spies. Eventually released by the East India Company, they made their way to Bangalore through Mysore and sold their horses at the British Remount Depot in Mathigiri, Hosur to the British.

Haji Mohammad Hashim and Mashadi Qasim returned to Iran in 1825 leaving behind Aly Asker to expand the business. Agha Aly Asker grew to be a highly influential businessman with distinguished patrons that included the British Commissioner, Mark Cubbon, Hassan Ali Shah and the Maharaja of Mysore, Mummadi Krishnaraja Wodeyar III. He was also presented to the Prince of Wales (later Edward VIII) during a ceremonial visit to Mysore around 1889. Ali Asker was commissioned by Sir Mark Cubbon to build around 100 bungalows on Palace Road near High Point, Sankey Road, Cunningham Road and Richmond Road. He also built the Governor's residence and the State guesthouse- Balabrooie. Aly Asker established the Shia Persian cemetery on Hosur Road. He was also responsible for creating the Ali Asker Waqf Estate which owns the land upon which the Windsor Manor Hotel is built in Bangalore.

== Death ==
Agha Aly Asker died in 1891; in Bangalore. He was buried at the Hosur Road Cemetery. Before his demise, Aly Asker willed Rs.800 for a mosque to be built in Richmond Town to meet the needs of the growing Shia community. The Masjid-e-Askari was built in 1909, it still remains as the city's only long-standing Shia mosque.

== Legacy ==
A short section of road between Infantry Road and Cunningham Road is named after Agha Ali Asker in Bangalore. "Agha Aly Asker", written by Syeda Mirza deals with the life and contributions of Agha Aly Asker.

== See also ==
- Dancing on the Grave
