= Rehane =

Rehane is a given name. Notable people with the name include:

- Rehane Abrahams, South African performance artist
- Rehane Yavar Dhala (born 1969), Indian fashion designer
