= Rehane Yavar Dhala =

Indian fashion designer

- Born: 27 January 1969 (age 57); Paris, France
- Education: European Institute of Design and Calligaris, Rome, Italy
- Label: Rehane
- Spouse: Muhammad Yavar Dhala
- Parent(s): Akbar Mirza Khaleeli, Shakereh Khaleeli

Rehane Yavar Dhala née Rehane Khaleeli (born 27 January 1969), best known as REHANE, is a fashion designer from Chennai, India.

Rehane's flagship store is in Chennai. Other stores include Evoluzione in Bangalore, Kimaya in Mumbai and Dubai, Indomix in New York City, Chubara in Washington, D.C., and Strip in Hyderabad.

== See also ==
- Dancing on the Grave
