= Jo Tera Hai Woh Mera Hai =

- Promotional release poster
- Directed by: Raj Trivedi
- Written by: Aditya Rawal
- Produced by: Jyoti Deshpande; Ajay G Rai
- Starring: Paresh Rawal; Amit Sial; Faisal Malik; Sonali Kulkarni; Sonnalli Seygall; Jatin Sarin
- Music by: Tushar Lall
- Production companies: Jio Studios; JAR Pictures
- Distributed by: JioCinema
- Release date: 20 September 2024
- Running time: 101 minutes
- Country: India
- Language: Hindi

Jo Tera Hai Woh Mera Hai (transl. What's Yours Is Mine) is a 2024 Indian Hindi-language comedy drama film directed by Raj Trivedi and written by Aditya Rawal. Produced by Jyoti Deshpande and Ajay G Rai under Jio Studios and JAR Pictures, it stars Paresh Rawal, Amit Sial, Faisal Malik, Sonali Kulkarni, Jatin Sarin and Sonnalli Seygall. It premiered on JioCinema on 20 September 2024.

== Plot ==
Mitesh's ambition leads him to devise a reverse mortgage scheme aimed at conning an elderly man, Govinda (Paresh Rawal), out of his bungalow, which Mitesh has coveted since childhood. He plans to buy his family's love and approval through financial means, believing that owning the house will fulfil his dreams.

As Mitesh navigates this precarious situation, he faces numerous challenges. The old man unexpectedly refuses to die, complicating Mitesh’s scheme and forcing him to confront the consequences of his actions. This comedic twist highlights Mitesh's increasingly desperate attempts to maintain control over his life while balancing familial responsibilities and romantic entanglements involving his wife, Rukmini (Sonali Kulkarni), and his mistress, Preeti (Sonnalli Seygall).

== Cast ==
- Paresh Rawal as Govinda Lal Mehta
- Amit Sial as Mitesh Meghani
- Faisal Malik as Rajan
- Sonali Kulkarni as Rukmini Meghani
- Sonnalli Seygall as Preeti
- Jatin sarin as Chhotu
- Bharati Achrekar as Rukmini's Mom
- Nitesh Pandey as Mehmood
- Sejal Gupta as Rhea
- Ravi Shankar Jaiswal as Tawde

== Production ==
The film was announced on JioCinema. The trailer of the film was released on 12 September 2024.

== Music ==
Jo Tera Hai Woh Mera Hai

Soundtrack album by Tushar Lall
- Released: September 10, 2024
- Genre: Feature film soundtrack
- Length: 11:22
- Language: Hindi
- Label: Times Music

Track listing
No.	Title	Lyrics	Singer(s)	Length
1.	"Baba Ji"	KS Abhishek	Kailash Kher	2:38
2.	"Dil-e-Nadaan"	KS Abhishek	Osho Jain	3:12
3.	"Khatmal"	Anupam Siddhant	Tushar Lall, Kaustubh More	3:36
4.	"Khwaab"	KS Abhishek	Tushar Lall, Omkar Patil, Shikha Sonik	1:56
Total length:				11:22

== Reception ==
Archika Khurana of The Times Of India rated the film 3 stars out of 5. Tanmayi Savadi of Times Now gave the film a rating of 3/5 stars.

A critic from Scroll.in reviewed the film.
