= Shakereh Khaleeli =

Indian murder victim (1947–1991)

- Born: Shakereh Namazie; 27 August 1947; Madras (now Chennai), India
- Died: 28 April 1991 (aged 43); Bangalore, Karnataka, India
- Spouses: Akbar Mirza Khaleeli (m. 1964; div. 1985) Swami Shradhananda (m. 1986–1991)
- Children: 4, including Rehane Yavar Dhala
- Relatives: Mirza Ismail (grandfather); Agha Aly Asker (great-grandfather)

Shakereh Khaleeli (née Namazie; 1947–1991) was an Indian real estate developer and philanthropist who was murdered by her second husband, Swami Shradhananda (Murali Manohar Mishra). She had been previously married to Indian diplomat Akbar Mirza Khaleeli, the Indian envoy to Iran and Australia. They divorced in 1985 and she married Shradhananda the following year.

Her family noticed she was missing in 1991 and alerted the police. In 1994, after three years of a sting operation the Karnataka Police got an admission of murder from Shradhananda and he led the police to her remains which were buried in her own home. She had been drugged, suffocated, and buried in a coffin-like box. He was convicted of the murder in 2005 and sentenced to death. The sentence was commuted to life imprisonment in 2008.

== Family and background ==
Shakereh was born on 27 August 1947 in Madras to an Indian-Persian Muslim family. The family were also residents of Singapore since the early 1900s where Shakereh went to school.

She was the daughter of Gulam Hussain Namazie and Gauhar Taj Begum Namazie née Mirza, the youngest daughter of Sir Mirza Ismail the Diwan of Mysore, Jaipur and Hyderabad. Gauhar Taj was a socialite and philanthropist involved in many charitable organisations in Singapore. Shakereh's elder brother, Mirza Karim Namazie, was a television journalist.

Her paternal grandfather was Mohammad Namazie, a trader with interests in the Middle East, Southeast Asia and southern India. Ghulam Hussain Namazie was responsible for opening Capitol Theatre, Singapore which was Singapore's first cinema hall. He was also an equestrian and involved with the Turf Club where the family horses won many prestigious trophies. Later he would join the board of the larger Namazie Group and help with their many diverse business interests, especially the family's vast real estate portfolio.

== First marriage ==
In 1965, at age 18, Shakereh married her first cousin Akbar Mirza Khaleeli from Madras. Their mothers were sisters Shah Taj Begum Khaleeli (née Mirza) and Gauhar Taj Namazie (both daughters of Sir Mirza Ismail).

Akbar Mirza Khaleeli was an outstanding sportsman and student who completed his schooling from Bishop Cotton Boys' School, Bangalore and later, Doveton Corrie Protestant Schools Association. He studied law at Loyola College, Chennai. He was considered the best tennis player in South India by Ramesh Krishnan but instead joined the Indian Foreign Service in 1954. He went on to serve in various posts in Delhi, Baghdad, Colombo, Paris and Amman. He served as Chief of Protocol in 1976 and later served as Indian Ambassador to Iran. Shakereh was with him throughout most of his postings, except during the time of the Iranian Revolution.

While her husband was in Iran, Shakereh moved to Bangalore and engaged in construction, following her great-grandfather Agha Aly Asker, known for his buildings in Bangalore. She first built a family home on Sankey Road, Abshot Layout, and a house for her mother on Ali Asker Road. She then redeveloped other family properties, evicting some of the tenants.

They had four daughters: Zeebundeh Khaleeli (b. 1965 in Madras), Sabah Bakache (b. 1966 in Delhi), Rehane Yavar Dhala (b. 1969 in Paris), and Begum Esmath Khaleeli Clark (b. 1972 in Amman, Jordan).

The couple divorced in 1984. Akbar Khaleeli would go on to become the Ambassador to Italy, High Commissioner to Australia and Advisor to the Government on Middle Eastern Affairs.

== Second marriage ==
Murali Manohar Mishra, who had renamed himself as Swami Shradhananda, first met Shakereh and her husband in Bangalore in 1982. Akbar Mirza Khaleeli then took up a post in Iran and, on his return, Shakereh divorced him. Six months after her divorce, in April 1986, Shakereh "shunned her family and social norms" to marry Shradhananda. She allowed Shradhananda access to her money and property. The couple reportedly quarrelled over her relationship with her daughters.

== Murder ==
In 1991, Sabah, Shakereh's second daughter, was unable to locate her mother. Despite repeated enquiries about Shakereh's whereabouts to Shradhananda, he consistently avoided giving a proper answer. In 1992, Sabah filed for a habeas corpus at the Ashok Nagar Police Station in Bangalore. For three years Shradhananda managed to evade questions from Shakereh's family and friends, as well as legal authorities of the state. He lived lavishly in Bangalore, pretending his wife was on a perpetual holiday.

In May 1994, after a sting operation, the police of Karnataka uncovered the skeletal remains of Shakereh buried deep in the courtyard of her own house. Shakereh's murder was considered one of the most heinous crimes in Indian criminal history, deeply affecting the nation.

Shakereh had been killed on 28 April 1991. She had been drugged, then placed on a mattress which was deposited in the coffin-like box, already lying in the pit that had been dug in preparation. When Shakereh's skeletal remains were recovered and the mattress was removed, one of her hands was found clutching the mattress which lay below her; this, along with other factors, supported the idea that she had been alive when buried.

== Prosecution ==
Swami Shradhananda was taken into judicial custody after admitting to the crime. The case became an important milestone in the Indian judicial system, as it was the first case where the exhumation process was recorded on video, as well as the first time that DNA tests and videotapes of the exhumation were accepted as evidence in India.

== Trial and sentence ==
The case was first brought to trial in late 1997. On 21 May 2005, the Civil and Sessions Judge B.S. Totad sentenced Swami to capital punishment by hanging. Shradhananda reportedly portrayed no emotions as he stood in the dock. The order read: "From the facts and circumstances of the case, it is clear that the said murder has created such a fear in the minds of the family and in the community to live peacefully in society. There are no mitigating circumstances or factors to award a lesser punishment ... having regard to the nature of the methodology in committing the murder for gain, it is a fit case for capital punishment." The judge directed the jail authorities not to execute the death sentence until they received confirmation from the high court.

On 12 September 2005 in the high court, a two-bench judge composed of Justices S.R. Bannurmath and A.C. Kabbin confirmed the death sentence. Terming it the "rarest of rare cases" in their order, the division bench stated: "The accused had murdered his wife in a diabolical and a well-planned scheme. As such, the death penalty imposed on him is liable to be confirmed. Anything less than a penalty of greatest severity for any serious crime is thought to be a measure of tolerance that is unwarranted and unwise. The sessions court is justified in awarding death penalty to the accused."

== Appeal ==
An appeal notice was lodged in July 2005. On 18 February 2006 Shradhananda issued notice to the Karnataka Government on special leave petition (SLP) questioning the high court judgment that had confirmed the death sentence. The Supreme Court Bench of Justice Ashok Bhan and Justice Tarun Chatterjee stayed the high court judgment. On 22 July 2008 a life sentence for Shradhananda was ordered by the Indian Supreme Court in New Delhi.

== In popular culture ==
In 2023, Amazon Prime Video released a four-part documentary series Dancing on the Grave produced by India Today Originals Production.
