= Bangalore disturbances =

The Bangalore disturbances of 1928, also known as Ganapati Galabhe and Hindu-Muslim Gharshane, were a series of Hindu-Muslim clashes which took place in the city of Bengaluru in June – July 1928 over construction of a niche on a Ganesha idol in a school premises. These were the first major communal disturbances of Bengaluru.

== Causes ==
In June 1928, the students of Hindu Anglo-Vernacular School, Sultanpet, Bengaluru, requested the contractor who was undertaking repair work to the school building, to construct a small shrine or niche over an existing Ganesha idol in the premises of the Hindu Anglo-Vernacular School. The Ganesha idol was stowed away in a passage of the school. The Director of Public Instructions, who controls schools, inspected and ordered the school to shift the Ganesha idol into a room pending further instructions. The students were fond of the Ganesha idol, who is the deity of education and also remover of all obstructions, and students demanded the restoration of the Ganesha idol to its original place. The students of neighbouring schools of the city joined the protest. This act had the support of an editorial in a newspaper Veerakesari run by Sitarama Sastri, a Hindu leader, and also from other newspapers in general.

== Events ==
Indian National Congress leaders Ramlal Tiwari, Jamkandi Bhima Rao and H. V. Subramanyam entered the fray, supporting the students' demand of restoring the idol to its original place.

The idol dispute soon evolved into a general protest by Hindus over Muslim dominance and bias in the administration and bureaucracy. They raised the slogan Melaturukkaru, Kelageturukkaru (Muslims above, Muslims below), referring to the monopolization by Muslims of the upper as well as lower levels of the state bureaucracy.

Tiwari, Subrahmanyam and Bhima Rao were arrested on 27 July 1928. A procession of students made its way to Central Jail, Bengaluru where the arrested leaders were kept and were lathi-charged by the state police. The idol was restored to its original place on 29 July and worship at the Ganapati shrine was renewed by over 5,000 Hindus, which prompted the Muslims to attack them with shouts of "Deen, Deen". This led to protests from the Muslims which were led by municipal president and Muslim community leader Abbas Khan, who lived opposite the school. Muslims fired from a roof of a nearby cycle shop and also reportedly from the upper floor of the house of Abbas Khan and at least one boy was hit by a bullet. 123 Hindus and 11 Muslims were injured before the government brought the situation under control. Only four cases of injuries of civilians were serious, of which one was a bullet wound. There was an attempt by disgruntled sections of society to spread a rumour that one boy named Satyanarayana was killed by the fire from the housetop of Abbas Khan (in reality the boy died of dysentery), to the extent that this rumour was reported to the Resident as well as to the Governor General. The instigators were punished and the editor of Veerakesari was severely reprimanded. This was the first communal disturbance of Bangalore city and first major communal disturbance of Mysore State.

=== Effects ===
The Diwan, Sir Mirza Ismail, advised the Maharaja of Mysore, who was residing at Mysuru, "not to come from Mysore to Bangalore till after (the) arrested leaders have been tried". The Diwan was worried and thought that his position had become shaky due to the disturbances.

== Enquiry ==
The Maharaja of Mysore constituted a committee headed by Sir M. Visvesvaraya to enquire into the disturbances, and the committee observed that law and order was completely broken down during the disturbances and the government favoured one side in the incident. The members of the committee were Justice D. K. Rama Rao, H. G. Basavappa, Gulam Ahmed Kalami, V. Manickavelu Mudaliyar, B. Nagappa Bar-at-Law, and Ralph Nye. The report of the committee had a "qualifying note" by one of the members, Gulam Ahmed Kalami, who did not fully agree with the findings of the committee.
