= W. M. Namjoshi =

Indian architect

Waman Moreshwar Namjoshi (born 1907) was an Indian architect known for his Streamline Moderne designs, especially for cinemas.

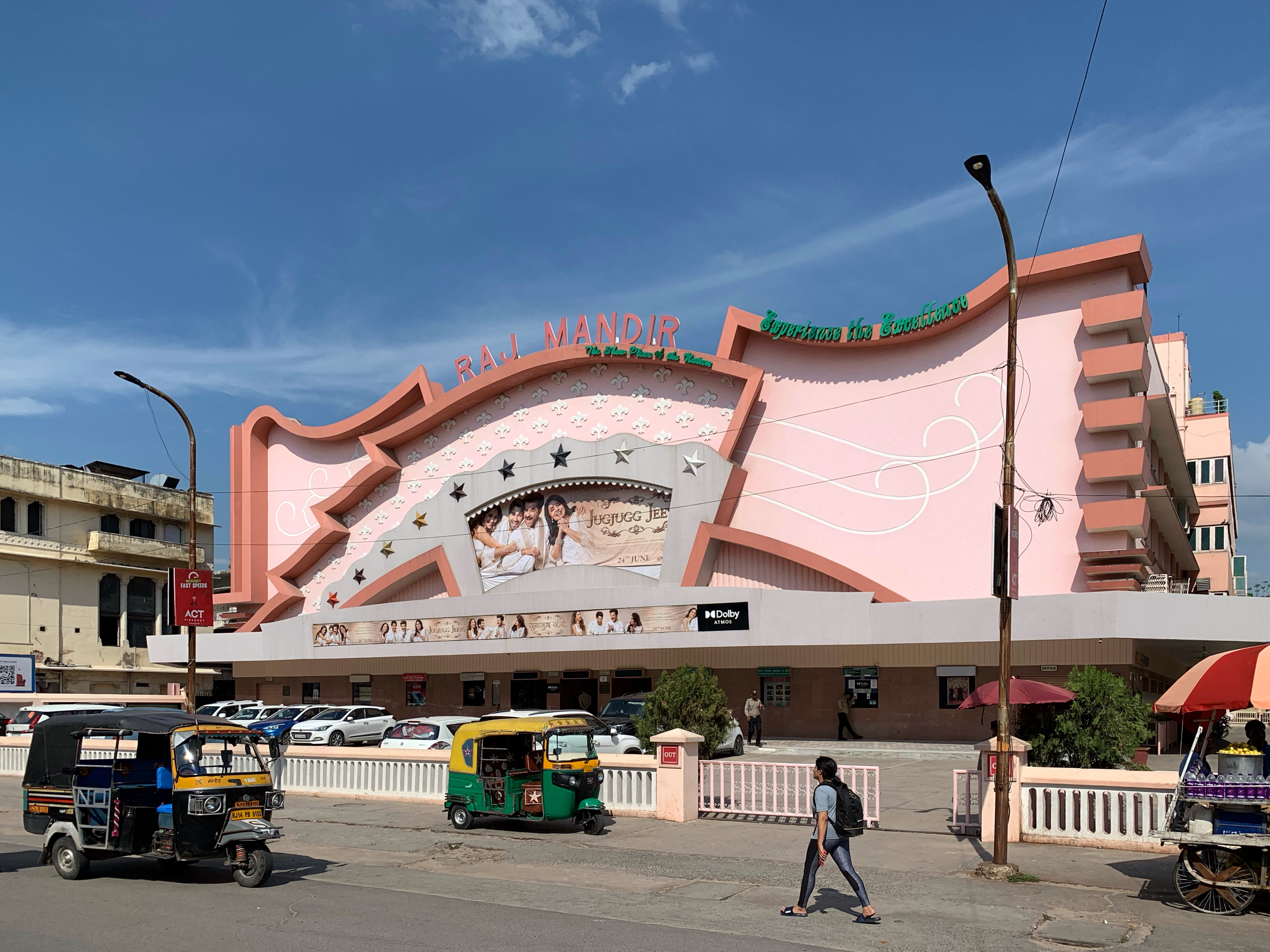
Raj Mandir Cinema in Jaipur, completed in the 1970s

He designed the Raj Mandir Cinema in Jaipur. He also helped in the design of the Liberty Cinema in Bombay.

== See also ==
- Art Deco in Mumbai
