= Mirza Ismail Road =

Road in Jaipur city

- M.I. Road
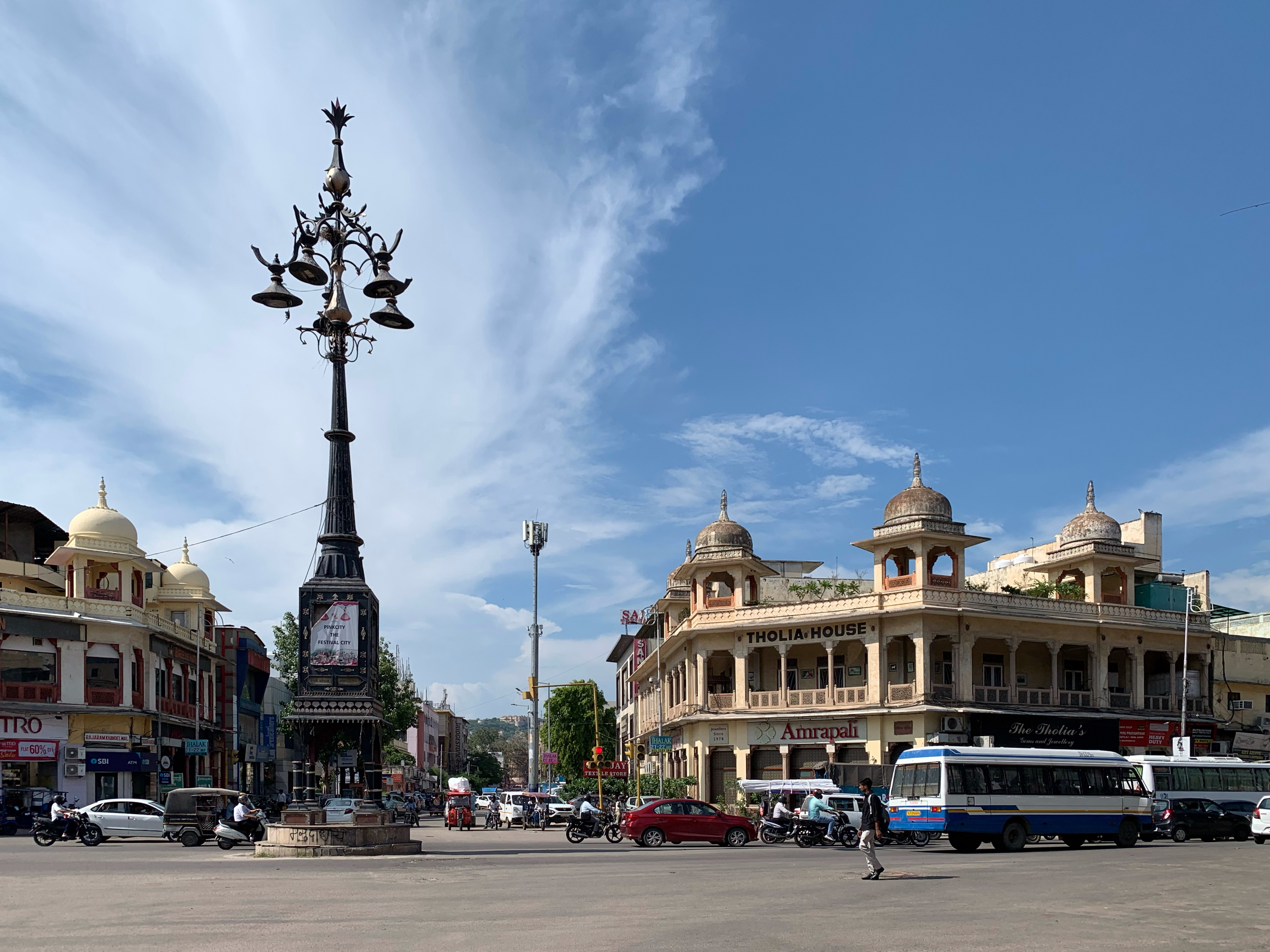
- Panch Batti Circle where M.I. Road crosses Bhagwan Das Road
- Maintained by: Jaipur Development Authority; Jaipur Municipal Corporation
- Location: Jaipur
- Nearest Jaipur Metro station: Badi Chaupar
- West end: Collectorate Circle
- East end: Ghat Gate

Mirza Ismail Road, popularly known as M.I. Road, is one of the main roads in Jaipur city in Rajasthan state in India. The road runs from Sanganeri Gate to Government Hostel. There are several landmarks on the road namely Sanganeri Gate, Ajmeri Gate, Rajasthali emporium, Niros restaurant, Raj Mandir Cinema, Jaipur and GPO. The road is named after Sir Mirza Ismail the Prime Minister of Jaipur Princely State.

Jaipur was designed in such a way that all major roads of other areas eventually leads to M.I. Road. It is thus also called the heart of Jaipur.

== Description ==
M.I. Road starts from Collectorate Circle and ends at Ghat Gate where it becomes Agra Road, which eventually meets NH 21 and NH 248.
