= Raj Mandir Cinema =

Cinema in Jaipur, India

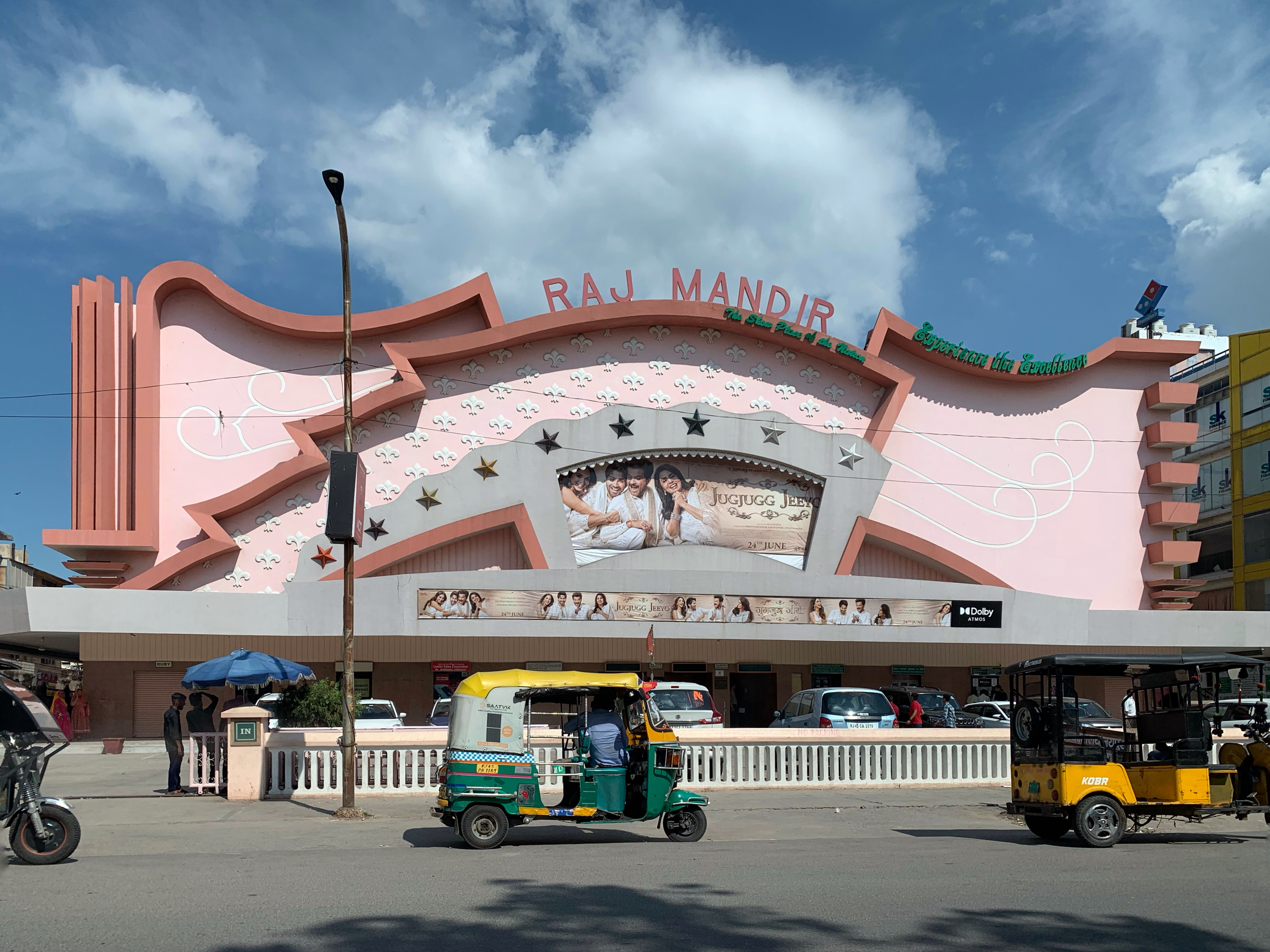
- Raj Mandir

- Location within Jaipur Location within Rajasthan
- Alternative names: RajMandir

General information
- Type: Single Screen Theater
- Architectural style: Streamline Moderne (Art Moderne)
- Location: Panch Batti, B-16, Panch Batti, Bhagwan Das Rd, Jaipur - 302001, Jaipur, Rajasthan, India
- Coordinates: 26°54′56″N 75°48′37″E
- Completed: June 1976; 50 years ago
- Inaugurated: 1 June 1976
- Client: Kushalchand Surana

Design and construction
- Architect: W.M. Namjoshi

Other information
- Seating capacity: 854

Website
- https://rajmandircinema.com

Raj Mandir Cinema is a movie theatre in Jaipur in Rajasthan state in India. Situated on the Bhagwan Das Road, near M.I. Road, the meringue-shaped auditorium opened in 1976, and over the years has seen many movie premieres of Hindi films, and has become a popular symbol of Jaipur. The theatre often referred to as 'Cinema Ka Mandir' is equipped with the latest technology in sound and projection with Dolby Atmos and SLS speakers, the first in the state of Rajasthan. An important landmark and tourist destination, the cinema hall has been accorded the status of largest single screen theatre in Asia.

== History ==
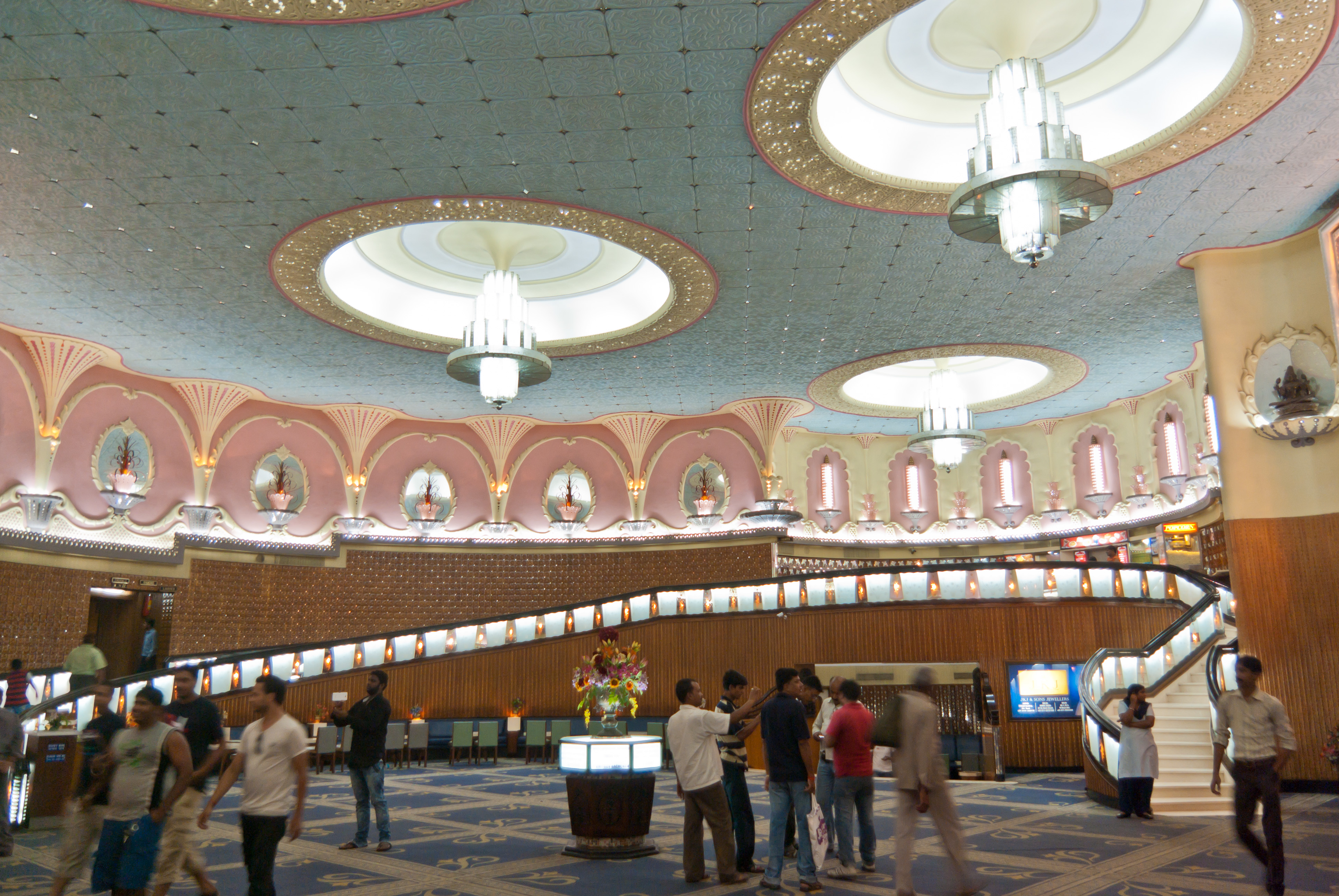
Raj Mandir Cinema interior

Originally the brainchild of Mehtab Chandra Golcha, it opened on 1 June 1976 with the film "Charas" which was a charitable fund raiser show organized by Manav Hitkari Sangh. It was designed by architect W. M. Namjoshi in Art Moderne style (Streamline Moderne or late Art Deco). It was the last cinema built by the Jaipur-based Golcha/Surana family, and also the 34th and last cinema hall designed by the architect, who designed cinema halls all over India, between 1938 and 1976, including art deco masterpieces like Golcha Cinema, Delhi (now closed), Kiran Cinema, Chandigarh and Maratha Mandir, Mumbai, .

Known for its large size as well as opulent and meringue interiors, Raj Mandir remains an important part of the tourist circuit, and thus usually remains full despite its size. The Bhuramal Rajmal Surana group, a prominent Jaipur jewellery house, owns and operates the cinema. The nine stars on the exterior signify nine gemstones in the Navaratna style, an homage to the owners' jewellery house.

== Trailer launch ==
Bhool Bhulaiyaa 3 film trailer was launched on 9 October 2024, at the iconic Raj Mandir Cinema with lead actors Kartik Aaryan, Triptii Dimri and Vidya Balan attending the event.

Jaat film trailer was launched on 24 March 2025, at the Raj Mandir Cinema with lead actors Sunny Deol, Randeep Hooda, Vineet Kumar Singh, director Gopichand Malineni and producers Naveen Yerneni and T. G. Prasad. At the launch event Sunny Deol also praised Rajasthani folk deity Veer Teja.

== Notes ==
- Bhuramal Rajmal Surana, owner Of Rajmandir Cinema
