= Calligaris =

Calligaris is an Italian surname. Notable people with the surname include:

- Chiara Calligaris (born 1971), Italian Olympic sailor
- Mauro Calligaris (1952–2000), Italian Olympic swimmer
- Novella Calligaris (born 1954), Italian Olympic swimmer, sister of Mauro
- Romana Calligaris (1924–2002), Italian swimmer, mother of Mauro and Novella
- Sergio Calligaris (1941–2023), Argentine-born pianist, composer and piano teacher
- Viola Calligaris (born 1996), Swiss footballer
