= Jayachamarajendra Wadiyar =

Maharaja of Mysore and governor of Mysore and Madras

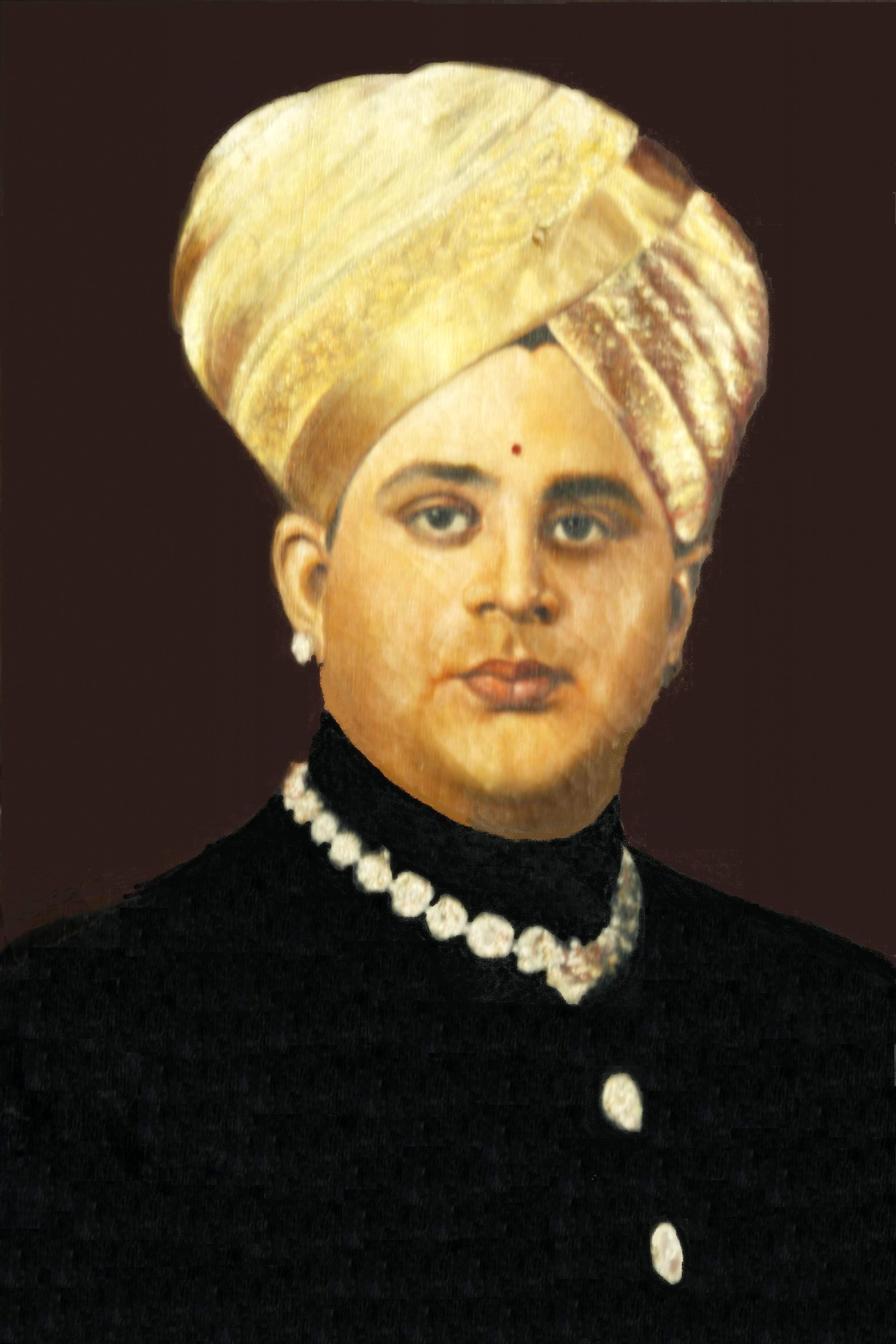

25th Maharaja of Mysore
- Reign: 3 August 1940 – 25 January 1950
- Coronation: 8 September 1940, Palace of Mysore
- Predecessor: Krishnaraja Wadiyar IV
- Titular reign: 25 January 1950 – 28 December 1971
- Successor: Position abolished by the 26th Amendment of the Indian Constitution

25th Head of the Wadiyar dynasty
- Tenure: 3 August 1940 – 23 September 1974
- Predecessor: Krishnaraja Wadiyar IV
- Successor: Srikantadatta Narasimharaja Wadiyar

Rajpramukh of Mysore State
- In office 26 January 1950 – 1 November 1956
- Preceded by: Position Established
- Succeeded by: Position Abolished

Governor of Mysore State
- In office 1 November 1956 – 4 May 1964
- Chief Minister: B. D. Jatti
- Preceded by: Position Established
- Succeeded by: S M Srinagesh

Governor of Madras State
- In office 4 May 1964 – 28 June 1966
- Preceded by: Bhishnuram Medhi
- Succeeded by: Sardar Ujjal Singh
- Born: 18 July 1919; Mysore Palace, Mysore, Mysore State, British India (present-day Karnataka, India)
- Died: 23 September 1974 (aged 55); Bangalore Palace, Bangalore, Karnataka, India
- Spouse: Satya Prema Kumari (m. 1938, div. 1940); Tripura Sundari Ammani (m. 1942)
- Issue: Gayatri Devi (1946–1974); Meenakshi Devi (1951–2015); Srikantadatta Narasimharaja Wadiyar (1953–2013); Kamakshi Devi (b. 1954); Indrakshi Devi (b. 1956); Vishalakshi Devi (1962–2018)
- House: Wadiyar
- Father: Yuvaraja Kanteerava Narasimharaja Wadiyar
- Mother: Yuvarani Kempu Cheluvaja Amanni
- Religion: Hinduism

Jayachamarajendra Wadiyar (18 July 1919 – 23 September 1974), sometimes simply Jayachamaraja Wadiyar, was the twenty-fifth and last ruling Maharaja of Mysore, reigning from 1940 to 1950, who later served as the governor of Mysore until 1964 and as governor of Madras from 1964 to 1966.

Wadiyar ascended the throne upon the sudden demise of his uncle Maharaja Krishnaraja Wadiyar IV. His reign as King began in 1940 during the onset of World War II in Europe and concluded with his merging the Kingdom into the Dominion of India in 1947 but continued as maharaja until India's constitution into a republic in 1950. Kuvempu, his Kannada teacher and the vice-chancellor of Mysore University, remarked upon his ceding the kingdom: "Whereas kings have become so upon assuming thrones, he became a great king by renouncing one". C. Hayavadana Rao, a noted historian, referred to the maharaja in the preface of his unfinished book as a "supporter of every good cause aiming at the moral and material progress of the people".

== Early life ==
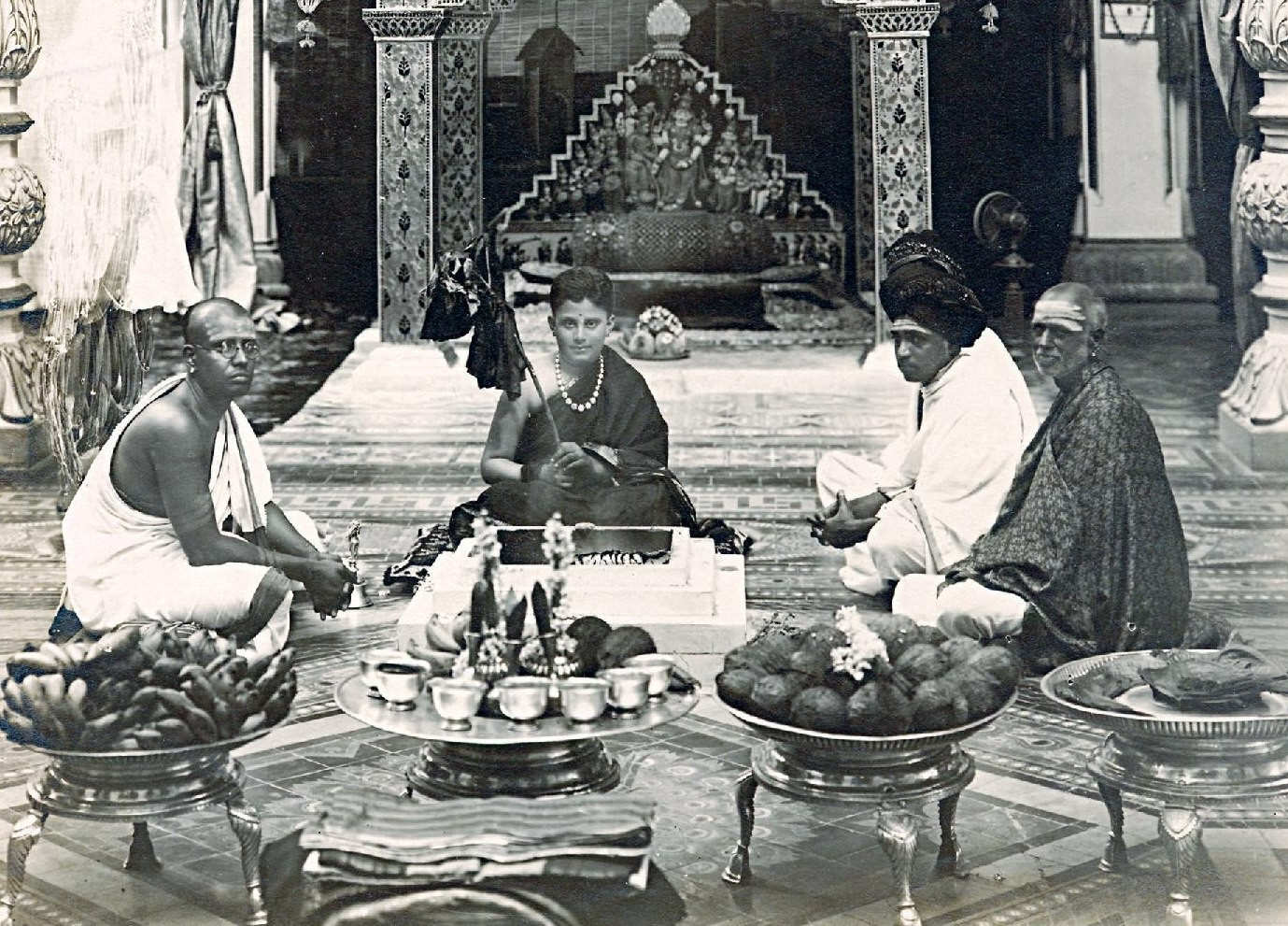
Ramasesha Sastri conducting the sacred thread investiture ceremony of Prince Jayachamarajendra Wodeyar

Jayachamarajendra Wadiyar was born on 18 July 1919 at Mysore Palace as the only son and the last child of Yuvaraja Kanteerava Narasimharaja Wadiyar and Yuvarani Kempu Cheluvajamanni. He had three elder sisters: Princesses Vijaya Devi, Sujayakantha Devi, and Jayachamundi Devi.

Prince Jayachamarajendra Wadiyar's basic education was arranged at the Royal School, Mysore, where he was a classmate of renowned Kannada writer and film maker Chaduranga. The young Prince was taught Sanskrit and Kannada by teachers like Maha Asthan Vidwan Motaganahalli Ramasesha Sastri, who also conducted his Upanayana (sacred thread investiture) and Aksharabhyasa ceremonies at the Mysore Palace.

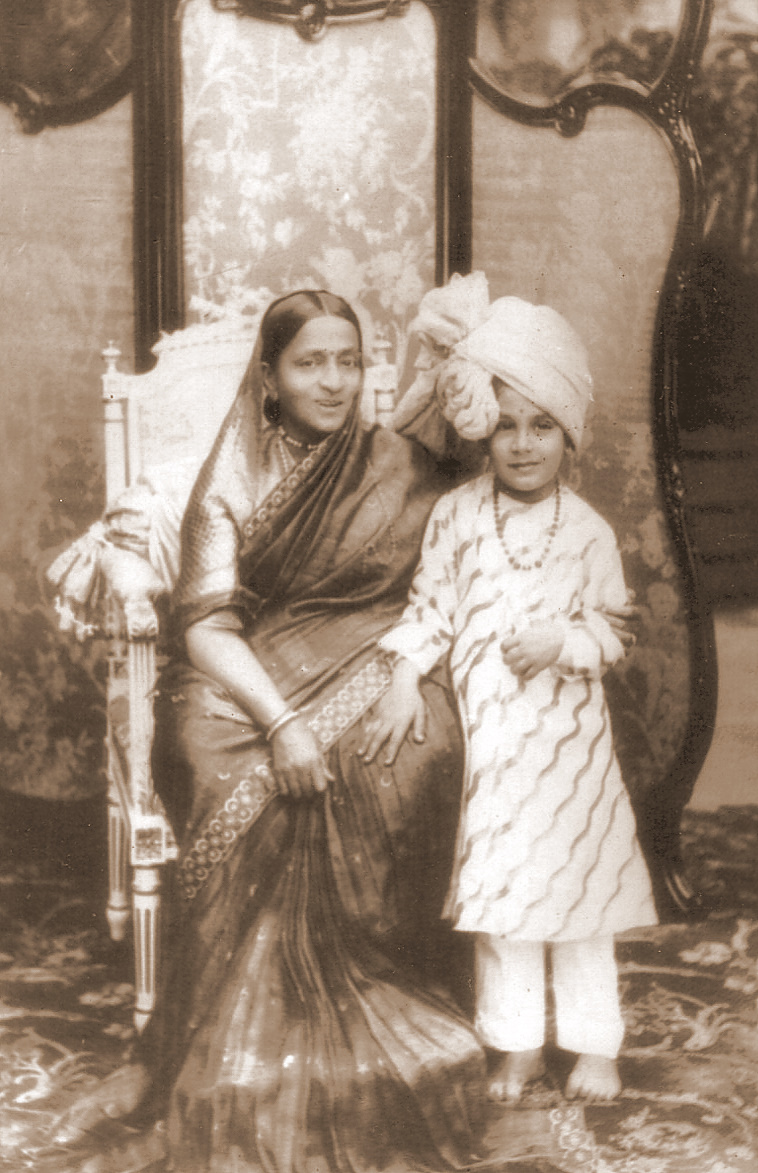
The young Yuvaraja Jayachamaraja Wadiyar with his grandmother, once regent, and Queen Mother Maharani Kempananjammanni Devi

Jayachamarajendra Wadiyar graduated from Maharaja's College, Mysore, in 1938, earning five awards and gold medals from Mysore University. He was married the same year, on 15 May 1938, to Maharani Satya Prema Kumari at the Palace. He toured Europe during 1939, visiting many associations in London and became acquainted with many artists and scholars.

== Reign ==
=== Accession ===
In March 1940, Jayachamarajendra Wadiyar lost his father Yuvaraja Kanteerava Narasimharaja Wadiyar who was second in line to the throne. Five months later, his reigning uncle, Maharaja Krishnaraja Wadiyar IV too expired, leaving his only nephew, Jayachamaraja Wadiyar, to succeed him to reign in what was dubbed one of the most prosperous states in Asia. He ascended the throne of the Kingdom of Mysore on 8 September 1940 and was democratic in his administration, celebrated by his subjects as his uncle was. With the accession, he was inducted as a freemason.

=== Ceding the kingdom ===
Jayachamarajendra Wadiyar was the first ruler to accede to merge his kingdom with the newly formed tentative Indian Union after India's independence in 1947. He signed an instrument of accession with the Union on the eve of India's attainment of independence on 15 August 1947. The result took three years to materialise owing to the drafting of a constitution for the country in the meantime.

With the constitution of India into a republic, the Kingdom of Mysore was merged with the Republic on 26 January 1950. After the state was absorbed into the Dominion of India, he was granted a privy purse, certain privileges, and the use of the title Maharaja of Mysore by the Government of India, However, all forms of compensation were ended in 1971 by the 26th Amendment to the Constitution of India.

Wadiyar was made the Rajpramukh of Mysore State in 26 January 1950. After the integration of the neighbouring Kannada-majority parts of the Madras and Hyderabad States, the title was changed, and he became the first Governor of the reorganised Mysore State, from 1 November 1956 to 4 May 1964. He was later appointed Governor of Madras from 4 May 1964 to 28 June 1966.

== Contributions ==
=== Sports ===
Wadiyar was a good horseman and a tennis player. He was also well known for his marksmanship and was highly sought after by his subjects whenever a rogue elephant or a man-eating tiger attacked their immediate surroundings in and around the city of Mysore. There are many wildlife trophies attributed to him in the Palace Collections.

Wadiyar is credited for financially supporting the tennis player Ramanathan Krishnan participate at Wimbledon. The maharaja also encouraged and aided the cricketer E. A. S. Prasanna's visit to the West Indies as his father was otherwise reluctant to send him.

=== Literature ===
Wadiyar was a man of letters: he was an avid reader and writer and an acknowledged authority of Indian philosophy. His literary works deal with a range of disciplines including administration, theology, history, civics, philosophy, administrative studies, among others.

Wadiyar sponsored the translation of many classics from Sanskrit to Kannada as part of the "Jayachamaraja Grantha Ratna Mala", including 35 parts of the Rigveda. These are essentially ancient, sacred scriptures in Sanskrit which at that time were not available in Kannada language comprehensively. All the books contain original text in Kannada accompanied by Kannada translation. As the courtier and astrologer Dharmadhikari H. Gangadhara Shastry, who himself contributed substantially in the above works, has stated, the Maharaja used to study each and every one of these works and discuss them with the authors.

Wadiyar also encouraged historical research on modern lines; this finds an echo in the dedication of the encyclopaedic work entitled History of Mysore by C. Hayavadana Rao published in three voluminous works published between 1943 and 1946.

==== Selected literary works by the maharaja ====
- The Quest for Peace: an Indian Approach, University of Minnesota, Minneapolis 1959.
- Dattatreya: The Way & The Goal, Allen & Unwin, London 1957.
- The Gita and Indian Culture, Orient Longmans, Bombay, 1963.
- Religion And Man, Orient Longmans, Bombay, 1965 (based on Prof. Ranade Series Lectures organised at Karnataka University in 1961)
- Avadhuta: Reason & Reverence, Indian Institute of World Culture, Bangalore, 1958.
- An Aspect of Indian Aesthetics, University of Madras, 1956.
- Puranas As The Vehicles of India's Philosophy of History, Journal Purana, issue #5, 1963.
- Advaita Philosophy, Sringeri Souvenir Volume, 1965, pages 62–64.
- Sri Suresvaracharya, Sringeri Souvenir Volume, Srirangam, 1970, pages 1–8.
- Kundalini Yoga, (a review of "Serpent Power" by Sir John Woodroff)
- Note on Ecological Surveys to precede Large Irrigation Projects- Wesley Press, Mysore; 1955
- African Survey; The Bangalore Press; 1955
- The Virtuous Way of Life – Mountain Path – July 1964 edition+23
- Aesthetic Philosophy of India – To be Published in 2024 by the Maharaja Shri Jayachamaraja Wadiyar Foundation!

=== Music ===
Wadiyar was a connoisseur of both Western and Carnatic classical music. As well as composing music himself, he also patronised numerous musicians in his court as well as international artists and became involved in acclaimed music organisations.

==== Western classical music ====
Wadiyar became a Licentiate of the Guildhall School of Music, London and honorary Fellow of Trinity College of Music, London, in 1945. Aspirations to become a concert pianist were cut short by the untimely deaths of his father in 1939 and his reigning uncle in 1940, when he had to succeeded to the throne.

Wadiyar became the first president of the Philharmonia Concert Society in 1948. During his presidency, he founded the Medtner Society at London in 1948 in honour of the Russian composer Nikolai Medtner. The maharaja also financed the recording of a large number of Medtner's compositions. Medtner dedicated his third piano concerto to the maharaja. Maharaja wrote a personal letter on 20 October 1948 in which he said:

I want particularly to let you know what real and genuine pleasure it has given me to listen to your glorious third piano concerto which it is my unique honour of having it dedicated to me. You will allow me to say that I consider your third concerto is possibly the greatest contribution made to the literature of the piano during the last half a century. I say so not because it happens to be dedicated to me, not because many other musicians and great critics have held it to be a work of the highest artistic standard, but because I as a layman have been deeply moved by its great spiritual feeling, its undertone of tragedy and sublimating all our "elan-vital" - like a Promethean will of victory over the darkness of our immediate horizons...

Again on 28 Sept 1951 he wrote to his manager, Capt. Binstead: "Medtner is really a very remarkable man, amazing to the doctors themselves. His determination is as great as his talents. It is really a matter for admiration that Mr. Medtner has been able to finish the two songs, even at the time when he was on the verge of collapse. Really, God will grant him sufficient strength andhealth to be of immense service to the musical world - of which there is a real and great need at the present moment.."

Medtner succumbed to his illness soon thereafter on 13 November 1951 and Maharaja cabled his wife thus: Nicholos great music will be immortal and that his name will live and shine as lustrous star is my firm conviction" !

Walter Legge, who was the record producer in these efforts, stated:

The visit to Mysore was a fantastic experience. The Maharajah was a young man, not yet thirty. In one of his palaces he had a record library containing every imaginable recordings of serious music, a large range of loud speakers, and several concert grand pianos... In the weeks I stayed there, the Maharajah agreed to paying for the recordings of the Medtner piano concertos, an album of his songs, and some of his chamber music; he also agreed to give me a subvention of 10,000 pounds a year for three years to enable me to put the Philharmonia Orchestra and the Philharmonia Concert Society on firm basis...

A programme schedule during the maharaja's presidency of the Philharmonia Concert Society

This largesse proved sufficient to transform Legge's fortunes in 1949; he was able to engage Herbert von Karajan as conductor. The repertory the maharajah wished to sponsor were Balakirev's Symphony, Roussel's Fourth Symphony, Busoni's Indian Fantasy, etc. The association produced some of the most memorable recordings of the post-war period.

In 1950, Wadiyar sponsored an evening orchestra event at the Royal Albert Hall by the Philharmonia Concert Society with German conductor Wilhelm Furtwängler in the lead and soprano Kirsten Flagstad singing Four Last Songs, fulfilling Richard Strauss's last wish.

The maharaja was an equally good critic of music. When asked by Legge to pass judgement on the recent additions to the EMI catalogue, his views were as trenchant as they were refreshingly unpredictable. He was thrilled by Karajan's Vienna Philharmonic recording of Beethoven's Fifth Symphony ("as Beethoven wished it to be"), held Furtwängler's recording of the Fourth Symphony in high esteem, and was disappointed by Alceo Galliera's account of the Seventh Symphony, which he preferred Karajan had recorded. Above all, he expressed serious doubts about Arturo Toscanini's recordings. "The speed and energy are those of a demon", he wrote to Legge, "not an angel or superman as one would ardently hope for". One of the reasons he so admired Furtwängler's Beethoven was that it was "such a tonic after Toscanini's highly strung, vicious performances".

In the July 1950 edition of Gramophone, Legge writes:

... Many more correspondent have written expressing their admiration for the vision, constructive enterprise, and generosity of the young Indian Prince who conceived this plan, and who is making it possible for the music lovers throughout the world to learn, enjoy and study works which but for his knowledge and love of music, would never have been recorded...

==== Carnatic classical music ====
After becoming Maharaja, he became increasingly exposed to Carnatic classical music owing to the cultural vibrancy which prevailed in the Mysore court. He learnt to play veena under Vid. Venkatagiriappa; he eventually mastered the nuances of Carnatic music under the tutelage of the veteran composer and courtier Vid. Vasudevachar. The maharaja composed as many as 94 Carnatic music works under the assumed name Shri Vidya. All his compositions are in different ragas and some of them for the first time ever. He is credited with the creation of the raga Jayasamvardini. These compositions were published as a book in 2010 by R. Raja Chandra, his son-in-law, as "Sree Vidyaa Gaana Vaaridhi", edited by S. Krishna Murthy, Vid. Vasudevachar's grandson. A total of 94 of his compositions are supposed to be available in print. 93 are available in the website given below: http://www.carnatica.net/lyrics/jclist.pdf

During these compositions, Wadiyar built three temples in Mysore city: Bhuvaneshvari Temple and Gayatri Temple, located inside the Mysore Palace Fort, and Sri Kamakaameshwari Temple, situated on Ramanuja Road, Mysore, all sculpted by his guru Siddalingaswamy.

Many noted Indian musicians received patronage at his court, including Mysore Vasudevachar, Veena Venkatagiriyappa, B. Devendrappa, V. Doraiswamy Iyengar, T. Chowdiah, Tiger Vardachar, Chennakeshaviah, Titte Krishna Iyengar, S. N. Mariappa, Chintalapalli Ramachandra Rao, R. N. Doreswamy, H. M. Vaidyalinga Bhagavatar. V. Ramarathnam, a veteran musician and scholar, authored the "Contribution and Patronage of Wadiyars to Music", a book that delves deep into the patronage and contribution of Wadiyars to Carnatic music.

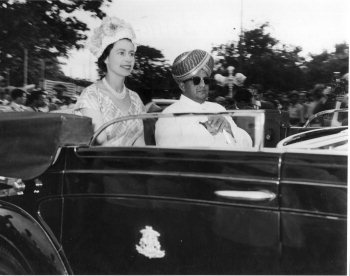
The Maharaja with Queen Elizabeth II at Mysore

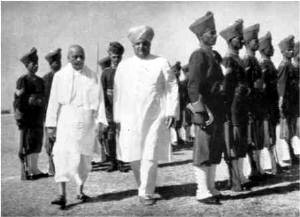
The Maharaja with the Minister of Home Affairs Sardar Vallabh Patel

== Death ==
Jayachamaraja Wadiyar died at the age of 55 on 23 September 1974 at his Bangalore Palace; he was the last living person who had been the premier king of a state with a 21-gun salute status in British India. He was succeeded by his son Srikantadatta Narasimharaja Wadiyar as the head of the Royal Family and the ceremonial maharaja of Mysore.

== Family ==
Jayachamaraja Wadiyar married Maharani Sathya Prema Kumari of Jigni province on 15 May 1938. The marriage failed; the maharani returned to and settled at Jaipur. They had a daughter who they named Prema. Prema ended up residing in Bangalore, where she married Neelakanta Venkata Krishna Iyer and had three children with him. She died on 18 April 2021.

On 6 May 1942, two years into his accession as maharaja, Jayachamaraja Wadiyar married Maharani Tripura Sundari Devi. The couple has six children: Maharajakumari Gayatri Devi (1946–1974), who predeceased her father due to cancer; Rajakumari Meenakshi Devi (1951–2015); Yuvaraja Srikantadatta Narasimharaja Wadiyar (1953–2013); Rajakumari Kamakshi Devi (b.1954); Rajakumari Indrakshi Devi (b.1956); and Rajakumari Vishalakshi Devi Avaru (1962–2018).

Both the queens died in 1982 within a span of 15 days.

A public wedding pamphlet of Prince Jayachamaraja Wadiyar to his first wife Sathya Prema Kumari Devi

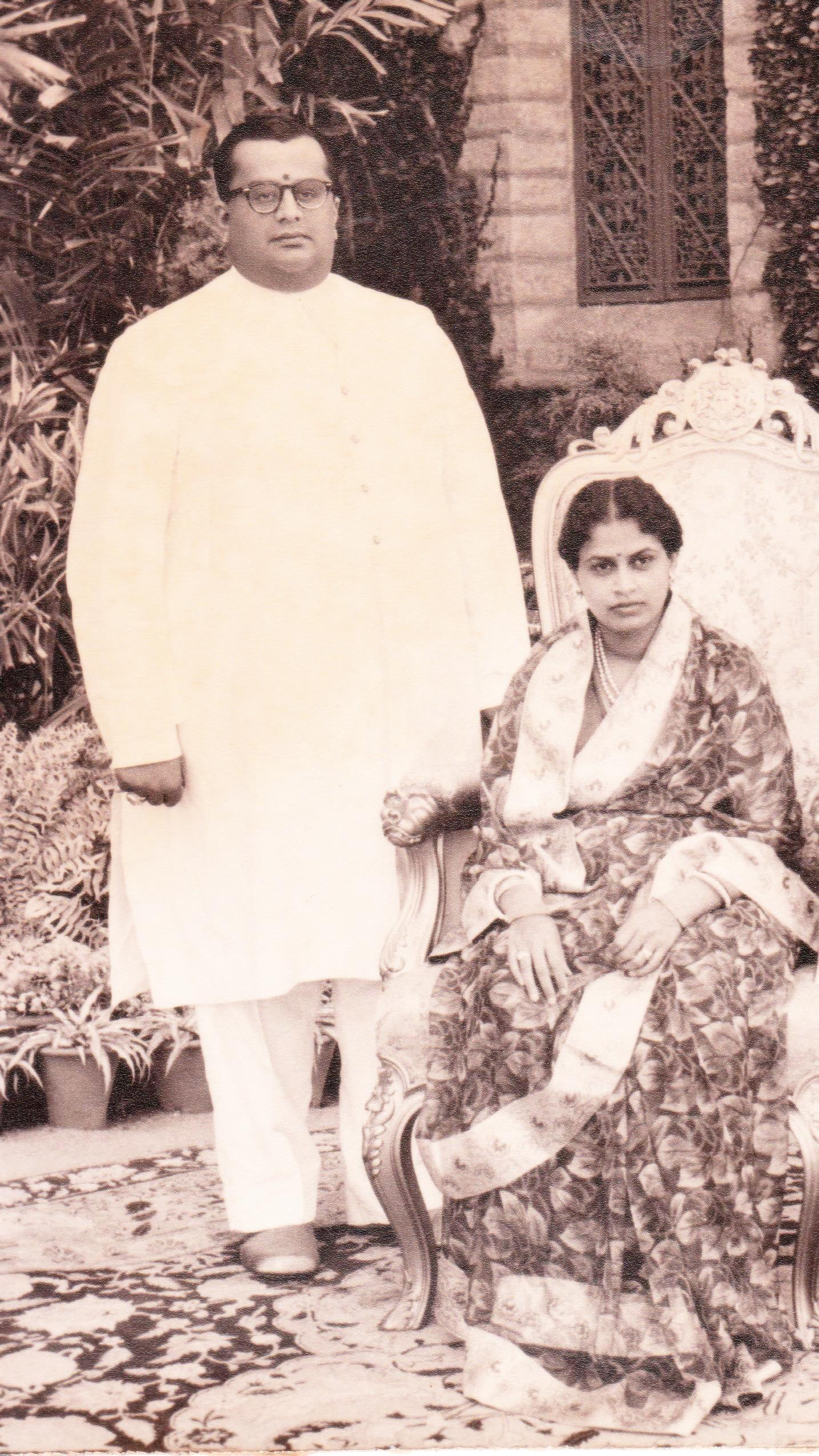
The Maharaja with his queen consort Tripura Sundari Ammani

== Honours ==
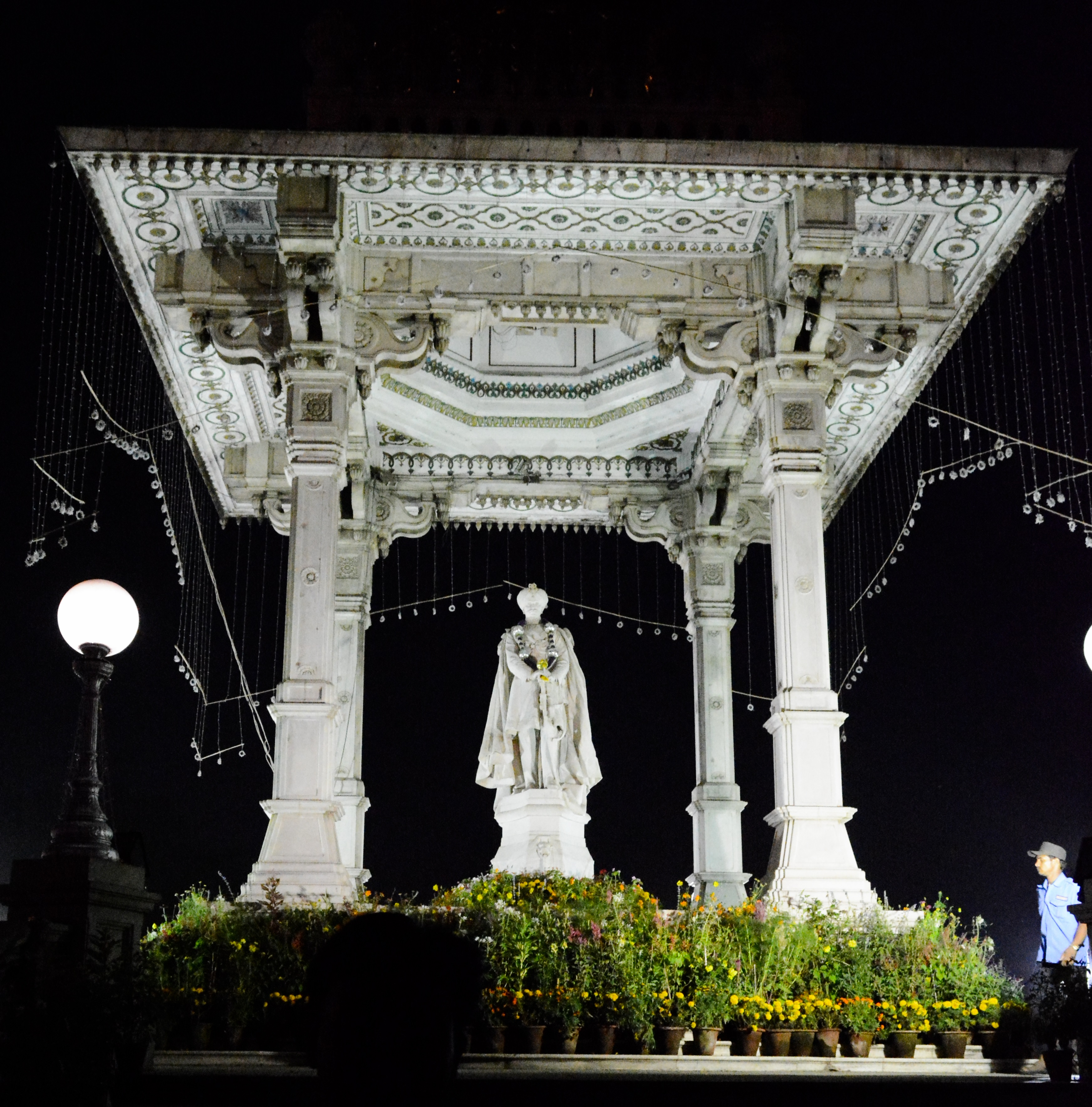
Jayachamarajendra Circle at Mysore

- Knight Grand Cross of the Most Honourable Order of the Bath (GCB) in 1946
- Knight Grand Commander of the Most Exalted Order of the Star of India (GCSI), 1945

=== Fellowships and memberships ===
- Fellow and president of the National Academy of Music, Dance and Drama, New Delhi, 1966
- First chairman of the Indian Wildlife Board

=== Honorary doctorates ===
- Doctor of Literature from the University of Queensland, Australia.
- Doctor of Literature from Annamalai University, Tamil Nadu.
- Doctor of Law from Banaras Hindu University
- Doctor of Laws, honoris causa from the University of Mysore, 1962

=== Memorials ===
- Hardinge Circle at Mysore was renamed Jayachamaraja Circle with the maharaja's life-size statue
- Jayanagar, Mysore, Jayanagar, Bangalore, and Jayachamaraja Road, Bangalore, are named in the maharaja's honour
- Jaganmohana Palace at Mysore was renamed Sri Jayachamarajendra Art Gallery in his memory

Jayachamarajendra Wadiyar Wodeyar dynasty Born: 1919 Died: 1974
Regnal titles
Preceded by Krishna Raja Wadiyar IV (as Raja of Mysore)	Maharaja of Mysore; 1940–1950	Succeeded by Monarchy abolished (Merged with the Republic of India)
Political offices
Preceded by None; post created 26 January 1950	Rajpramukh of the State of Mysore; 1950–1956	Succeeded by Post abolished Abolished by the Government of India 31 October 1956
Preceded by None; post created 31 October 1956, following the abolition of the position of Rajpramukh	Governor of Mysore State; 1956–1964	Succeeded by S.M. Sriganesh
Preceded by Bhishnuram Medhi	Governor of Madras State; 1964–1966	Succeeded by Ujjal Singh
Titles in pretence
Preceded by None	— TITULAR — Maharaja of Mysore; 1950–1974	Succeeded by Srikanta Datta Narsimharaja Wodeyar
