= Akbar Mirza Khaleeli =

Indian diplomat

Akbar Mirza Khaleeli (born 1936) is a retired Indian diplomat who served as the Indian ambassador to Iran, Italy and High Commissioner to Australia with concurrent accreditation to Vanuatu and Solomon Islands.

== Early life and education ==
Akbar Khaleeli was born in 1936 in Bengaluru (Bangalore). He was educated at Bishop Cotton Boys' School, Bengaluru and Doveton Corrie Boys' High School, Chennai before completing BA (Honours) in Economics from Loyola College, Chennai and Bachelor of Law from Madras Law College, Chennai.

He married his maternal first cousin Shakereh Khaleeli in 1965 with whom he has four daughters including Rehane Yavar Dhala.

== Diplomatic career ==
Akbar Khaleeli entered the Indian foreign service in 1959. He had served various posts in Delhi, Baghdad, Colombo, Paris and Amman before taking the position of Chief of Protocol in the Ministry of External Affairs in 1976, the Indian ambassador to Iran from 1980-84, Italy from 1986-90 and High Commissioner to Australia with concurrent accreditation to Vanuatu and Solomon Islands from 1991-95. He was also a permanent representative of India to the Food and Agricultural Organisation, Rome.

During his career in the Ministry of External Affairs from 1959 to 1995, he held multiple posts including Chief of Protocol, Joint Secretary Haj, Director West Asia and North Africa and charges d'affairs.

== See also ==
- Shakereh Khaleeli
