= Tushar Lall =

Indian Composer, Producer and YouTuber

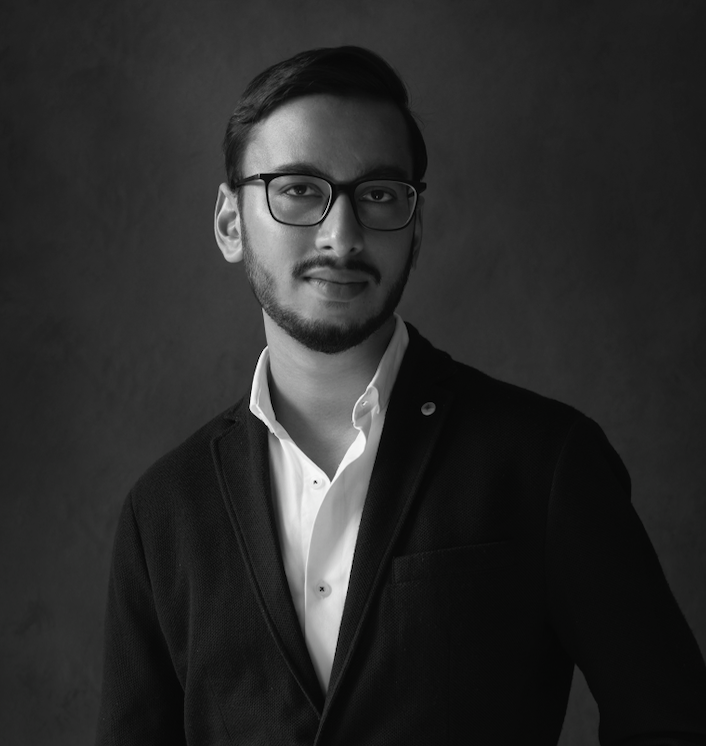
- Born: 1 December 1994 (age 31); Mumbai, India
- Education: B.A. in Music Production, Dubspot
- Occupations: Composer, Producer, YouTuber
- Years active: 2014-
- Known for: Music Composition, YouTube Channel, The Indian Jam Project
- Notable work: Curry and Cyanide, Dancing on the Grave, Brahmāstra: Part One – Shiva, The Sound of 007, In Bloom

Tushar Lall (/ˈtʌʃɑːr lɑːl/, born 2 December 1994 in Mumbai) is an Indian composer and producer, renowned for his innovative fusion of Hindustani classical and Western classical elements, creating a unique and captivating hybrid musical style. Tushar was a music producer on India's magnum opus - Brahmastra and has been featured in the official Bond Music Documentary alongside legends like Hans Zimmer and Billie Eilish. As a music composer, he has recently scored Netflix and Dharma's recent romcom - 'Naadaniyan', Netflix's globally trending 'Curry and Cyanide' and Amazon's murder documentary series called 'Dancing on the Grave'. He is also a famous YouTuber who specialises in stylised Indian classical covers of popular music and soundtracks, mostly released on his eponymous YouTube channel. Under the name of the Indian Jam Project, Lall has collaborated with several Indian musicians playing unique Indian instruments, such as the sarod, sarangi, and sitar.

Lall's style and composition have been appreciated by several artists, including Michael Price, Mark Hamill and Dan Reynolds for his arrangements of the Sherlock theme, the Pirates of the Caribbean theme, and the Star Wars theme. Since 2022, Lall has been involved in scoring and composing original soundtracks for several film and television productions for Netflix, Amazon Prime and Paramount Plus.

== Filmography ==
Year	Title	Director(s)	Studio(s)	Credits
2022	Brahmāstra: Part One – Shiva	Ayan Mukerji	Dharma Productions; Starlight Pictures; Prime Focus; Star Studios	Music Producer/Indian Instruments Orchestration
2022	The Sound of 007	Mat Whitecross	Amazon Studios	Music performer
2023	Dancing on the Grave	Patrick Graham	India Today Originals	Composer
2023	Sergeant	Prawaal Raman	Jar Pictures; Jio Studios	Composer
2023	Ishqyapa	Sandeep A. Verma	Amazon Mini	Composer
2024	Curry and Cyanide	Christo Tomy	Netflix	Composer
2024	In Bloom	Priyanka Banerjee	Paramount+	Composer
2025	Nadaaniyan	Shauna Gautam	Netflix	Composer
