= M. Kantharaj Urs Road =

Road in Mysore city

Coordinates: 12.299833723587092°N 76.6348880750656°E

M. Kantharaj Urs Road is a road in Mysore, Karnataka, India.

== Location ==
The road starts at K. G. Koppal and terminates near Kukkarahalli Lake Tank Bund Road over M. B. Padma Circle covering the localities of K. G. Koppal and Saraswathipuram. Enroute this hosts the NCC Mysore headquarters, and the house of Dr. Sarvepalli Radhakrishnan, who resided while working as a Professor in University of Mysore. TTL College, Muslim Hostel complex, Fire Brigade, Govt Text Book Press, University Engineering Division can be located en route.

== See also ==
- New Kantharaj Urs Road
- Devaraj Urs Road, Mysore
