= Jayachamarajendra Circle =

Coordinates: 12.307065°N 76.660200°E

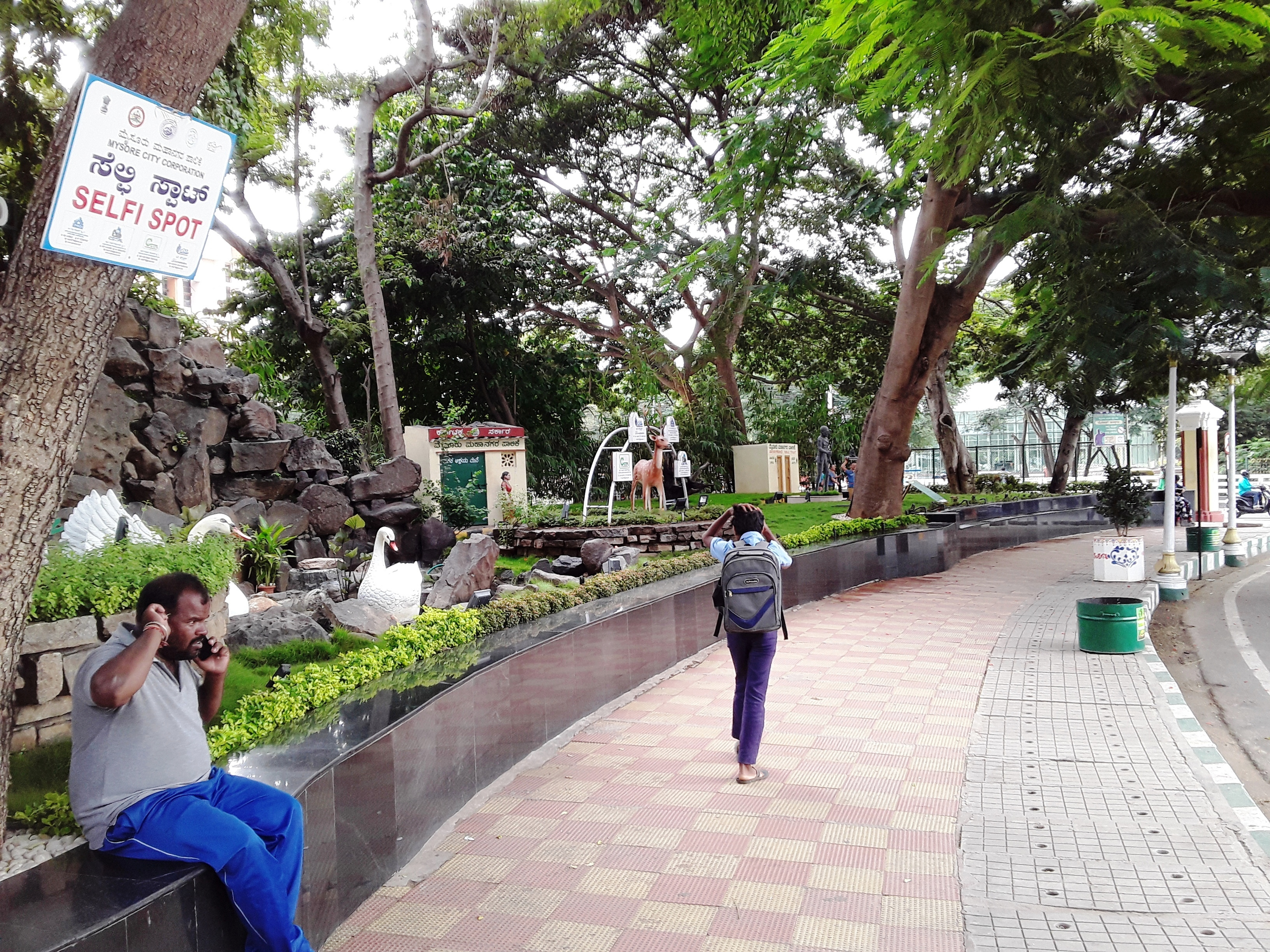
Selfie Spot

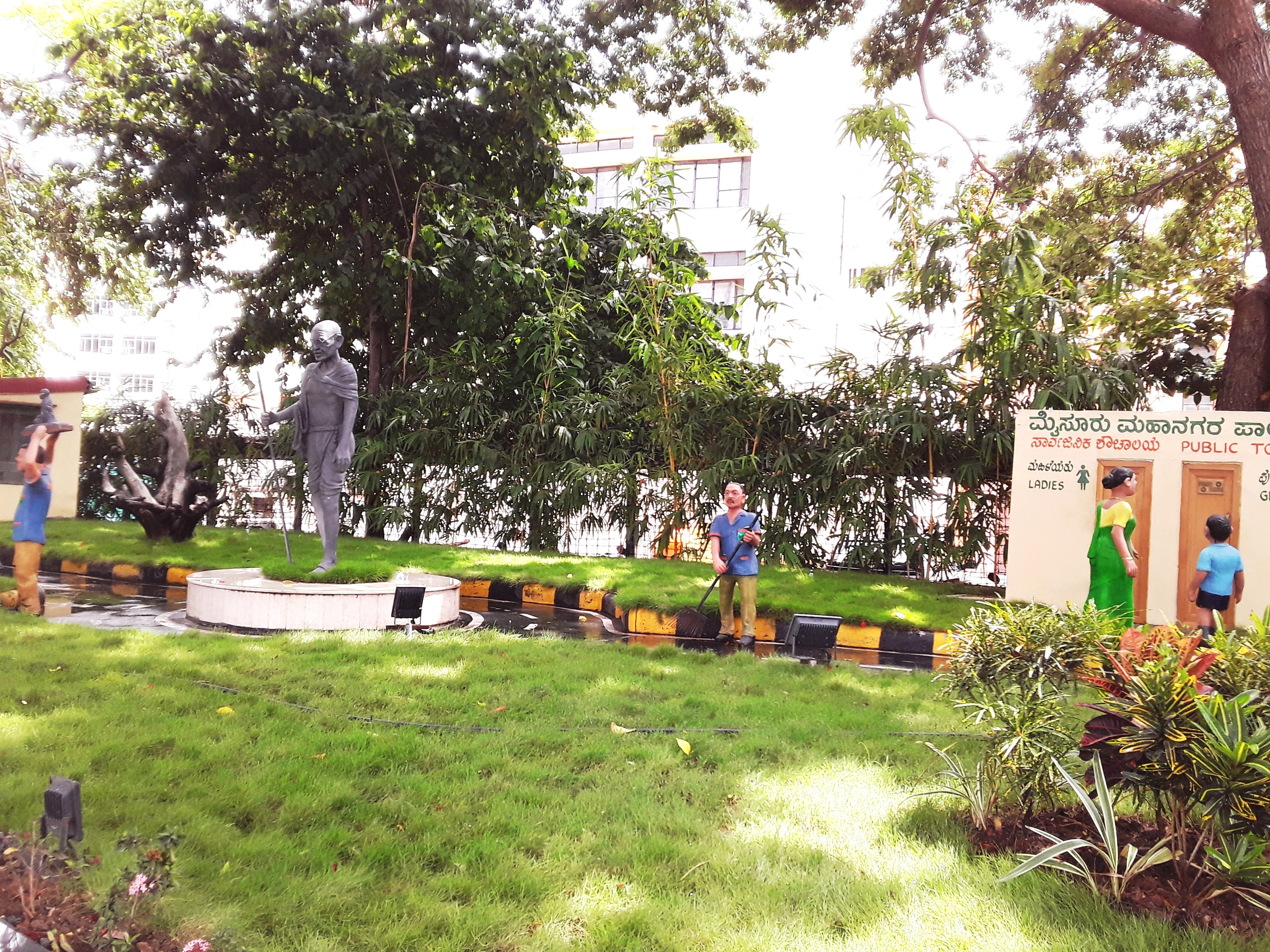
Hardings Circle garden

Jayachamarajendra Circle or Jayachamarajendra Wadiyar Circle, formerly known as Harding Circle or Arugatu is an intersection of six major roads in Mysore, Karnataka state, India.

== Etymology ==
The circle was originally called Hardinge Circle (named after Lord Charles Hardinge, 1st Baron Hardinge of Penshurst who served as Viceroy and Governor-General of India from 1910 to 1916. https://timesofindia.indiatimes.com/travel/mysore/royal-and-heritage-circles/ps51223443.cms#:~:text=Hardinge%20Circle%20was%20built%20to,and%20piers%20decorated%20with%20flowers.). The locals preferred to call it Aru Gate because six streets converged in the circle leading to six main roads of the city.

The western road leading to the Mysore Palace and city bus station is called the Albert Victor Road. The two northern roads are called Bangalore Nilgiri Road as they are both one-way-twins leading to Bangalore. The southern road is called Nilgiri Road which goes to Ooty. The eastern road is called Mirza Road and it goes to Postal Training Center in Nazrabad. The southeastern road is called Lokarjan Mahal road and it goes to the Mysore Zoo and Karanji Lake.

== Statue ==
In 2016, a lifesize statue of Sri Jayachamarajendra Wadiyarwas erected at this intersection. The statue was made in Indo-Saracenic architecture. The cost of construction was Rs. 5 crores. it is the third largest statue in Mysore.

The statue was unveiled by the chief minister of Karnataka in July 2016. The 28-ton statue was made by a Mysorean sculptor Arun Yogiraj shilpi.

== Image gallery ==
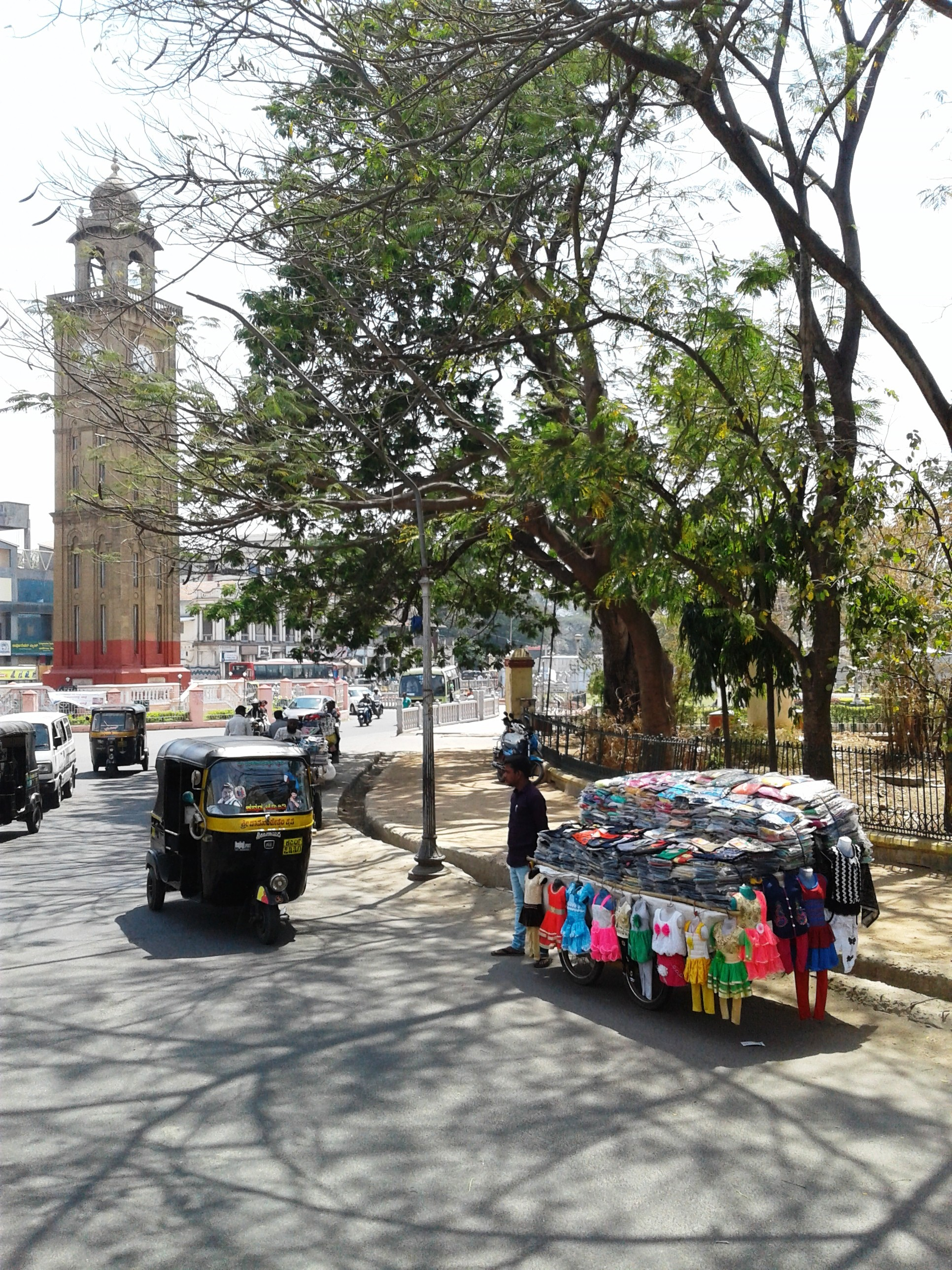
The Clock Tower

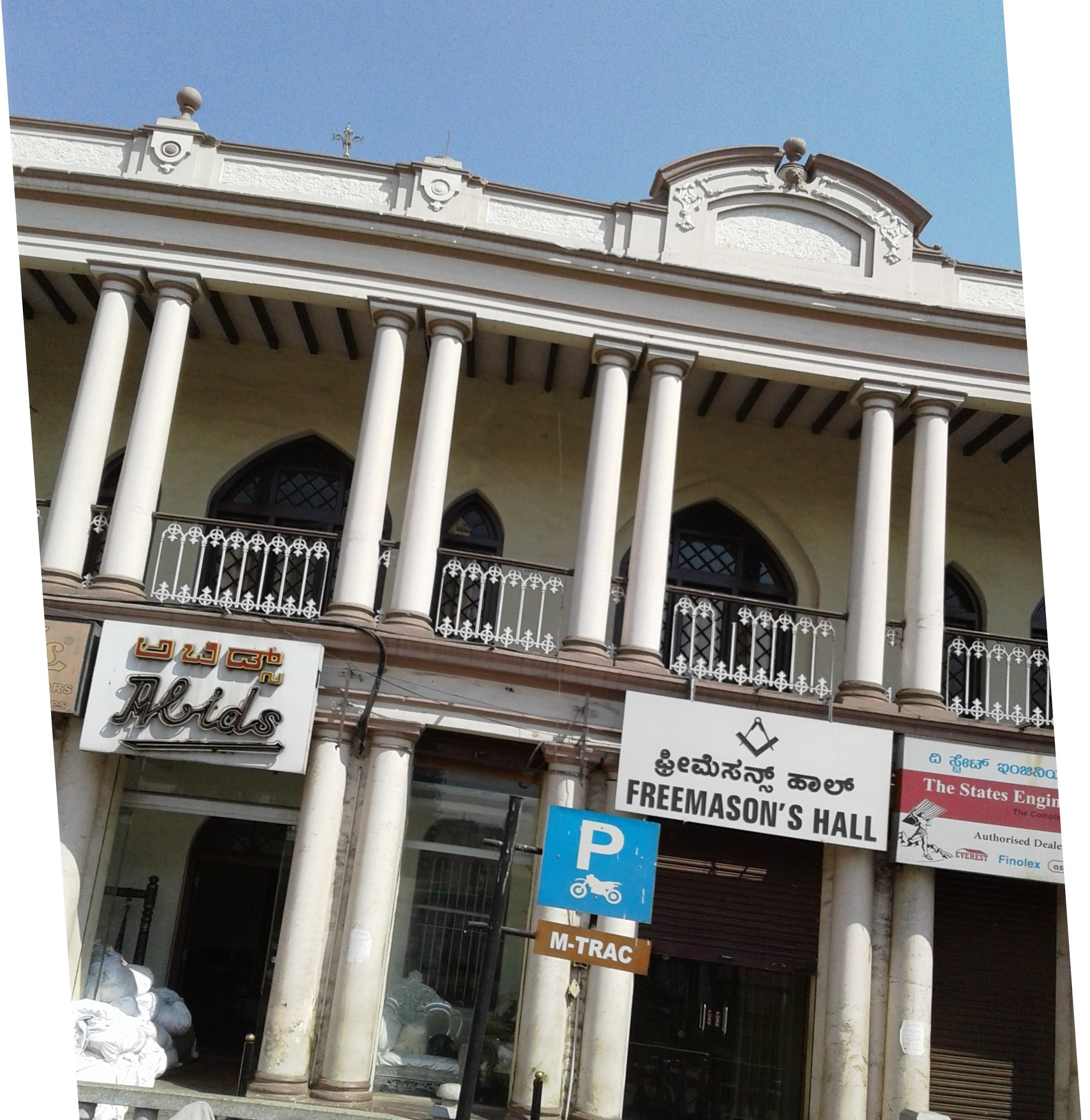
Freemason Hall

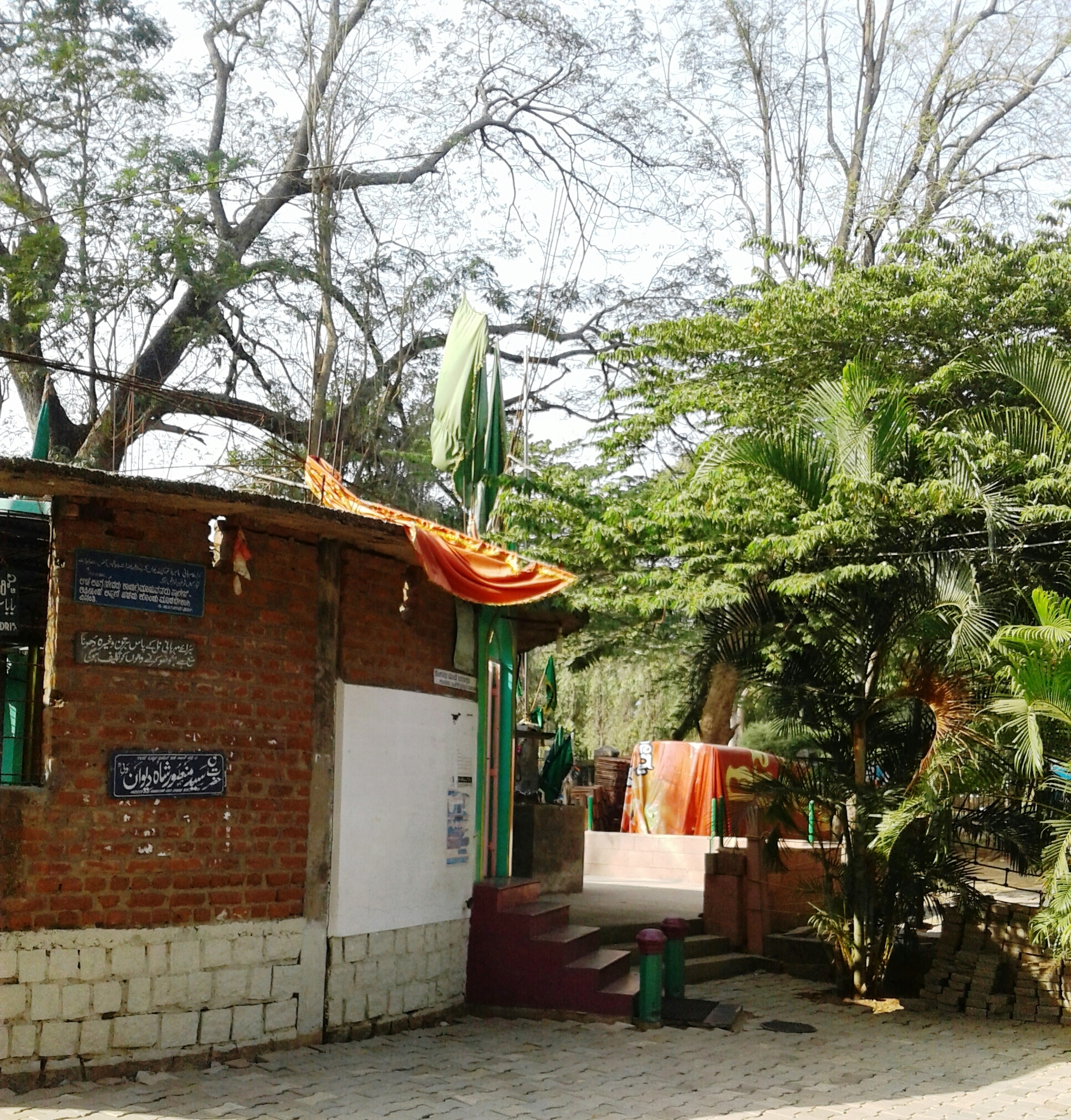
Mansoor Dargah

Harsha Street

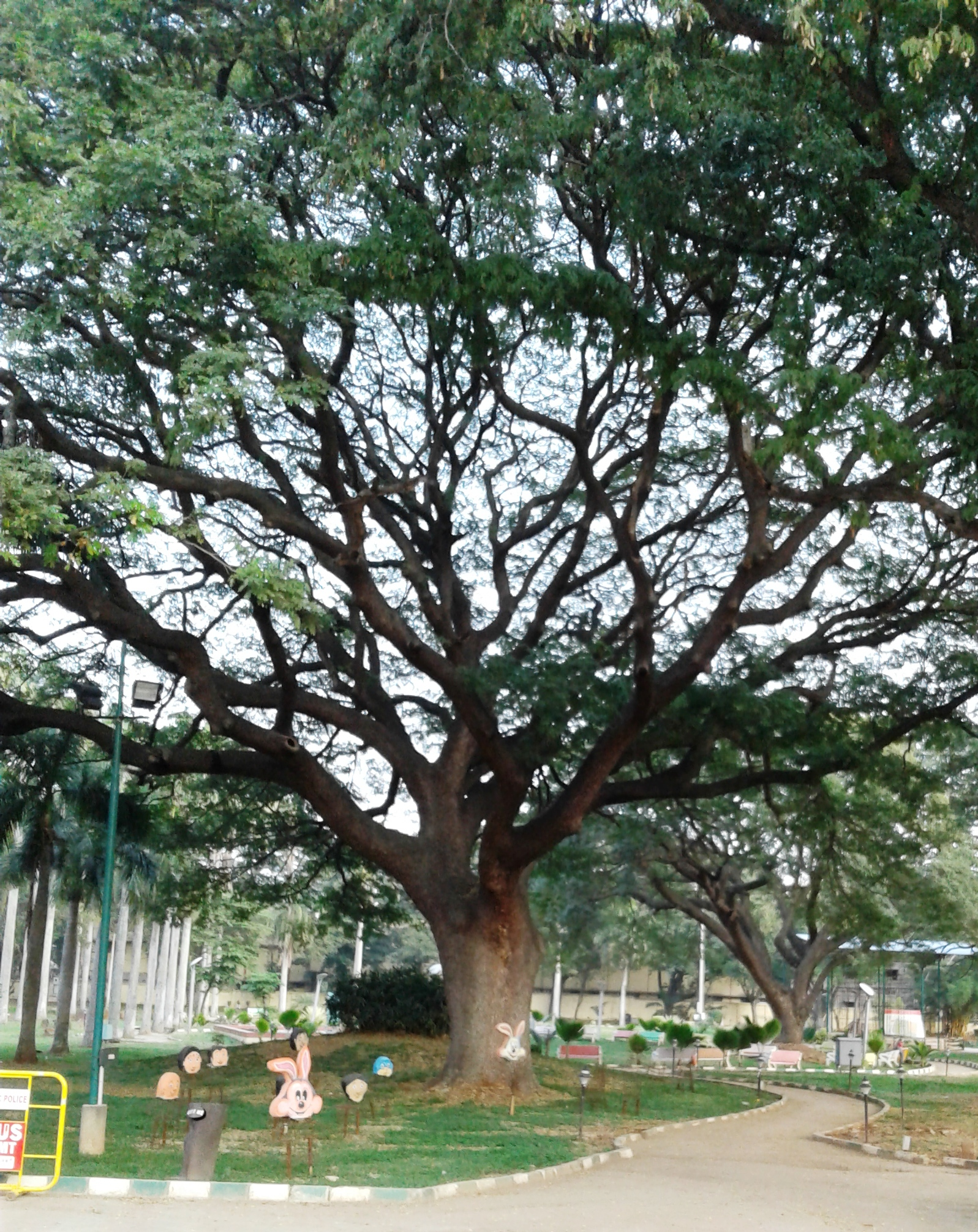
Kuppanna Park

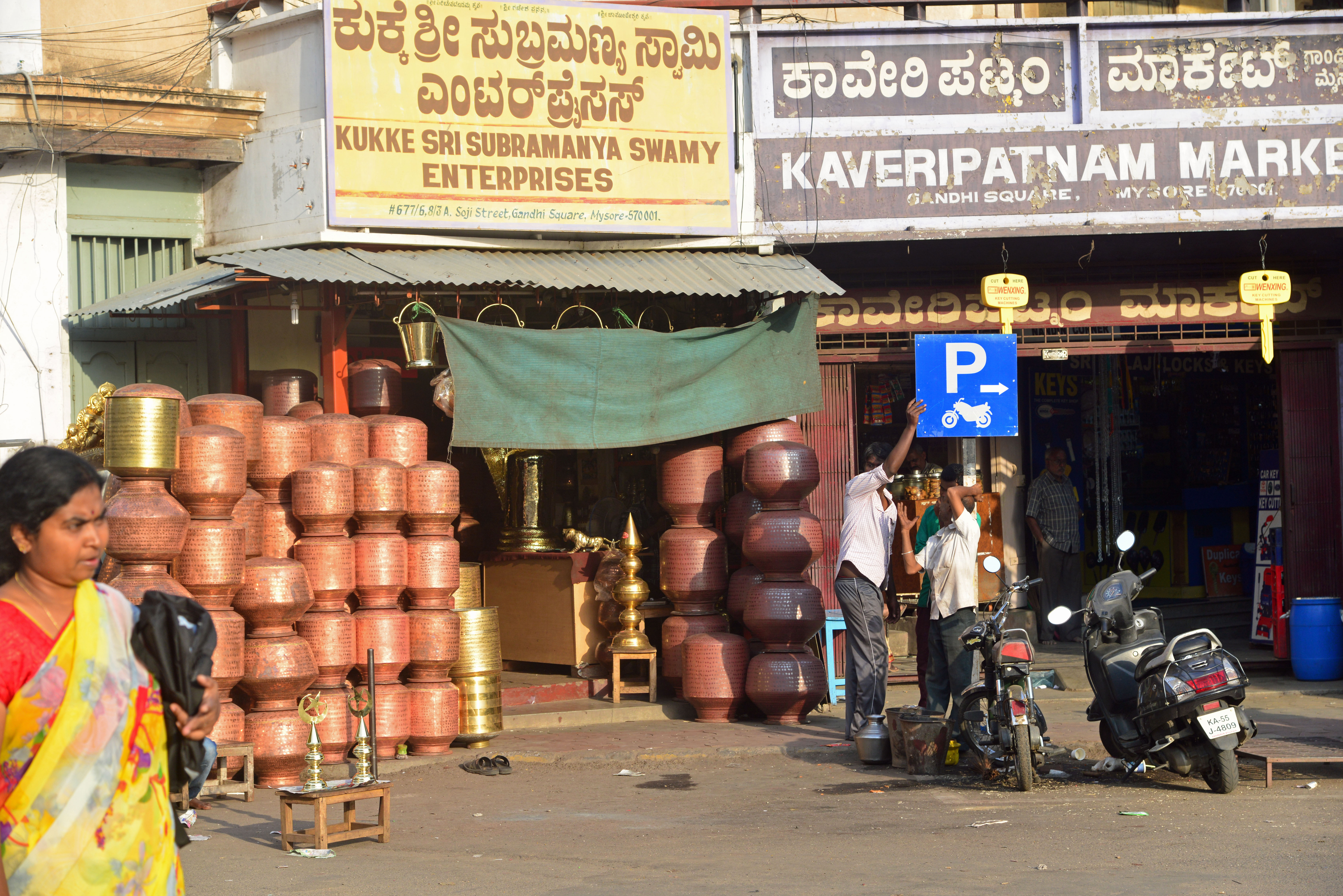
Gandhi Market

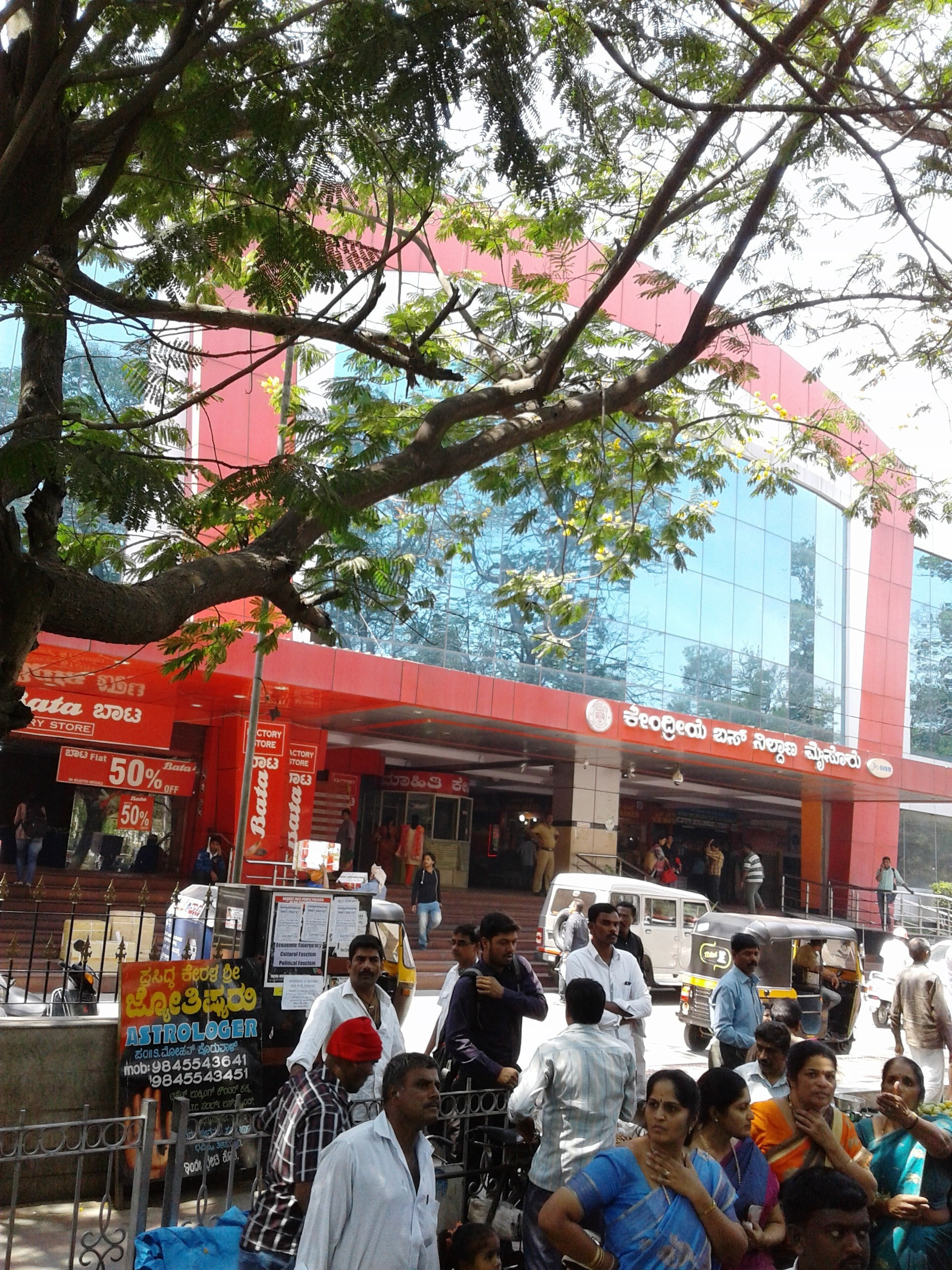
Suburban Bus Station
