= Dancing on the Grave =

Indian crime drama web series

- Genre: True crime docuseries
- Based on: Shakereh Khaleeli
- Written by: Kanishka Singh Deo; Patrick Graham
- Directed by: Patrick Graham
- Music by: Tushar Lall
- Country of origin: India
- Original language: Hindi
- No. of seasons: 1
- No. of episodes: 4

Production
- Producer: India Today Originals
- Cinematography: Harshbir Singh Phull
- Editors: Kartik Bansal; Jahaan Noble; Abhinav Tyagi
- Running time: 40 – 50 minutes

Original release
- Network: Amazon Prime Video
- Release: 21 April 2023

Dancing on the Grave is an Indian true crime docuseries released in 2023. It is based on the Shakereh Khaleeli murder case. The series is directed by Patrick Graham for Amazon Prime Video and produced by India Today.

== Cast ==
- Anup Upadhyay as Murali Manohar Mishra (Shradhananda)
- Danish Pandor as Akbar Mirza Khaleeli
- Shafaq Naaz as Shakereh
- Medha Rana as Sabah
- Jiten Jatania as Mirza Ismail
- Neeven Ved as young Shakereh
