= Siege of Adoni =

1786 siege of the Maratha-Mysore wars

- Part of the Maratha-Mysore wars
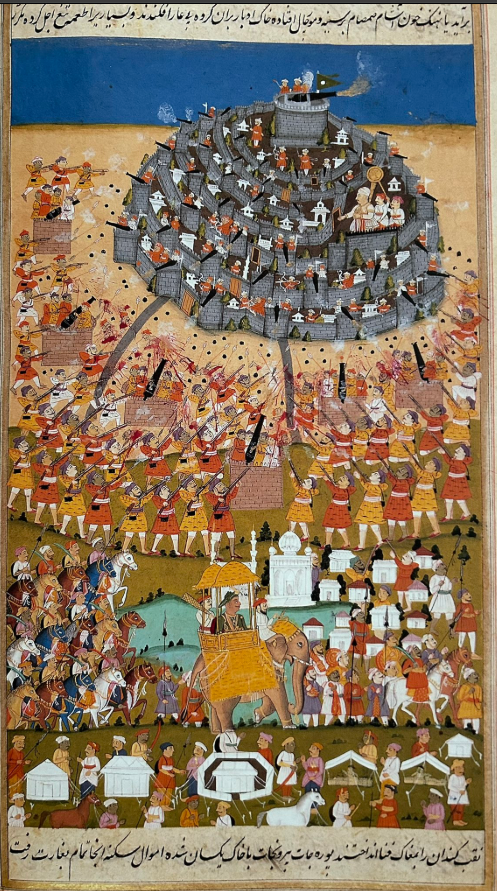
- Battle of Adoni depicted in the Tuzuk-i-Asafia c.1793
Date	1786
Location	Adoni
Result	Mysore victory
Territorial changes	Adoni annexed to Mysore

Belligerents
Maratha Confederacy; Hyderabad	Mysore

Commanders and leaders
Raghunath Rao; Hari Pant; Arastu Jah	Tipu Sultan

Strength
20,000 Marathas; 25,000 Nizam forces	~unknown~

The siege of Adoni was a military conflict that occurred between the forces of Tipu Sultan of the Kingdom of Mysore and the Maratha Confederacy allied with the Nizam of Hyderabad in 1786.

Tipu Sultan defeated the combined forces of Maratha and Hyderabad and conquered Adoni.

== Background ==
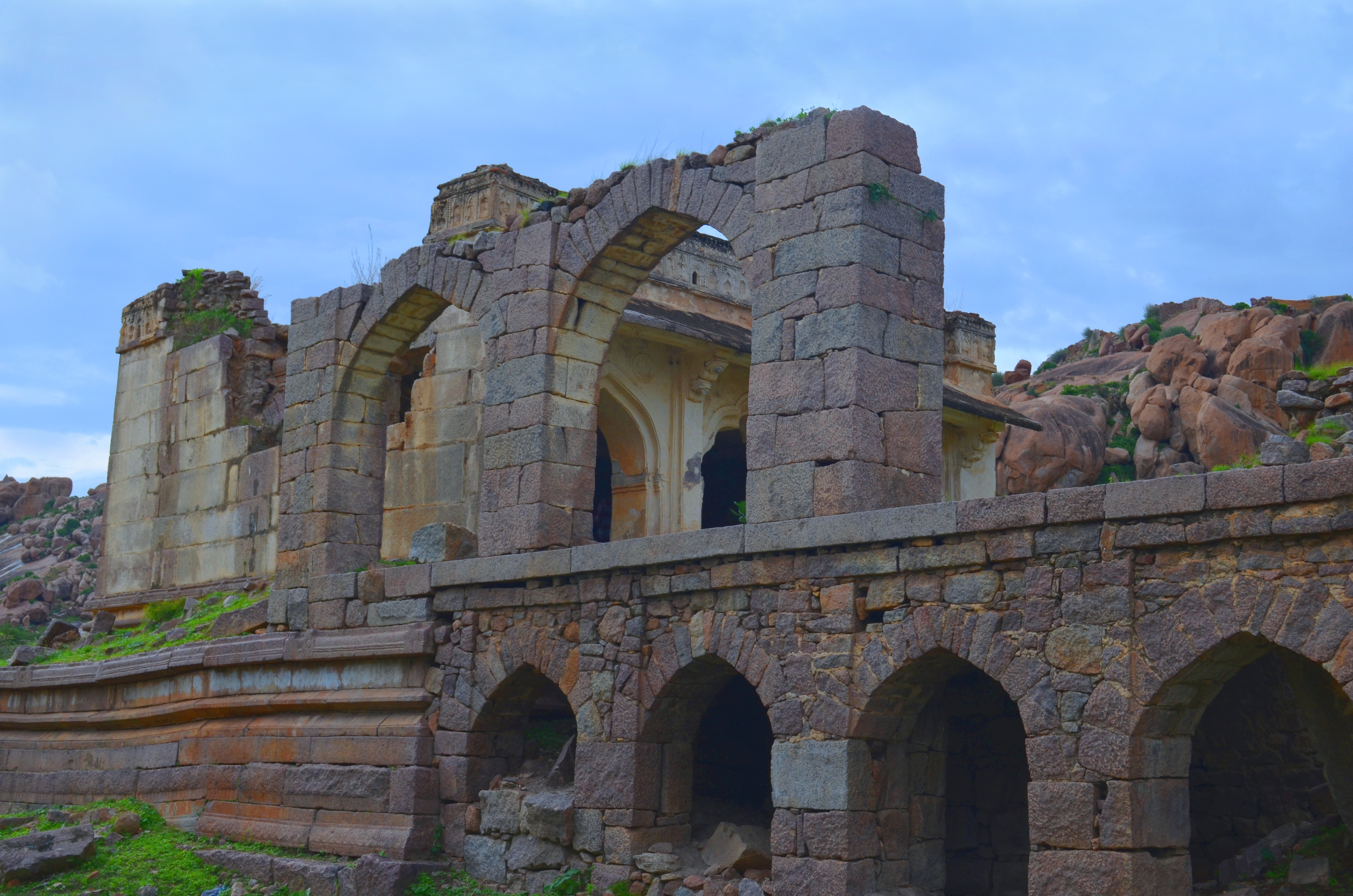
Hall of The Nawab, Adoni Fort

Adoni was a strong frontier post of the Nizam of Hyderabad, south of the Tungabhadra. Tipu Sultan attempted to capture Adoni in 1786. The fort was defended by Mahabat Jung. Mahabat Jung wrote letters to the Nizam and the Marathas for helping them against Tipu's invasion. Asad Ali Khan, his minister, was sent to persuade Tipu not to attack Adoni, and offered him a large sum of money. But Tipu rejected the offer and proceeded to attack.

Maratha forces under Haripant, Appa Bulwant, and Raghunath Rao and Nizam - Salabat Jung's forces under Mughal Ali Khan and Tahawwar Jung were sent to help Mahabat Jung after receiving the letter. The forces met at Bunnoo River and marched towards Adoni. The Maratha forces numbered 20,000 and the Nizam's forces numbered 25,000.

== Siege ==
The combined force of the Maratha and Nizam confronted Tipu Sultan's forces at Adoni fort. Both sides faced heavy casualties. After 21 days of siege, the Maratha-Nizam forces retreated from Adoni fort. Adoni was annexed to the Kingdom of Mysore.
