= Battle of Savanur =

1786 Military engagement

Date	October 1786
Location	Savanur 14°58′23″N 75°19′58″E
Result	Mysore victory

Belligerents
Kingdom of Mysore	Maratha Empire

Commanders and leaders
Tipu Sultan	Hari Pant

Strength
~Unknown~	60,000
- Location within Karnataka Battle of Savanur (India)

The Battle of Savanur occurred between the Kingdom of Mysore and Maratha Empire. The Mysore forces led by Tipu Sultan defeated the Maratha at Savanur in October 1786. The Maratha Army led by Hari Pant retreated, and the Mysore army entered Savanur.
