= Siege of Bahadur Benda =

Military conflict

Date	January 1787
Location	Bahadur Benda15°18′52″N 76°9′41″E
Result	Mysore victory
Territorial changes	Bahadur Benda captured by Mysore

Belligerents
Maratha Empire	Kingdom of Mysore

Commanders and leaders
Hari Pant	Tipu Sultan

The siege of Bahadur Benda occurred when the forces of Mysore led by Tipu Sultan besieged Bahadur fort in 1787. Tipu Sultan defeated the Maratha Army led by Hari Pant and captured the fort located in present-day Koppal district of Karnataka. It was the last military engagement between the Maratha Empire and Tipu Sultan.

== Background ==
Bahadur Benda was a fort under the Maratha Empire. Tipu Sultan, the King of Mysore, besieged and captured the fort in 1787. The Maratha forces were led by Hari Pant, a general of the Maratha Empire.

== Aftermath ==
This was the last military engagement between the Maratha Empire and Tipu Sultan.
