= Tipu Sultan =

Sultan of Mysore from 1782 to 1799

- Badshah; Nasīb-ud-Daulah; Amīr-e-Watan; Sher-e-Mysore
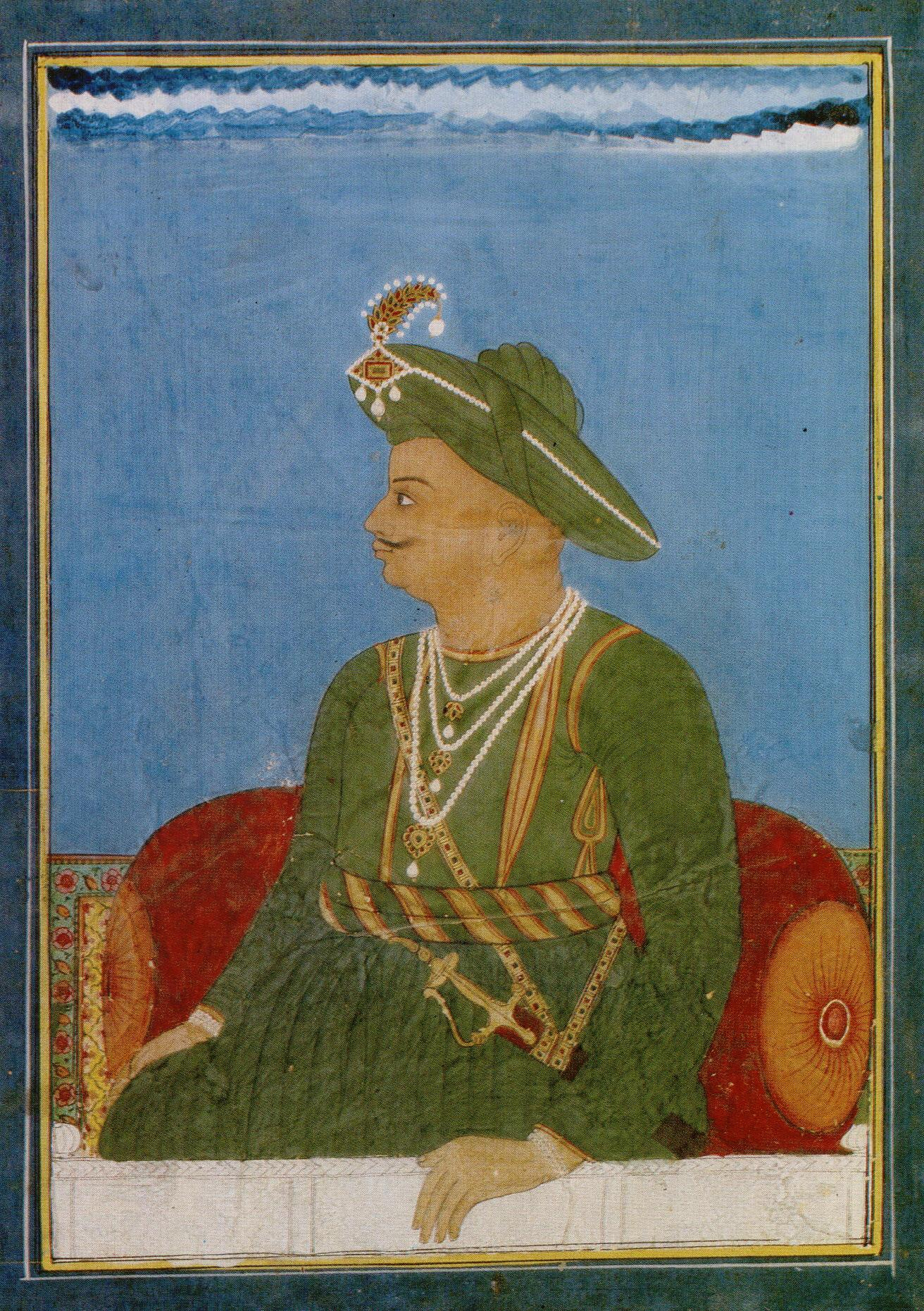
- Portrait c. 1790s

Sultan of Mysore
- Reign: 10 December 1782 – 4 May 1799
- Coronation: 29 December 1782; Seringapatam Fort
- Predecessor: Hyder Ali
- Successor: Krishnaraja III (as Maharaja of Mysore)
- Dewan: Purnaiah
- Born: Fateh Ali; 1 December 1751; Devanahalli, Kingdom of Mysore (present-day Karnataka, India)
- Died: 4 May 1799 (aged 47); Seringapatam, Sultanate of Mysore (present-day Karnataka, India)
- Burial: 5 May 1799; Gumbaz, Srirangapatna (present-day Mandya, Karnataka); 12°24′36″N 76°42′50″E
- Wife: Ruqaya Banu Begum (m. 1774); Khadija Zaman Begum (m. 1796; died 1797)
- Issue Detail: Shezada Hyder Ali; Ghulam Muhammad Sultan Sahib
Names
- Fateh Ali Sahab Tipu
Era name and dates
- Mauludi: 10 March 1784 – 4 May 1799
Regnal name
- Nawab Tipu Sultan Bahadur
Posthumous name
- Hazrat Ṭīpū Sultān Shahīd Raḥmatu -llāhi ʿAlayhū
- Dynasty: Khudadad
- Father: Hyder Ali
- Mother: Fatima Fakhr-un-Nisa
- Religion: Sunni Islam
- Seal
- Military career
- Allegiance: Sultanate of Mysore
- Branch: Mysore Army
- Service years: 1766–1799
- Rank: Sultan; Ispahsalar; Amir
- Conflicts: See list: First Anglo-Mysore War; First Anglo-Maratha War; Second Anglo-Mysore War; Pollilur (1780); Annagudi (1782); Bednore (1783); Mangalore (1783–84); Maratha-Mysore War; Moti Talab (1771); Nargund (1785); Adoni (1786); Savanur (1786); Bahadur Benda (1787); Mysorean invasion of Malabar; Third Anglo-Mysore War; Nedumkotta (1789–90); Bangalore (1791); Arakere (1791); Coimbatore (1791); Nundydroog (1791); Savendroog (1791); Seringapatam (1792); Fourth Anglo-Mysore War; Seedaseer (1799); Sultanpet Tope (1799); Seringapatam (1799) †

Tipu Sultan (Urdu: [ʈiːpuː sʊlt̪aːn], Kannada: [ʈipːu sult̪aːn], Sultan Fateh Ali Sahab Tipu; 1 December 1751 – 4 May 1799), commonly referred to as Sher-e-Mysore (Tiger of Mysore), was the Sultan of Mysore from 1782 until his death in 1799. He was a pioneer of rocket artillery. He expanded the iron-cased Mysorean rockets and commissioned the military manual Fathul Mujahidin. The economy of Mysore reached a zenith during his reign. He deployed rockets against advances of British forces and their allies during the Anglo-Mysore Wars, including the Battle of Pollilur and Siege of Srirangapatna.

Tipu Sultan and his father Hyder Ali used their French-trained army in alliance with the French in their struggle with the British, and in Mysore's struggles with other surrounding powers: against the Marathas, Sira, and rulers of Malabar, Kodagu, Bednore, Carnatic, and Travancore. Tipu became the ruler of Mysore upon his father's death from cancer in 1782 during the Second Anglo-Mysore War. He negotiated with the British in 1784 with the Treaty of Mangalore which ended the war in status quo ante bellum.

Tipu's conflicts with his neighbours included the Maratha–Mysore War, which ended with the signing of the Treaty of Gajendragad.

Tipu remained an enemy of the British East India Company. He initiated an attack on British-allied Travancore in 1789. In the Third Anglo-Mysore War, he was forced into the Treaty of Seringapatam, losing a number of previously conquered territories, including Malabar and Mangalore. In the Fourth Anglo-Mysore War, a combined force of British East India Company troops supported by the Marathas and the Nizam of Hyderabad defeated Tipu. He was killed on 4 May 1799 while defending his stronghold of Seringapatam.

Tipu also introduced administrative innovations during his rule, including a new coinage system and calendar, and a new land revenue system, which initiated the growth of the Mysore silk industry. He is known for his patronage to Channapatna toys.

== Early years ==
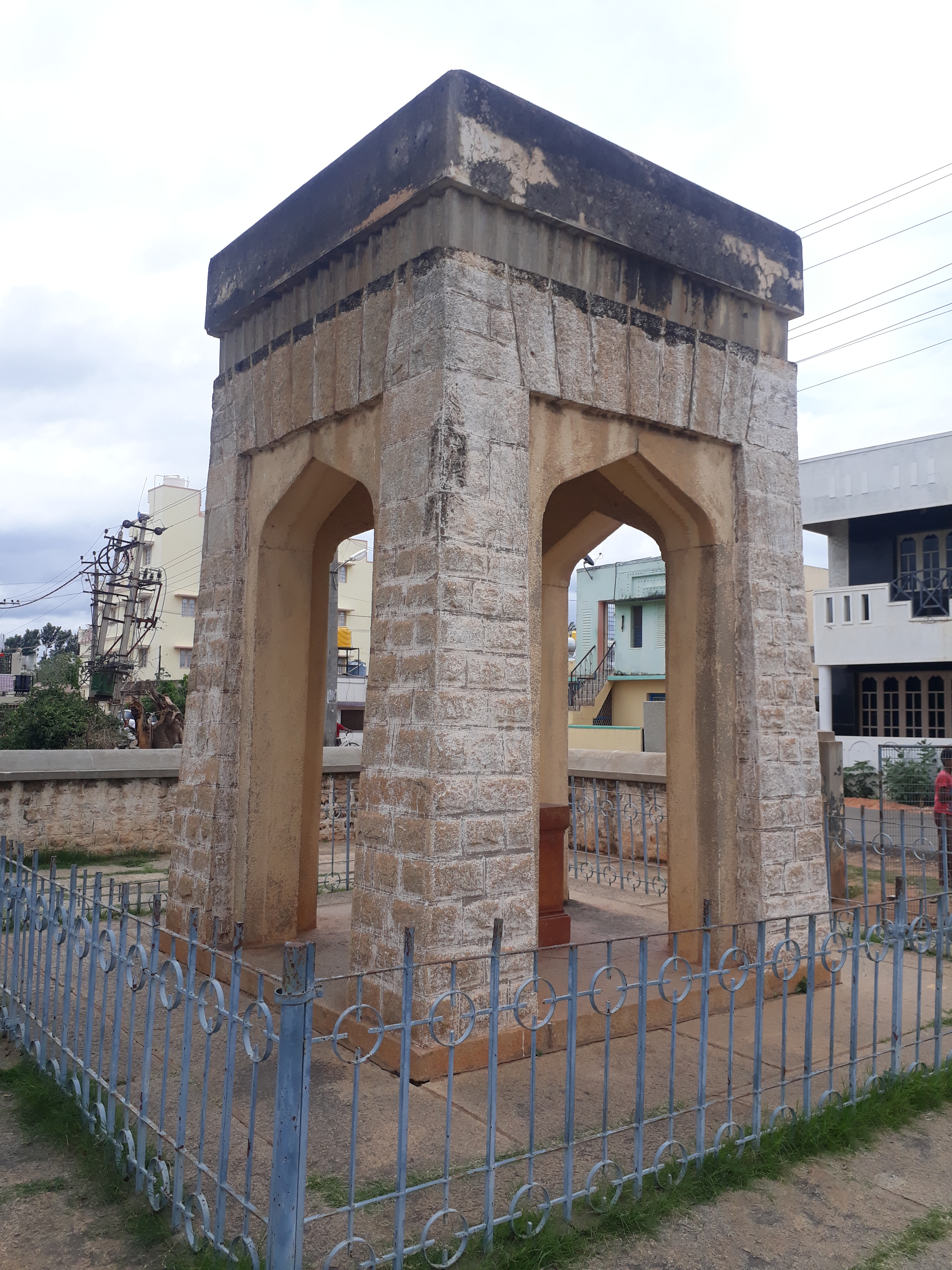
The birth place of Tipu Sultan at Devanahalli

=== Childhood ===
Tipu Sultan was born into a Muslim family in Devanahalli, in present-day Bangalore Rural district, about 33 km (21 mi) north of Bangalore on 1 December 1751. He was named "Tipu Sultan" after the saint Tipu Mastan Aulia of Arcot. Being illiterate, Tipu's father Hyder Ali was very particular in giving his eldest son a religious education and a very early exposure to military and political affairs. At the age of 17 and onwards, Tipu was given charge of diplomatic and military missions and supported his father in his wars.

Tipu's father, Hyder Ali, was a military officer in service to the Kingdom of Mysore who had become the de facto ruler of Mysore in 1761 while his mother Fatima Fakhr-un-Nisa was the daughter of Mir Muin-ud-Din, the governor of the fort of Kadapa. Hyder Ali appointed able teachers to give Tipu an early education in subjects like Urdu, Persian, Arabic, Kannada, Beary, Quran, Islamic jurisprudence, riding, shooting and fencing.

=== Language ===
Tipu Sultan's mother tongue was Urdu. The French noted that "Their language is Moorish (Urdu) but they also speak Persian." Moors at the time was a European designation for Urdu: "I have a deep knowledge [je possède à fond] of the common tongue of India, called Moors by the English, and Ourdouzebain by the natives of the land."

== Early military service ==
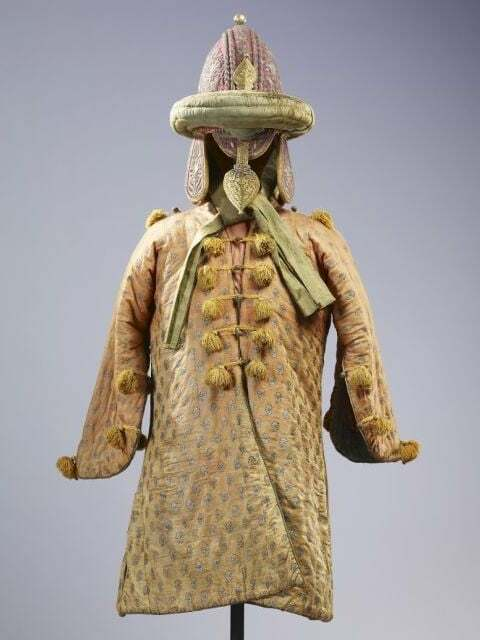
War coat used by Tipu Sultan of Mysore.c. 1785-1790

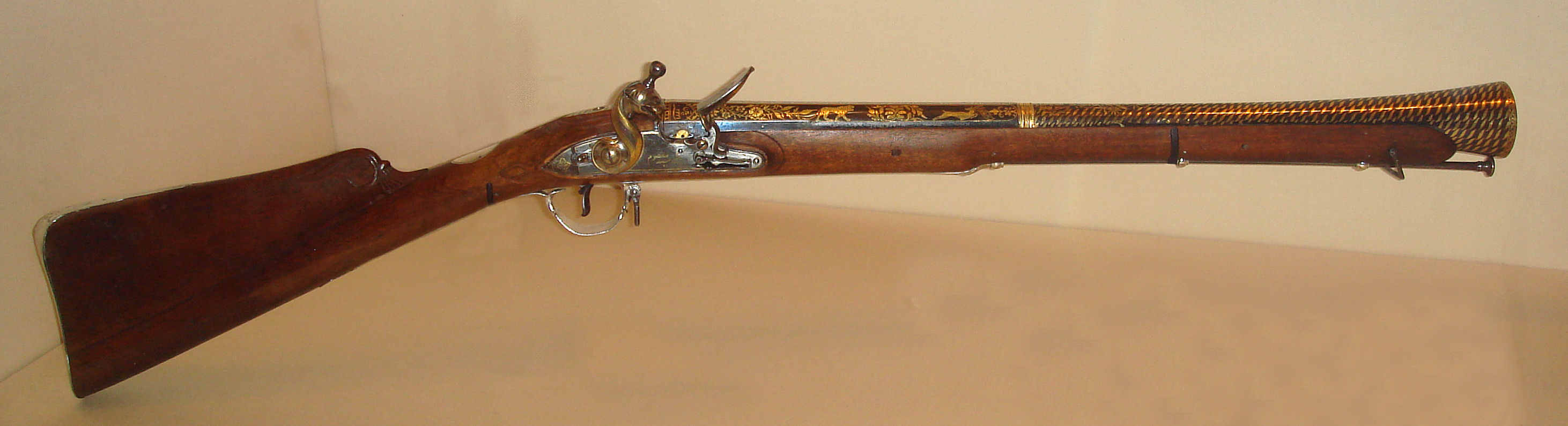
A blunderbuss, built for Tipu Sultan in Srirangapatna, 1793–1794. Tipu Sultan used many Western craftsmen, and this gun reflects the most up-to-date technologies of the time.

=== Early Conflicts ===
Tipu Sultan was instructed in military tactics by French officers in the employment of his father. At age 15, he accompanied his father against the British in the First Anglo-Mysore War in 1766. He commanded a corps of cavalry in the invasion of Carnatic in 1767 at age 16. He also took part in the First Anglo-Maratha War of 1775–1779.

Alexander Beatson, who published a volume on the Fourth Mysore War entitled View of the Origin and Conduct of the War with Tippoo Sultaun, described Tipu Sultan as follows: "His stature was about five feet eight inches; he had a short neck, square shoulders, and was rather corpulent: his limbs were small, particularly his feet and hands; he had large full eyes, small arched eyebrows, and an aquiline nose; his complexion was fair, and the general expression of his countenance, not void of dignity".

=== Second Anglo-Mysore War ===
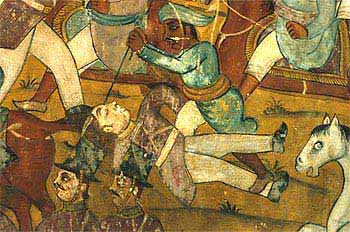
Mural of the Battle of Pollilur on the walls of Tipu's summer palace, painted to celebrate his triumph over the British

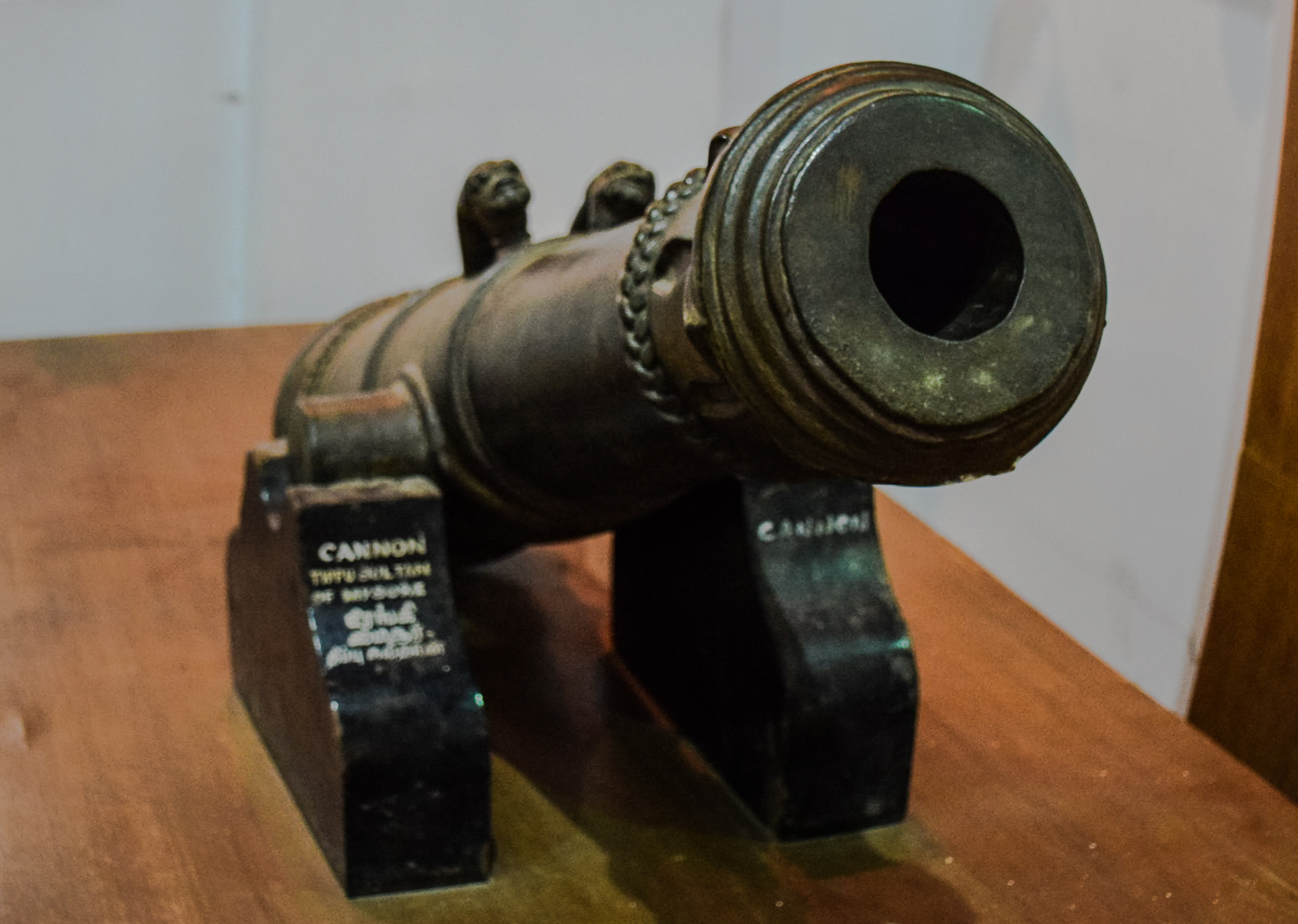
Very small Cannon used by Tipu Sultan's forces now in Government Museum (Egmore), Chennai

In 1779, the British captured the French-controlled port of Mahé which Tipu had placed under his protection, providing some troops for its defence. In response, Hyder launched an invasion of the Carnatic, with the aim of driving the British out of Madras. During this campaign in September 1780, Tipu Sultan was dispatched by Hyder Ali with 10,000 men and 18 guns to intercept Colonel William Baillie who was on his way to join Sir Hector Munro. In the Battle of Pollilur, Tipu defeated Baillie. Out of 360 Europeans, about 200 were captured alive, and the sepoys, who were about 3800 men, suffered very high casualties. Munro was moving south with a separate force to join Baillie, but on hearing the news of the defeat he retreated to Madras, abandoning his artillery in a water tank at Kanchipuram.

Tipu Sultan defeated Colonel Braithwaite at Annagudi near Tanjore on 18 February 1782. Braithwaite's forces, consisting of 100 Europeans, 300 cavalry, 1400 sepoys and 10 field pieces, was the standard size of the colonial armies. Tipu Sultan seized all guns and took the detachment prisoner. In December 1781 Tipu Sultan seized Chittur from the British. Tipu Sultan had gained sufficient military experience by the time Hyder Ali died on Friday, 6 December 1782. Some historians put Hyder Ali's death at 2 or 3 days later or before due to the Hijri date being 1 Muharram, 1197 as per some records in Persian (which can result in a difference of 1 to 3 days due to the Lunar Calendar). He became the ruler of Mysore on Sunday, 22 December 1782 (the inscriptions in some of Tipu's regalia show it as 20 Muharram, 1197 Hijri Sunday) in a simple coronation ceremony. He subsequently worked on to check the advances of the British by making alliances with the Marathas and the Mughals. The Second Mysore War came to an end with the 1784 Treaty of Mangalore.

== Ruler of Mysore ==
On 29 December 1782, Tipu Sultan crowned himself Badshah or Emperor of Mysore with the title Nawab Tipu Sultan Bahadur at age 32, and struck coinage.

=== Conflicts with Maratha Confederacy ===
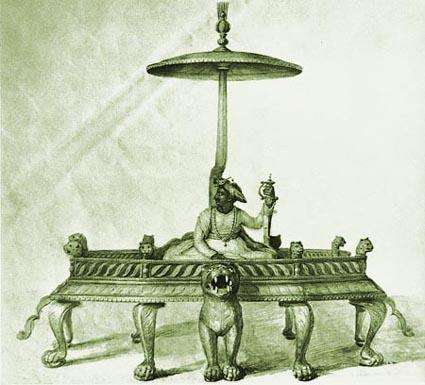
Tipu Sultan seated on his throne (1800), by Anna Tonelli

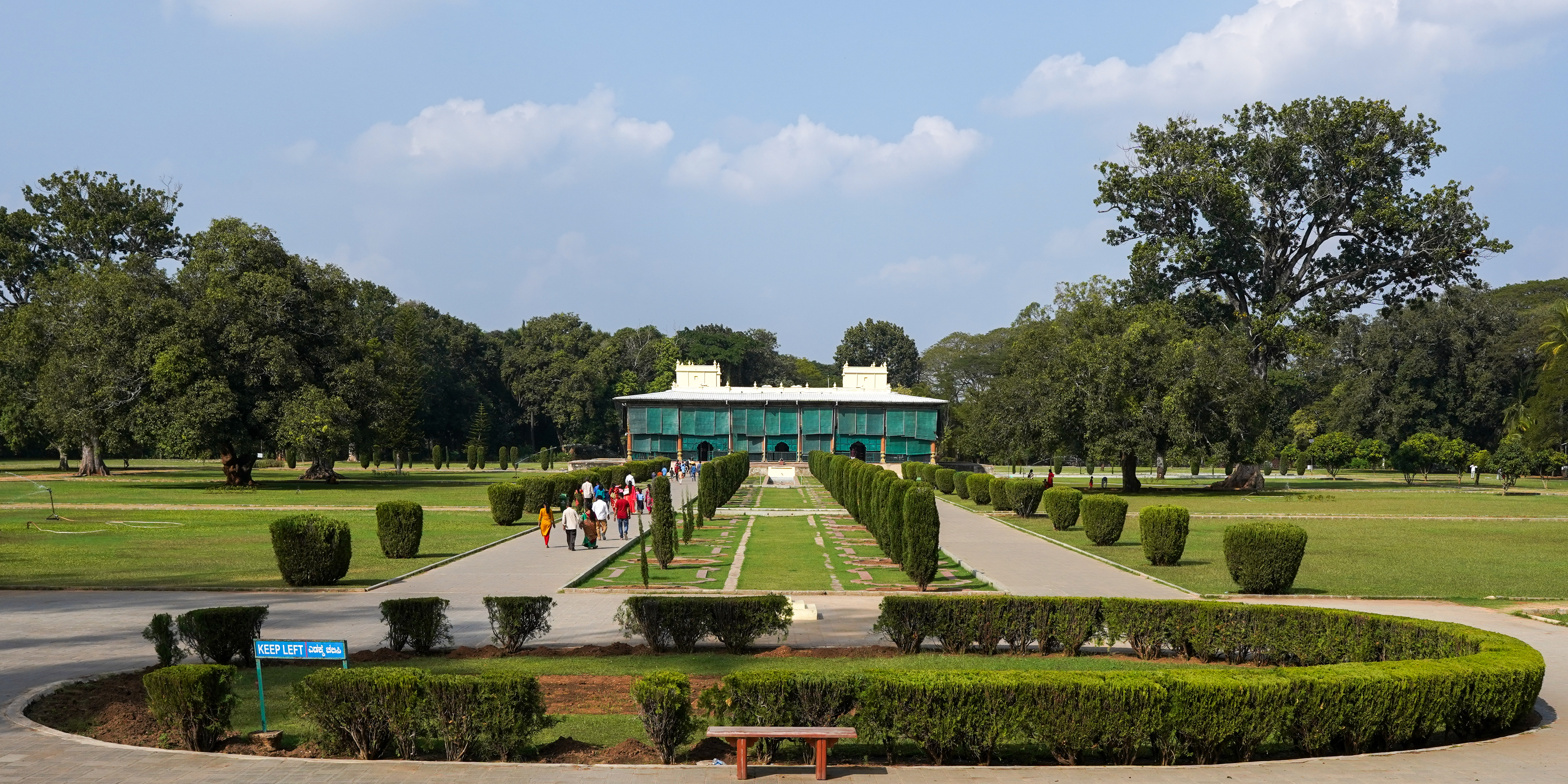
Tipu Sultan's Summer Palace at Srirangapatna, Karnataka

The Maratha Empire under its new Peshwa Madhavrao I regained most of Indian subcontinent, twice defeating Tipu's father in 1764 and then in 1767. In 1767 Maratha Peshwa Madhavrao defeated both Hyder Ali and Tipu Sultan and entered Srirangapatna, the capital of Mysore. Hyder Ali accepted the authority of Madhavrao who gave him the title of Nawab of Mysore.

Subsequently, to escape the treaty, Tipu tried to take some Maratha forts in Southern India captured by in the previous war and also stopped the tribute to Marathas which was promised by Hyder Ali. This brought Tipu in direct conflict with the Marathas, leading to Maratha–Mysore War Conflicts between Mysore (under Tipu) and Marathas:

- Siege of Nargund during February 1785 won by Mysore
- Siege of Badami during May 1786 in which Mysore surrendered
- Siege of Adoni during June 1786 won by Mysore
- Battle of Gajendragad, June 1786 won by Marathas
- Battle of Savanur during October 1786 won by Mysore
- Siege of Bahadur Benda during January 1787 won by Mysore

Conflict ended with Treaty of Gajendragad in March 1787, as per which Tipu returned all the territory captured by Hyder Ali to Maratha Empire. Tipu would release Kalopant and return Adoni, Kittur, and Nargund to their previous rulers. Badami would be ceded to the Marathas and Tipu would also pay an annual tribute totaling 12 lakhs for an agreed period of 4 years to the Marathas. In return, Tipu Sultan would get all the region that he had captured during the war. This included Gajendragarh and Dharwar. The Marathas in return agreed to recognize his authority and to address Tipu sultan as "Nabob Tipu Sultan Futteh Ally Khan". However the Marathas ultimately reneged on the treaty and in the Fourth Anglo-Mysore War the Marathas presented their support to the British East India Company which helped the British to take over Mysore in 1799.

=== Invasion of Malabar (1766–1790) ===
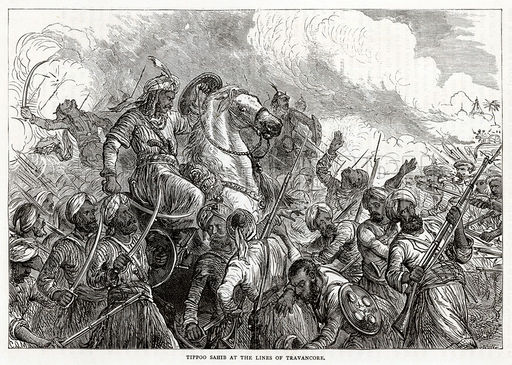
Tipu Sultan at the lines of Travancore.

In 1766 when he was 15 years old Tipu accompanied his father on an invasion of Malabar. After the incident- Siege of Tellicherry in Thalassery in North Malabar, Hyder Ali started losing his territories in Malabar. Tipu came from Mysore to reinstate the authority over Malabar. After the Battle of the Nedumkotta (1789–90), due to the monsoon flood, the stiff resistance of the Travancore forces and news about the attack of British in Srirangapatnam he went back.

=== Third Anglo-Mysore War ===
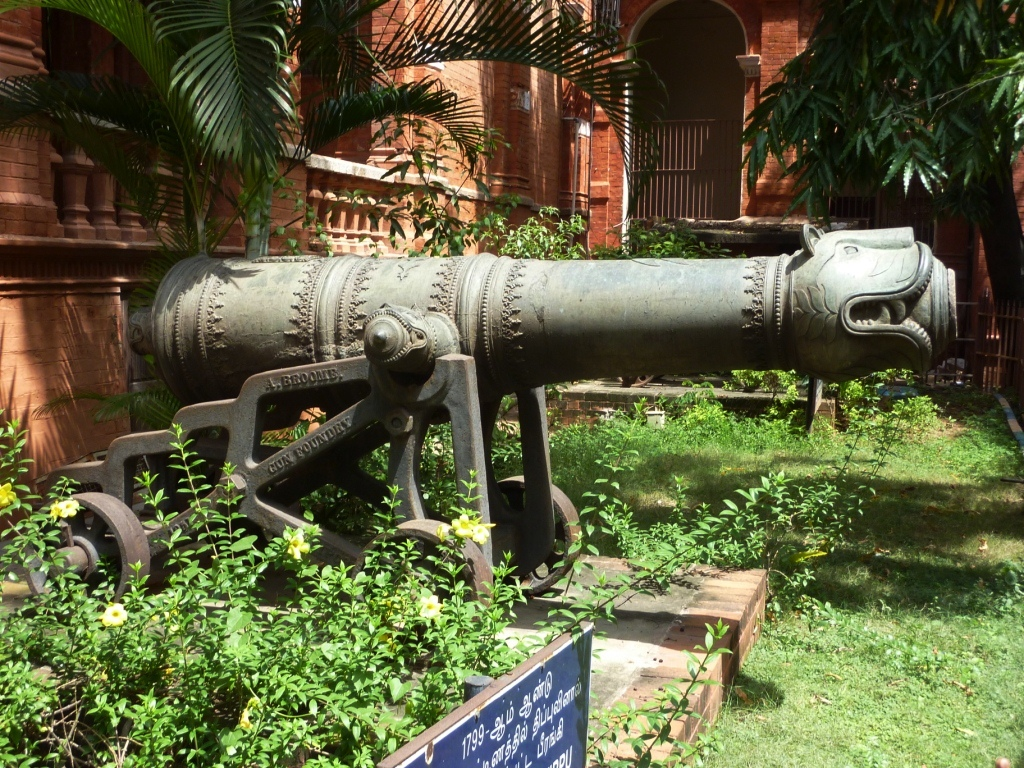
Cannon used by Tipu Sultan's forces at the battle of Srirangapatna 1799

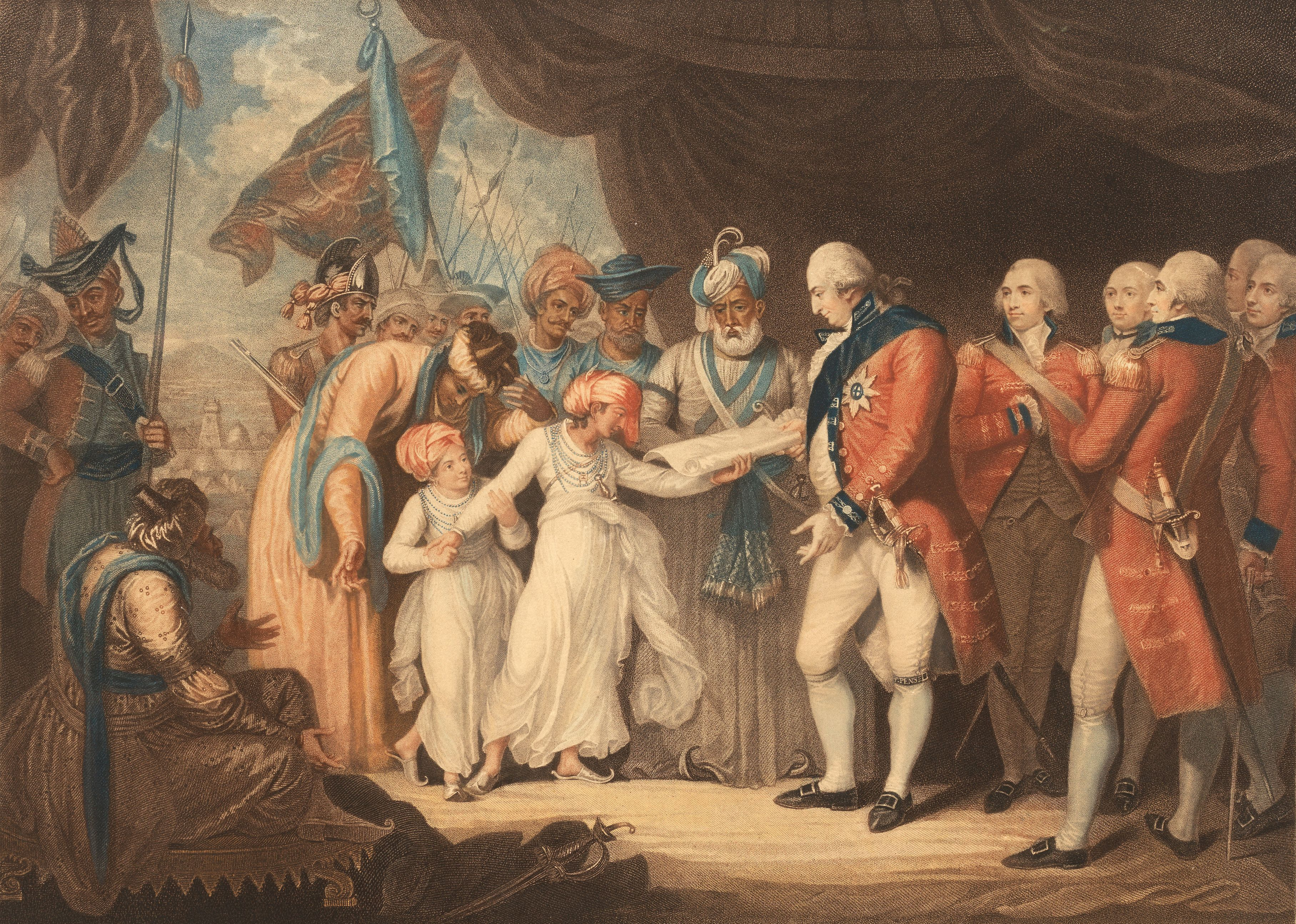
Lord Cornwallis receiving two of Tipu Sultan's sons as hostages on 26 February 1792

In 1789, Tipu Sultan disputed the acquisition by Dharma Raja of Travancore of two Dutch-held fortresses in Cochin. In December 1789 he massed troops at Coimbatore, and on 28 December made an attack on the lines of Travancore, knowing that Travancore was (according to the Treaty of Mangalore) an ally of the British East India Company. On account of the staunch resistance by the Travancore army, Tipu was unable to break through the Tranvancore lines and the Maharajah of Travancore appealed to the East India Company for help. In response, Lord Cornwallis mobilised company and British military forces, and formed alliances with the Marathas and the Nizam of Hyderabad to oppose Tipu. In 1790 the company forces advanced, taking control of much of the Coimbatore district. Tipu counter-attacked, regaining much of the territory, although the British continued to hold Coimbatore itself. He then descended into the Carnatic, eventually reaching Pondicherry, where he attempted without success to draw the French into the conflict.

In 1791 his opponents advanced on all fronts, with the main British force under Cornwallis taking Bangalore and threatening Srirangapatna. Tipu harassed the British supply and communication and embarked on a "scorched earth" policy of denying local resources to the British. In this last effort he was successful, as the lack of provisions forced Cornwallis to withdraw to Bangalore rather than attempt a siege of Srirangapatna. Following the withdrawal, Tipu sent forces to Coimbatore, which they retook after a lengthy siege.

The 1792 campaign was a failure for Tipu. The allied army was well-supplied, and Tipu was unable to prevent the junction of forces from Bangalore and Bombay before Srirangapatna. After about two weeks of siege, Tipu opened negotiations for terms of surrender. In the ensuing treaty, he was forced to cede half his territories to the allies, and deliver two of his sons as hostages until he paid in full three crores and thirty lakhs rupees fixed as war indemnity to the British for the campaign against him. He paid the amount in two instalments and got back his sons from Madras.

=== Napoleon's attempt at a junction ===
In 1794, with the support of French Republican officers, Tipu allegedly helped found the Jacobin Club of Mysore for 'framing laws comfortable with the laws of the Republic'. He planted a Liberty Tree and declared himself Citizen Tipoo. In a 2005 paper, historian Jean Boutier argued that the club's existence, and Tipu's involvement in it, was fabricated by the East India Company in order to justify British military intervention against Tipu.

One of the motivations of Napoleon's invasion of Egypt was to establish a junction with India against the British. Bonaparte wished to establish a French presence in the Middle East, with the ultimate dream of linking with Tippoo Sahib. Napoleon assured the French Directory that "as soon as he had conquered Egypt, he will establish relations with the Indian princes and, together with them, attack the English in their possessions." According to a 13 February 1798 report by Talleyrand: "Having occupied and fortified Egypt, we shall send a force of 15,000 men from Suez to India, to join the forces of Tipu-Sahib and drive away the English." Napoleon was unsuccessful in this strategy, losing the Siege of Acre in 1799 and at the Battle of Abukir in 1801.

Although I never supposed that he (Napoleon) possessed, allowing for some difference of education, the liberality of conduct and political views which were sometimes exhibited by old Hyder Ali, yet I did think he might have shown the same resolved and dogged spirit of resolution which induced Tipu Sahib to die manfully upon the breach of his capital city with his sabre clenched in his hand.

— Sir Walter Scott, commenting on the abdication of Napoleon Bonaparte in 1814

== Death ==
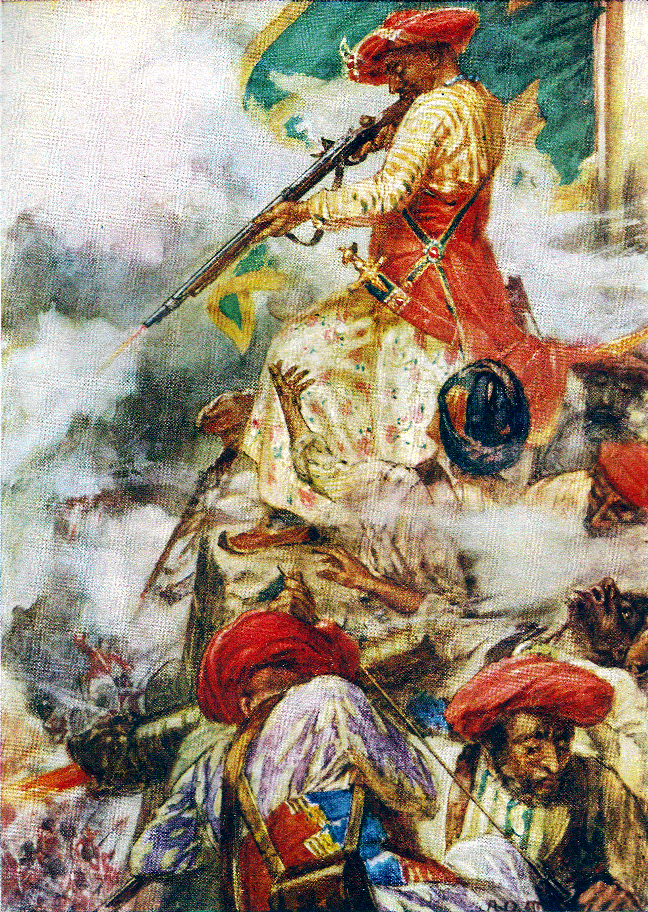
Tipu Sultan confronts his opponents during the Siege of Srirangapatna.

Horatio Nelson defeated François-Paul Brueys D'Aigalliers at the Battle of the Nile in Egypt in 1798. Three armies marched into Mysore in 1799—one from Bombay and two British, one of which included Arthur Wellesley. They besieged the capital Srirangapatna in the Fourth Mysore War. There were more than 60,000 soldiers of the British East India Company, approximately 4,000 Europeans and the rest Indians; while Tipu Sultan's forces numbered only around 30,000. The betrayal by Tipu Sultan's ministers in working with the British and in weakening the walls, made an easy path for the besieging armies. The death of Tipu Sultan led British General Harris to exclaim "Now India is ours."

When the British broke through the city walls, French military advisers told Tipu Sultan to escape via secret passages and to fight the rest of the war from other forts, but he refused. Tipu famously said "Better to live one day as a tiger than a thousand years as a sheep".

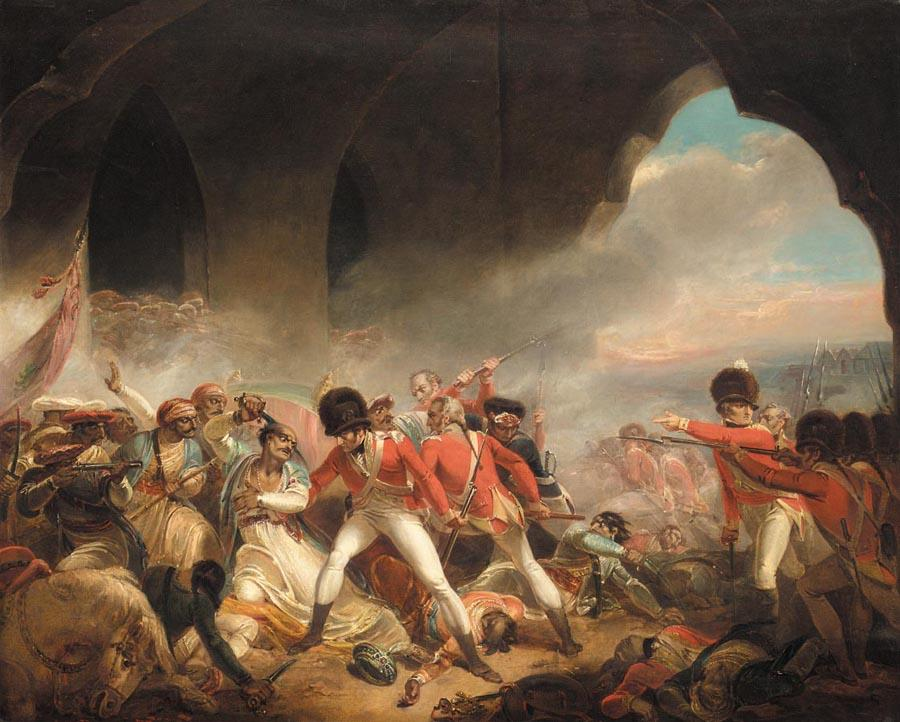
The Last Effort and Fall of Tippoo Sultaun by Henry Singleton, c. 1800

Tipu Sultan was killed at the Hoally (Diddy) Gateway, which was located 300 yards (270 m) from the N.E. Angle of the Srirangapatna Fort. He was buried the next afternoon at the Gumaz, next to the grave of his father. Many members of the British East India Company believed that Nawab of Carnatic Umdat Ul-Umra secretly provided assistance to Tipu Sultan during the war and sought his deposition after 1799. These five men include Mir Sadiq, Purnaiya, two military commanders Saiyed Saheb and Qamaruddin, and Mir Nadim, commandant of the fort of Seringapatam. The episode of treachery as narrated by Hasan starts with the disobedience of Tipu's instructions. When he died there were jubilant celebrations in Britain, with authors, playwrights and painters creating works to celebrate it. The death of Tipu Sultan was celebrated with the declaration of a public holiday in Britain.

== Administration ==
Tipu introduced a new calendar, new coinage, and seven new government departments, during his reign, and made military innovations in the use of rocketry.

=== Mysorean rockets ===
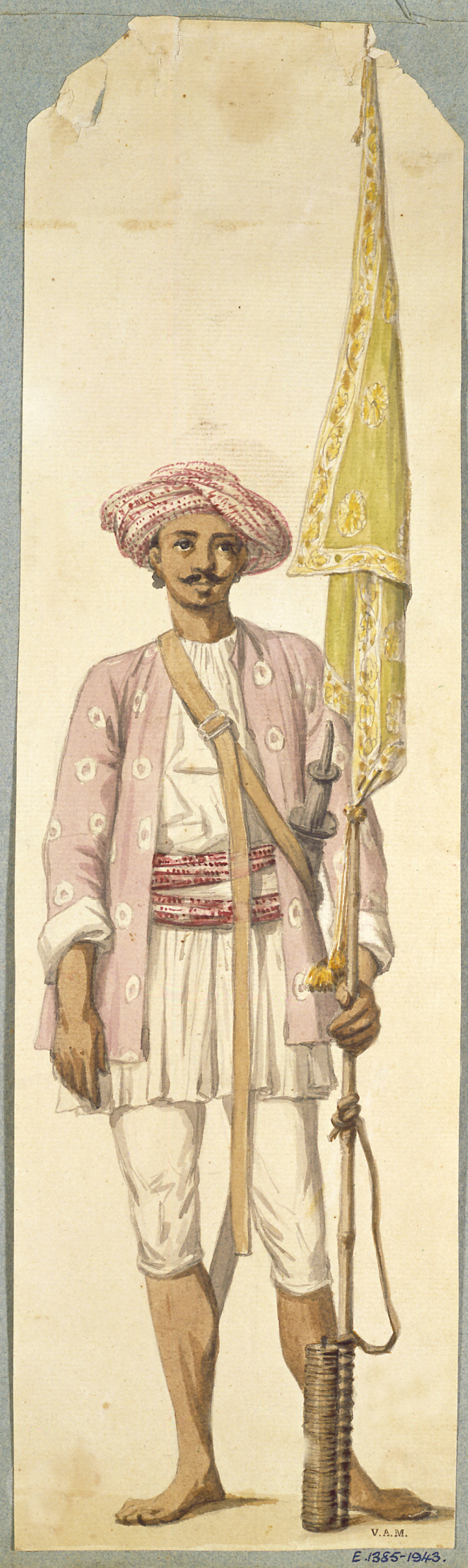
A soldier from Tipu Sultan's army, using his rocket as a flagstaff.

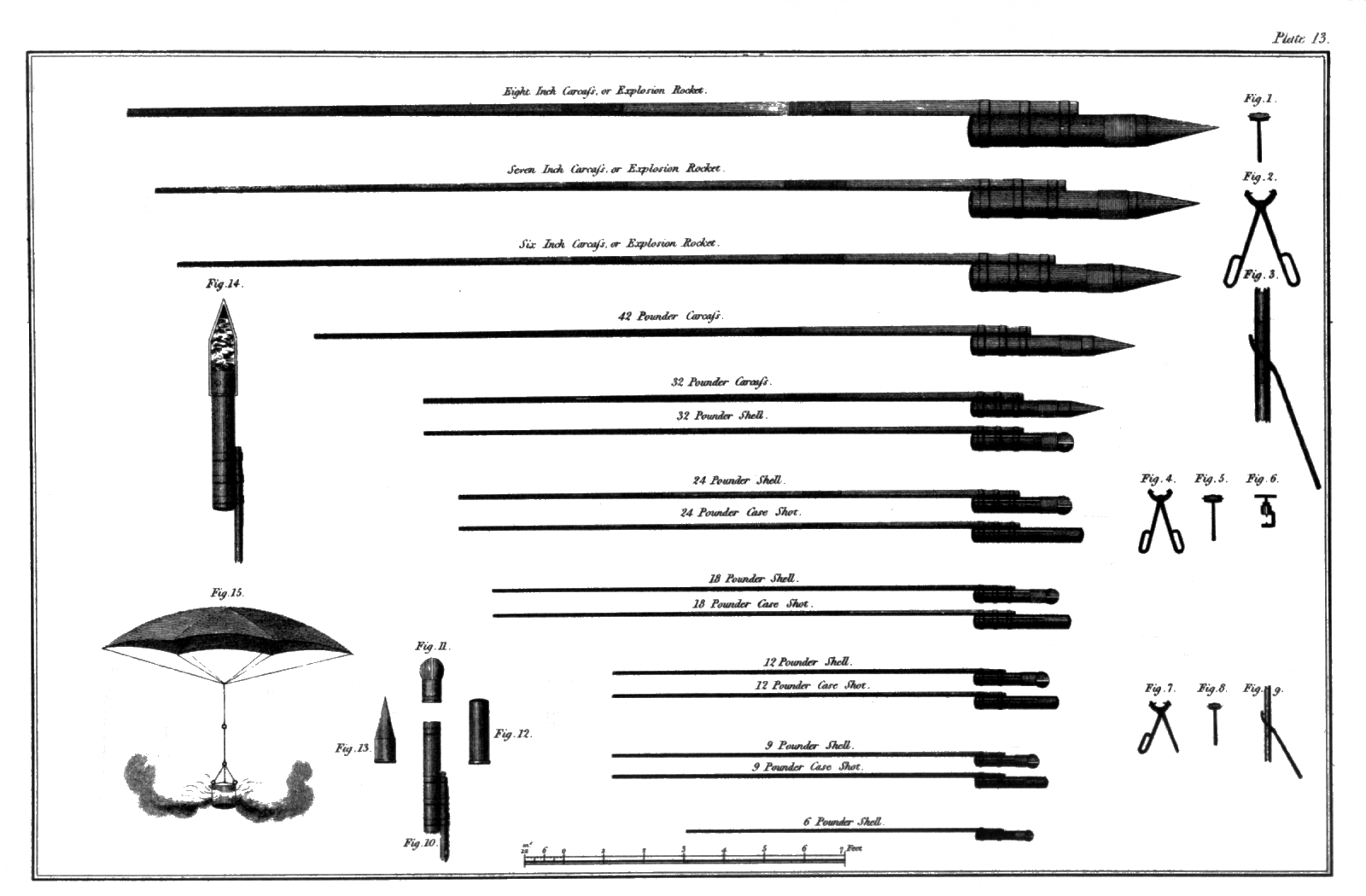
Tipu Sultan organised his Rocket artillery brigades known as Cushoons, Tipu Sultan expanded the number of servicemen in the various Cushoons from 1500 to almost 5000. The Mysorean rockets utilised by Tipu Sultan, were later updated by the British and successively employed during the Napoleonic Wars.

Dr APJ Abdul Kalam, the former President of India, in his Tipu Sultan Shaheed Memorial Lecture in Bangalore (30 November 1991), called Tipu Sultan the innovator of the world's first war rocket. Two of these rockets, captured by the British at Srirangapatna, were displayed in the Royal Artillery Museum in London. According to historian Dr Dulari Qureshi Tipu Sultan was a fierce warrior king and was so quick in his movement that it seemed to the enemy that he was fighting on many fronts at the same time. Tipu managed to subdue all the petty kingdoms in the south. He was also one of the few Indian rulers to have defeated British armies.

Tipu Sultan's father had expanded on Mysore's use of rocketry, making critical innovations in the rockets themselves and the military logistics of their use. He deployed as many as 1,200 specialised troops in his army to operate rocket launchers. These men were skilled in operating the weapons and were trained to launch their rockets at an angle calculated from the diameter of the cylinder and the distance to the target. The rockets had twin side sharpened blades mounted on them, and when fired en masse, spun and wreaked significant damage against a large army. Tipu greatly expanded the use of rockets after Hyder's death, deploying as many as 5,000 rocketeers at a time. The rockets deployed by Tipu during the Battle of Pollilur were much more advanced than those the British East India Company had previously seen, chiefly because of the use of iron tubes for holding the propellant; this enabled higher thrust and longer range for the missiles (up to 2 km range).

British accounts describe the use of the rockets during the third and fourth wars. During the climactic battle at Srirangapatna in 1799, British shells struck a magazine containing rockets, causing it to explode and send a towering cloud of black smoke with cascades of exploding white light rising up from the battlements. After Tipu's defeat in the fourth war the British captured a number of the Mysorean rockets. These became influential in British rocket development, inspiring the Congreve rocket, which was soon put into use in the Napoleonic Wars.

=== Navy ===
In 1786 Tipu Sultan, again following the lead of his father, decided to build a navy consisting of 20 battleships of 72 cannons and 20 frigates of 65 cannons. In the year 1790 he appointed Kamaluddin as his Mir Bahar and established massive dockyards at Jamalabad and Majidabad. Tipu Sultan's board of admiralty consisted of 11 commanders in service of a Mir Yam. A Mir Yam led 30 admirals and each one of them had two ships. Tipu Sultan ordered that the ships have copper-bottoms, an idea that increased the longevity of the ships and was introduced to Tipu by Admiral Suffren.

=== Army ===
Due to their perpetual battle engagements, Haidar and Tipu required a disciplined standing army. Thus, Rajputs, Muslims and able tribal men were enrolled for full time service replacing the local militia called the Kandachar force of agricultural origin which existed in the Mysore army earlier. The removal of the Vokkaligas from the local militia which had taken part in wars for centuries and the imposition of higher taxes on them in place of their quit rent led indirectly to the implementation of Ryotwari system. Now the Ryots could not rely upon slaves for their agricultural activities since their slaves were enrolled in the army in some places. Besides paying higher taxes they had to endure the additional responsibility of feeding the slaves and financing their marriages. This led to the weakening of the system of slavery in Mysore.

=== Economy ===
The peak of Mysore's economic power was under Tipu Sultan in the late 18th century. Along with his father Hyder Ali, he embarked on an ambitious program of economic development, aiming to increase the wealth and revenue of Mysore. Under his reign, Mysore overtook Bengal Subah as India's dominant economic power, with highly productive agriculture and textile manufacturing. Mysore's average income was five times higher than subsistence level at the time.

Tipu Sultan laid the foundation for the construction of the Kannambadi dam (present-day Krishna Raja Sagara or KRS dam) on the Kaveri river, as attested by an extant stone plaque bearing his name, but was unable to begin the construction. The dam was later built and opened in 1938. It is a major source of drinking water for the people of Mysore and Bangalore.

The Mysore silk industry was first initiated during the reign of Tipu Sultan. He sent an expert to Bengal Subah to study silk cultivation and processing, after which Mysore began developing polyvoltine silk.

The greater prominence of the Channapatna toys can be traced to patronage from Tipu Sultan, the historic ruler of Mysore, though these toys existed before this period historically given as gifts as part of Dusshera celebrations. It is known that he was an ardent admirer of arts, and in particular of woodwork.

==== Road development ====
Tipu Sultan was considered as pioneer of road construction, especially in Malabar, as part of his campaigns, he connected most of the cities by roads.

=== Foreign relations ===
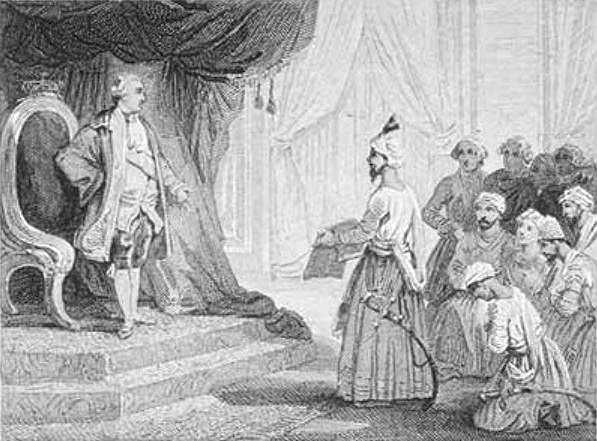
Louis XVI receives the ambassadors of Tipu Sultan in 1788. Tipu Sultan is known to have sent many diplomatic missions to France, the Ottoman Empire, Sultanate of Oman, Zand dynasty and Durrani Empire.

Mughal Empire

Both Hyder Ali and Tipu Sultan owed nominal allegiance to the Mughal Emperor Shah Alam II; both were described as Nabobs by the British East India Company in all existing treaties. But unlike the Nawab of Carnatic, they did not acknowledge the overlordship of the Nizam of Hyderabad.

Immediately after his coronation as Badshah, Tipu Sultan sought the investiture of the Mughal emperor. He earned the title "Nasib-ud-Daula" with the heavy heart of those loyal to Shah Alam II. Tipu was a selfdeclared "Sultan" this fact drew towards him the hostility of Nizam Ali Khan, the Nizam of Hyderabad, who clearly expressed his hostility by dissuading the Mughal emperor and laying claims on Mysore. Disheartened, Tipu Sultan began to establish contacts with other Muslim rulers of that period.

Tipu Sultan was the master of his own diplomacy with foreign nations, in his quest to rid India of the East India Company and to ensure the international strength of France. Like his father before him he fought battles on behalf of foreign nations which were not in the best interests of Shah Alam II.

After Ghulam Qadir had Shah Alam II blinded on 10 August 1788, Tipu Sultan is believed to have broken into tears.

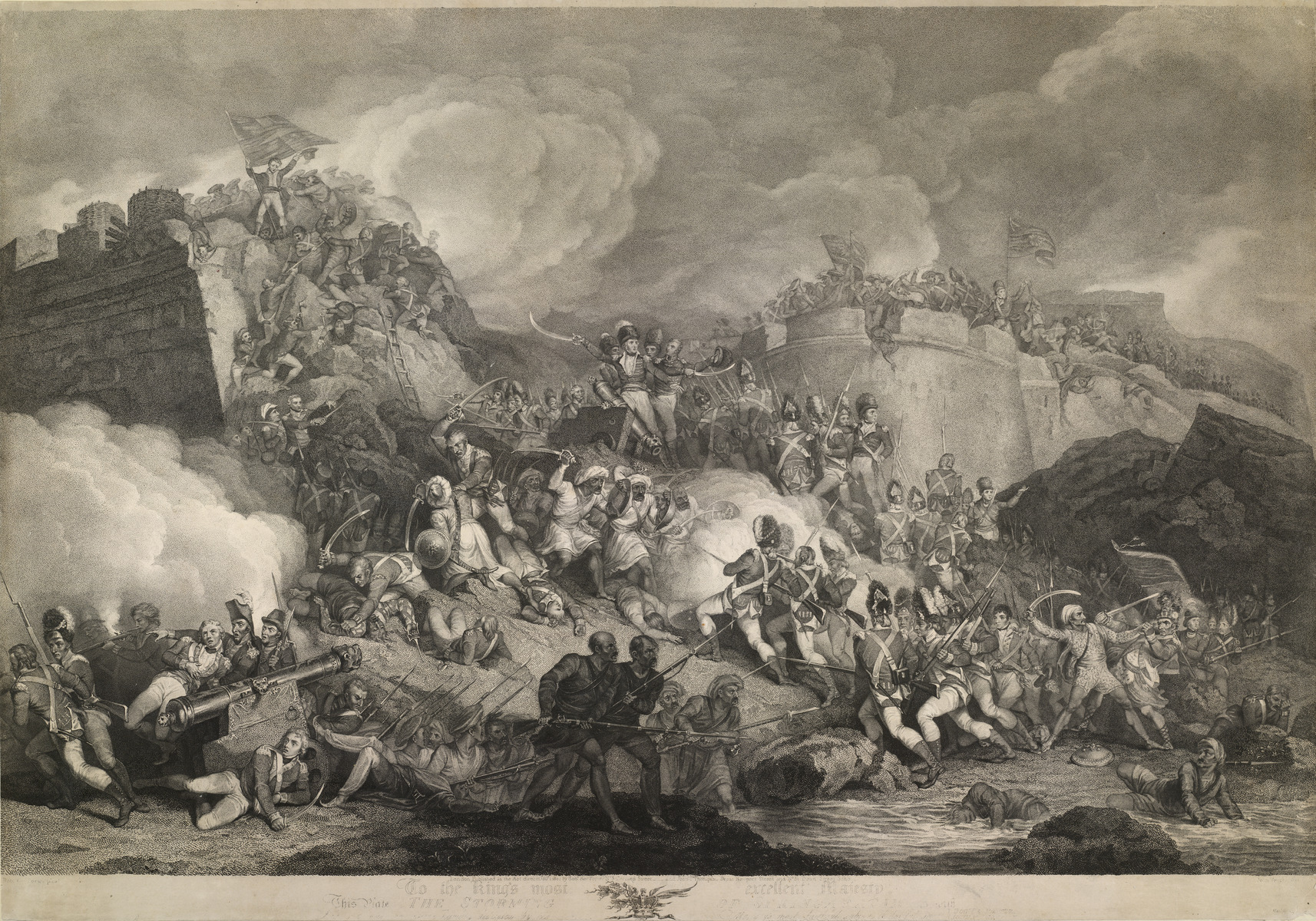
Tipu Sultan's forces during the Siege of Srirangapatna.

After the Fall of Seringapatam in 1799, the blind emperor did remorse for Tipu, but maintained his confidence in the Nizam of Hyderabad, who had now made peace with the British.

Afghanistan

After facing substantial threats from the Marathas, Tipu Sultan began to correspond with Zaman Shah Durrani, the ruler of the Afghan Durrani Empire, so they could defeat the British and Marathas. Initially, Zaman Shah agreed to help Tipu, but the Persian attack on Afghanistan's Western border diverted its forces, and hence no help could be provided to Tipu.

Ottoman Empire

In 1787, Tipu Sultan sent an embassy to the Ottoman capital Constantinople, to the Ottoman Sultan Abdul Hamid I requesting urgent assistance against the British East India Company. Tipu Sultan requested the Ottoman Sultan to send him troops and military experts. Furthermore, Tipu Sultan also requested permission from the Ottomans to contribute to the maintenance of the Islamic shrines in Mecca, Medina, Najaf and Karbala.

However, the Ottomans were themselves in crisis and still recuperating from the devastating Austro-Ottoman War and a new conflict with the Russian Empire had begun, for which Ottoman Turkey needed British alliance to keep off the Russians, hence it could not risk being hostile to the British in the Indian theatre.

Due to the Ottoman inability to organise a fleet in the Indian Ocean, Tipu Sultan's ambassadors returned home only with gifts from their Ottoman brothers.

Nevertheless, Tipu Sultan's correspondence with the Ottoman Empire and particularly its new Sultan Selim III continued till his final battle in the year 1799.

Persia and Oman

Like his father before him, Tipu Sultan maintained friendly relations with Mohammad Ali Khan, ruler of the Zand dynasty in Persia. Tipu Sultan also maintained correspondence with Hamad bin Said, the ruler of the Sultanate of Oman.

Qing China

Tipu's and Mysore's tryst with silk began in the early 1780s when he received an ambassador from the Qing dynasty-ruled China at his court. The ambassador presented him with a silk cloth. Tipu was said to be enchanted by the item to such an extent that he resolved to introduce its production in his kingdom. He sent a return journey to China, which returned after twelve years.

France

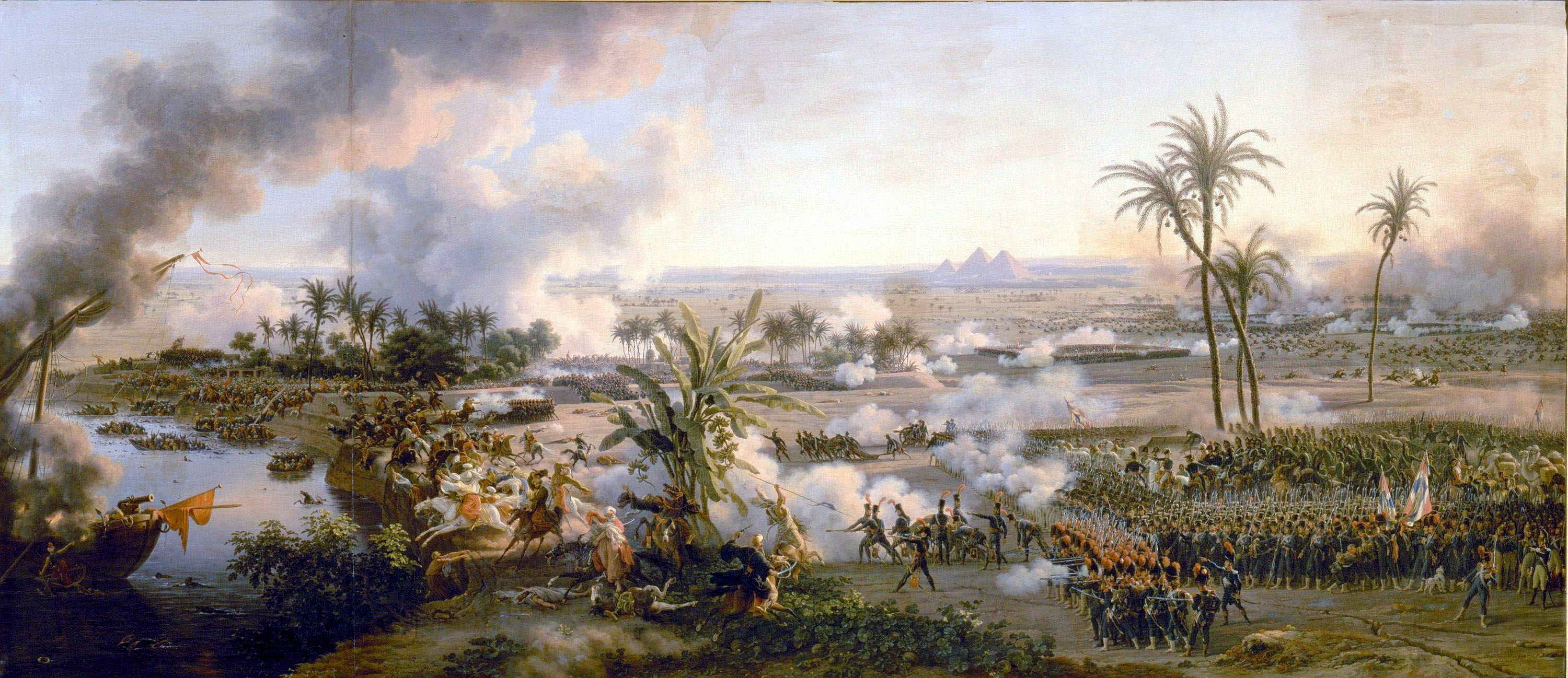
In his attempts to junction with Tipu Sultan, Napoleon annexed Ottoman Egypt in the year 1798.

Both Hyder Ali and Tipu sought an alliance with the French, the only European power still strong enough to challenge the British East India Company in the subcontinent. In 1782, Louis XVI concluded an alliance with the Peshwa Madhu Rao Narayan. This treaty enabled Bussy to move his troops to the Isle de France (now Mauritius). In the same year, French Admiral De Suffren ceremonially presented a portrait of Louis XVI to Haidar Ali and sought his alliance.

Napoleon conquered Egypt in an attempt to link with Tipu Sultan. In February 1798, Napoleon wrote a letter to Tipu Sultan appreciating his efforts of resisting the British annexation and plans, but this letter never reached Tipu and was seized by a British spy in Muscat. The idea of a possible Tipu-Napoleon alliance alarmed the British Governor, General Sir Richard Wellesley (also known as Lord Wellesley), so much that he immediately started large scale preparations for a final battle against Tipu Sultan.

=== Social system ===
==== Judicial system ====
Tipu Sultan appointed judges from both communities for Hindu and Muslim subjects. Qadi for Muslims and Pandit for Hindus in each province. Upper courts also had similar systems.

==== Moral Administration ====
Usage of liquor and prostitution were strictly prohibited in his administration. Usage and agriculture of psychedelics, such as Cannabis, was also prohibited.

Polyandry in Kerala was prohibited by Tipu Sultan. He passed a decree for all women to cover their breasts, which was not practised in Kerala in the previous era.

=== Religious policy ===
On a personal level, Tipu was a devout Muslim, saying his prayers daily and paying special attention to mosques in the area. Regular endowments were made during this period to about 156 Hindu temples, including the famed Ranganathaswami Temple at Srirangapatna. Many sources mention the appointment of Hindu officers in Tipu's administration and his land grants and endowments to Hindu temples, which are cited as evidence for his religious tolerance.

His religious legacy has become a source of considerable controversy in India, with some groups (including Christians and even Muslims) proclaiming him a great warrior for the faith or Ghazi for both religious and political reasons. Various sources describe the massacres, imprisonment and forced conversion of Hindus (Kodavas of Coorg, Nairs of Malabar) and Christians (Catholics of Mangalore), the destruction of churches and temples, and the clamping down on Muslims (Mappila of Kerala, the Mahdavia Muslims, the rulers of Savanur and the people of Hyderabad State), which are sometimes cited as evidence for his intolerance.

==== British accounts ====
Historians such as Brittlebank, Hasan, Chetty, Habib, and Saletare, amongst others, argue that controversial stories of Tipu Sultan's religious persecution of Hindus and Christians are largely derived from the work of early British authors (who were very much against Tipu Sultan's independence and harboured prejudice against the Sultan) such as James Kirkpatrick and Mark Wilks, whom they do not consider to be entirely reliable and likely fabricated. A. S. Chetty argues that Wilks' account in particular cannot be trusted.

Irfan Habib and Mohibbul Hasan argue that these early British authors had a strong vested interest in presenting Tipu Sultan as a tyrant from whom the British had liberated Mysore. This assessment is echoed by Brittlebank in her recent work where she writes that Wilks and Kirkpatrick must be used with particular care as both authors had taken part in the wars against Tipu Sultan and were closely connected to the administrations of Lord Cornwallis and Richard Wellesley, 1st Marquess Wellesley.

==== Relations with Hindus ====
Tipu Sultan's treasurer was Krishna Rao, Shamaiya Iyengar was his Minister of Post and Police, his brother Ranga Iyengar was also an officer, and Purnaiya held the very important post of "Mir Asaf". Moolchand and Sujan Rai were his chief agents at the Mughal court, and his chief "Peshkar", Suba Rao, was also a Hindu.

The Editor of Mysore Gazette reports of correspondence between his court and temples, and his having donated jewellery and deeded land grants to several temples, which he was compelled to for forming alliances with Hindu rulers. Between 1782 and 1799 Tipu Sultan issued 34 "Sanads" (deeds) of endowment to temples in his domain, while also presenting many of them with gifts of silver and gold plate.

The Srikanteswara Temple in Nanjangud still possesses a jeweled cup presented by the Sultan. He also gave a greenish linga; to Ranganatha temple at Srirangapatna, he donated seven silver cups and a silver camphor burner. This temple was hardly a stone's throw from his palace from where he would listen with equal respect to the ringing of temple bells and the muezzin's call from the mosque; to the Lakshmikanta Temple at Kalale he gifted four cups, a plate and Spitoon in silver.

During the Maratha–Mysore War in 1791, a group of Maratha horsemen under Raghunath Rao Patwardhan raided the temple and matha of Sringeri Shankaracharya. They wounded and killed many people, including Brahmins, plundered the monastery of all its valuable possessions, and desecrated the temple by displacing the image of goddess Sarada.

The incumbent Shankaracharya petitioned Tipu Sultan for help. About 30 letters written in Kannada, which were exchanged between Tipu Sultan's court and the Sringeri Shankaracharya, were discovered in 1916 by the Director of Archaeology in Mysore. Tipu Sultan expressed his indignation and grief at the news of the raid:

"People who have sinned against such a holy place are sure to suffer the consequences of their misdeeds at no distant date in this Kali age in accordance with the verse: "Hasadbhih kriyate karma rudadbhir-anubhuyate" (People do [evil] deeds smilingly but suffer the consequences crying)."

He immediately ordered the Asaf of Bednur to supply the Swami with 200 rahatis (fanams) in cash and other gifts and articles. Tipu Sultan's interest in the Sringeri temple continued for many years, and he was still writing to the Swami in the 1790s.

In light of this and other events, historian Irfan Habib has described Tipu Sultan as a defender of the Hindu dharma, who also patronised other temples including one at Melkote, for which he issued a Kannada decree that the Shrivaishnava invocatory verses there should be recited in the traditional form. The temple at Melkote still has gold and silver vessels with inscriptions indicating that they were presented by the Sultan. Tipu Sultan also presented four silver cups to the Lakshmikanta Temple at Kalale. Tipu Sultan does seem to have repossessed unauthorised grants of land made to Brahmins and temples, but those which had proper sanads (certificates) were not. It was a normal practice for any ruler, Muslim or Hindu, on his accession or on the conquest of new territory.

==== Persecution of Hindus in Melkote ====
Tipu killed 1200+ Iyengar Brahmins in Melkote, as part of his military campaign against the Wodeyars of Mysore and the Marathas. The Hindu Iyengar Brahmins, who were closely associated with the Sri Cheluvanarayana Swamy Temple in Melkote, were targeted during this attack.

The town of Melkote in Karnataka has stopped celebrating Deepavali as a mark of mourning for the massacre of Hindu Iyengar Brahmins carried out by Tipu Sultan's forces.

==== Persecution of Kodavas outside Mysore ====
Tipu got Runmust Khan, the Nawab of Kurnool, to launch a surprise attack upon the Kodavas who were besieged by the invading Muslim army. 500 were killed and over 40,000 Kodavas fled to the woods and concealed themselves in the mountains. Thousands of Kodavas were seized along with the Raja and held captive at Seringapatam.

Mohibbul Hasan, Prof. Sheikh Ali, and other historians cast great doubt on the scale of the deportations and forced conversions in Coorg in particular. Hassan says that it is difficult to estimate the real number of Kodava captured by Tipu.

In a letter to Runmust Khan, Tipu himself stated:

"We proceeded with the utmost speed, and, at once, made prisoners of 40,000 occasion-seeking and sedition-exciting Kodavas, who alarmed at the approach of our victorious army, had slunk into woods, and concealed themselves in lofty mountains, inaccessible even to birds. Then carrying them away from their native country (the native place of sedition) we raised them to the honour of Islam, and incorporated them into our Ahmedy corps."

=== Women ===
In 1785, Tipu Sultan predated Channar revolt with regards to women seeking to wear breast cloth. When he was informed about it being custom to not allow certain castes to wear breast cloth, he asked, "Do customs of this tribe impose any corresponding disability on males also? If not, such a disability on women alone is contrary to principles of justice and is, therefore discriminatory."

== The coinage system ==
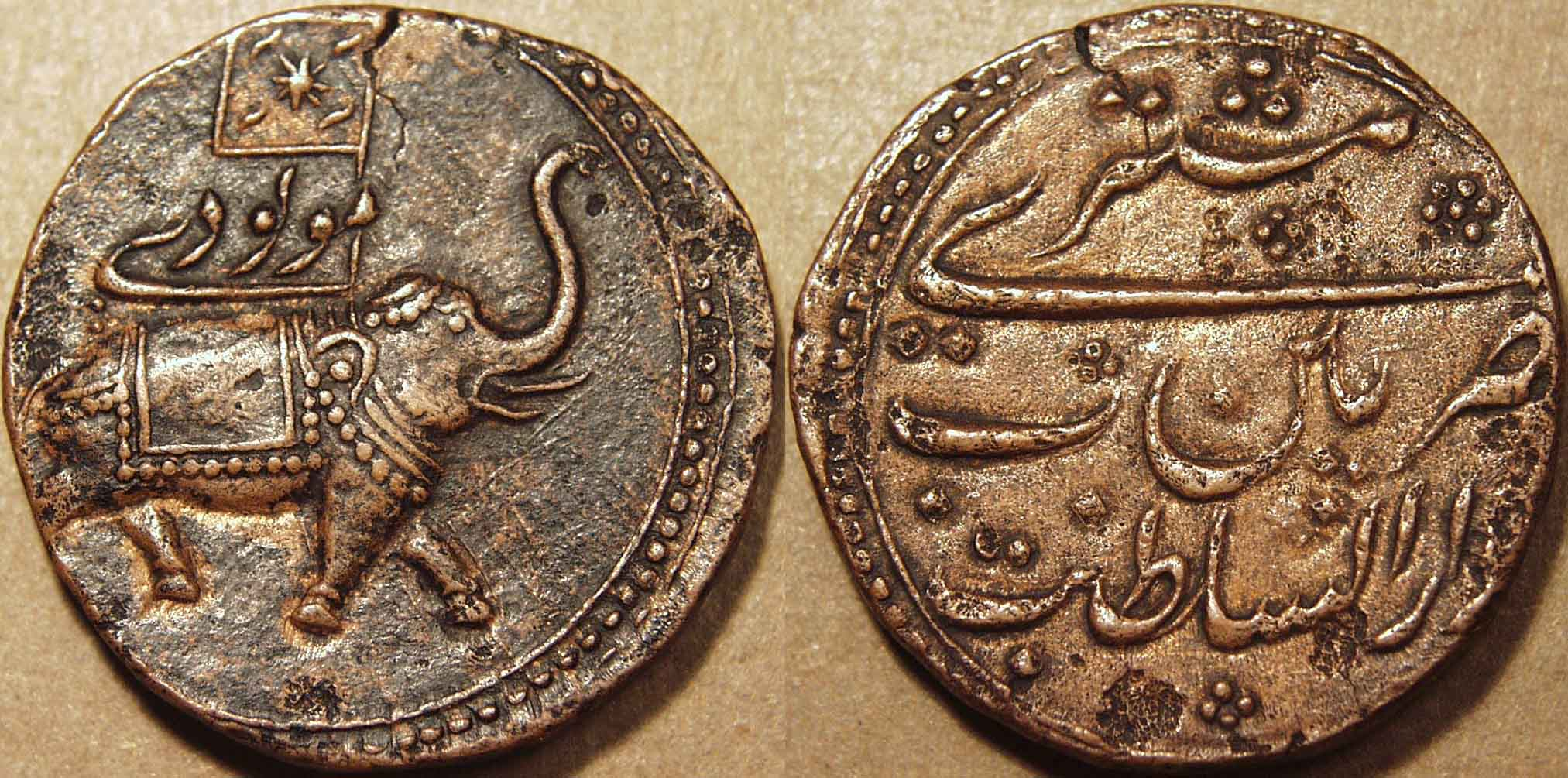
Among his many innovations, Tipu introduced new coin denominations and new coin types, including this copper double paisa weighing over 23 gm. The coin on the left also contains the emblem of the Sultanate of Mysore.

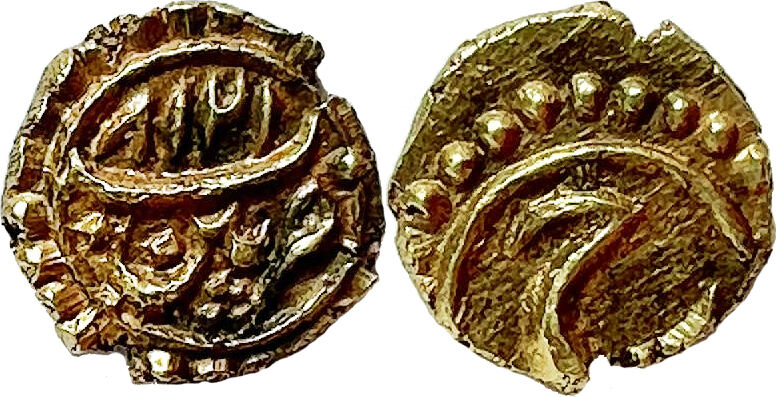
A gold coin issued by the Kingdom of Mysore during the reign of the Tipu Sultan.

The coinage of Tipu Sultan is one of the most complex and fascinating series struck in India during the 18th century. Local South India coinage had been struck in the area that became Mysore since ancient times, with the first gold coinage introduced about the 11th century (the elephant pagoda), and other pagodas continuing through the following centuries. These pagoda were always in the South Indian style until the reign of Haidar Ali (1761–1782), who added pagodas with Persian legends, plus a few very rare gold mohurs and silver rupees, always in the name of the Mughal emperor Shah Alam II plus the Arabic letter "ح" as the first letter of his name. His successor, Tipu Sultan, continued to issue pagodas, mohurs and rupees, with legends that were completely new. As for copper, the new large paisa was commenced by Haidar Ali in AH1195, two years before his death, with the elephant on the obverse, the mint on the reverse, and was continued throughout the reign of Tipu Sultan, who added other denominations. Tipu Sultan introduced a set of new Persian names for the various denominations, which appear on all of the gold and silver coins and on some of the copper. They were:

Copper: Qutb "قطب" for the 1/8 paisa (Persian for the pole star) – Akhtar "اختر" for the 1/4 paisa (star) – Bahram "بهرام" for the 1/2 paisa (the planet Mars) – Zohra "زهره" for the paisa (the planet Venus) – either Othmani "عثمانی" for the double-paisa (the third caliph of the Rashidun) or Mushtari "مشتری" (the planet Jupiter).

Silver: Khizri "خضری" for the 1/32 rupee (Khizr the prophet) – Kazimi "کاظمی" for the 1/16 rupee (for Musa, the seventh Shi'ite Imam) – Ja'fari "جعفری" for the 1/8 rupee (Ja'far al-Sadiq, the sixth Shi'ite Imam) – Bâqiri "باقری" for the 1/4 rupee (Muhammad al-Baqir, the fifth Imam) – Abidi "عبیدی" for the 1/2 rupee (Ali Zain al-'Abidin, the fourth Imam) – Imami for the rupee (reference to the 12 Shi'ite Imams) – Haidari "حیدری" for the double-rupee (lion, for Ali b. Abi Talib, who was both the fourth caliph and the first Shi'ite Imam).

Gold: Faruqi "فاروقی" for the pagoda (Umar al-Faruq, the second caliph) – Sadîqi "صدیقی" for the double-pagoda (Abu Bakr al-Sadiq, the first caliph) – Ahmadi "احمدی" for the four-pagoda ( "most praised ", one of the name of the Islamic prophet Muhammad). During his first 4 years, the large gold coin was the mohur, with an average weight of about 10.95g (AH1197-1200), replaced with the four-pagoda of 13.74g with the calendar change to the Mauludi "مولودی" system (AM1215-1219).

=== Coinage dating system ===
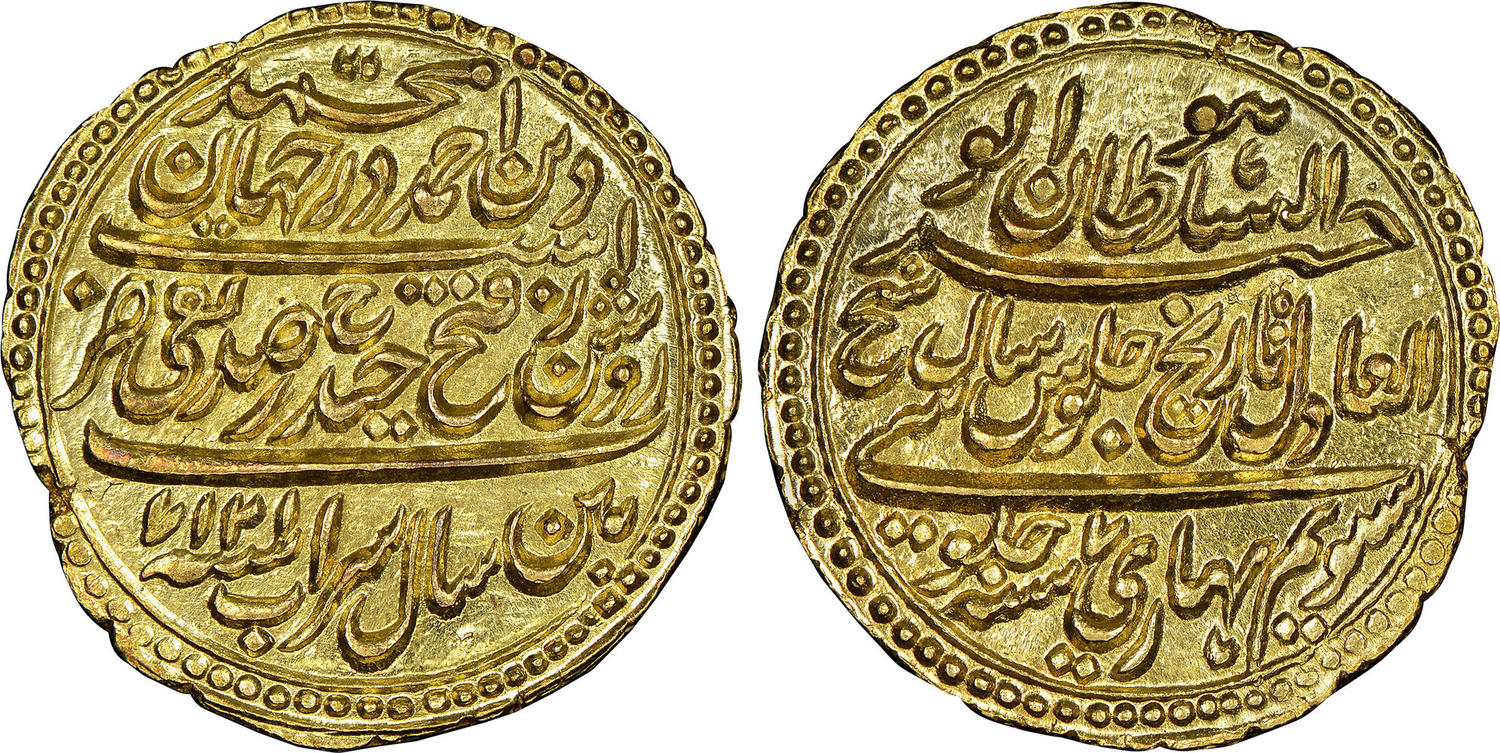
2 gold Two Pagoda Coins issued by tipu Sultan

The denomination does not appear on the Hijri dated gold coins, but was added on all the Mauludi dated pieces.

At the beginning of his first year, Tipu Sultan abandoned the Hijri dating system and introduced the Mauludi system (from the Arabic word "walad ", which means "birth "), based on the solar year and the birth year of Muhammad (actually 571 AD, but for some perplexing reason reckoned as 572 by Tipu Sultan for his staff).

From the beginning of his reign, Tipu Sultan added the name of the Indian cyclic year on the large silver and gold coins, including this double-pagoda, together with his regnal year. Each of the names is Persian, though in several examples, the meaning of the names in India was different from the Iranian meaning (not indicated here). According to the Indian meanings, these are the cyclic years: Zaki "زکي" for cyclic 37, which corresponded to his year 1 ( "pure ") – Azâl "أزل" for 38 ( "eternity ", year 2) – Jalal "جَلال" for 39 ( "splendor ", year 3) – Dalv "دَلو" for 40 (the sign of Aquarius, year 4) – Shâ "شاه" for 41 ( "king ", year 5) – Sârâ "سارا" for 42 ( "fragrant ", year 6) – Sarâb "سراب" for 43 ( "mirage ", for year 7) – Shitâ "شتا" for 44 ( "winter ", year 8) – Zabarjad "زبرجد" for 45 ( "topaz ", year 9) – sahar "سَحَر" ( "dawn ", year 10) – Sâher "ساحِر" ( "magician ", year 11).

== Assessment and legacy ==
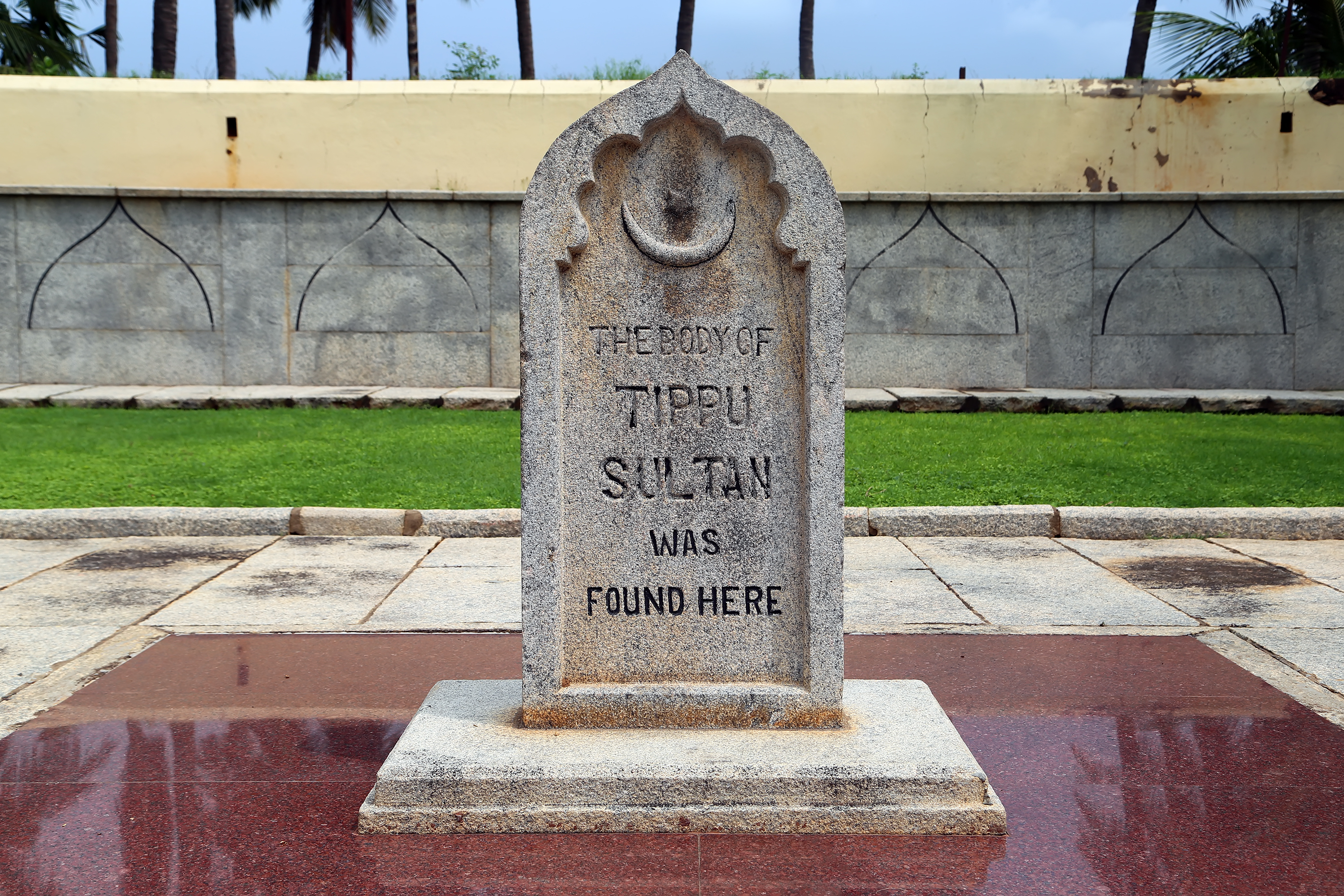
The spot in Srirangapatna where Tipu's body was found

India

The original copy of the Constitution of India bears a painting of Tipu Sultan. School and college textbooks in India officially recognize him as a "freedom-fighter" along with many other rulers of the 18th century who fought European powers.

Assessments of Tipu Sultan have often been passionate and divided. Successive Indian National Congress governments have often celebrated Tipu Sultan's memory and monuments and relics of his rule while the Bharatiya Janata Party has been largely critical.

In 2017 the 14th Indian president Ram Nath Kovind hailed Tipu Sultan in his address to the Karnataka Assembly on the occasion of the Diamond Jubilee celebrations of the state secretariat Vidhana Soudha saying "Tipu Sultan died a heroic death fighting the British. He was also a pioneer in the development and use of Mysore rockets in warfare. This technology was later adopted by the Europeans."

Tipu Sultan has been admired by another Indian freedom fighter Subhas Chandra Bose, the former President Ram Nath Kovind, former President A. P. J. Abdul Kalam, and former President K. R. Narayanan.

On 21 October 1943, Subhas Chandra Bose proclaimed the Provisional Government of Azad Hind (Free India), and the proclamation highlighted the "Warriors" Tipu and his father Hyder Ali for their names are "forever engraved in letters of gold."

Pakistan

In Pakistan, Tipu Sultan is a household name and symbolises courage and bravery. There is a ship (guided missile destroyer) of Pakistan Navy that is named after him and is called PNS Tippu Sultan (D-185).

Tipu Sultan is also admired as a hero in Pakistan. Former Pakistani Prime Minister Imran Khan has said that he admires Tipu Sultan as a freedom fighter. He has admired Tipu on multiple occasions.

Former Prime Minister Benazir Bhutto said, "It is distressing to learn that some people believe that Tipu Sultan was anti-Hindu." Her father, former Prime Minister Zulfikar Ali Bhutto, was also an admirer of Tipu and in his library, he had kept Tipu Sultan's letters.

In 2025, in the Parliament of Pakistan, Minister Shahid Ahmed Khattak, quoted Tipu Sultan in his criticism of the Prime Minister Shehbaz Sharif.

Abroad

In his sermon on 4 July 1800, John Russell, a Baptist minister in Providence, told his congregation of Tipu’s death at the hands of British soldiers: ‘here the full heart must have vent… [Tipu Sultan] defended his power with a spirit which showed he deserved it. His death was worthy of a king.’

Art, media and culture

Tipu also patronised art forms such as Ganjifa cards, effectively saving this art form. Ganjifa card of Mysore have the GI Tag today.

Several TV series on Tipu Sultan have been released in India and Pakistan, such as:

- Tipu Sultan: The Tiger Lord, Pakistani television series about the sultan
- The Dreams of Tipu Sultan, Indian play about the sultan by Girish Karnad
- The Sword of Tipu Sultan, Indian television series about the sultan

=== Sword and tiger ===
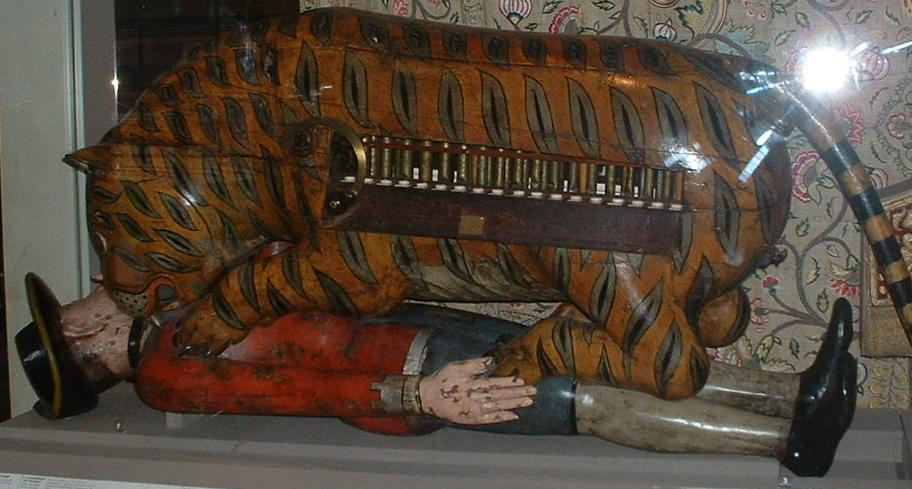
Tipu Sultan's Tiger. Victoria and Albert Museum, London

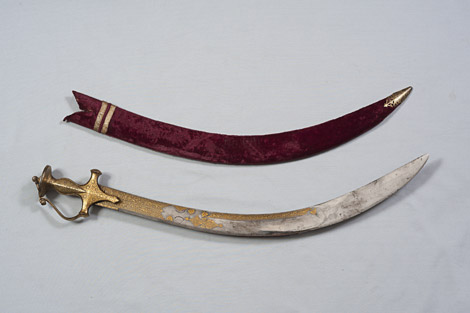
Sword of Tipu Sultan. National Museum, New Delhi

Tipu Sultan had lost his sword in a war with the Nairs of Travancore during the Battle of the Nedumkotta (1789), in which he was forced to withdraw due to the severe joint attack from the Travancore army and British army. The Nair army under the leadership of Raja Kesavadas again defeated the army of Tipu near Aluva. The Maharaja, Dharma Raja, gave the famous sword to the Nawab of Arcot, from whom the sword was taken as a war trophy by the British after annexing Arcot and sent to London. The sword was on display at the Wallace Collection, No. 1 Manchester Square, London.

Tipu was commonly known as the Tiger of Mysore and adopted this animal as the symbol (bubri/babri) of his rule. It is said that Tipu Sultan was hunting in the forest with a French friend. They came face to face with a tiger there. The tiger first pounced on the French soldier and killed him. Tipu's gun did not work, and his dagger fell on the ground as the tiger jumped on him. He reached for the dagger, picked it up, and killed the tiger with it. That earned him the name "the Tiger of Mysore". He even had French engineers build a mechanical tiger for his palace. The device, known as Tipu's Tiger, is on display in the Victoria and Albert Museum, London. Not only did Tipu place relics of tigers around his palace and domain, but also had the emblem of a tiger on his banners and some arms and weapons. Sometimes this tiger was very ornate and had inscriptions within the drawing, alluding to Tipu's faith – Islam. Historian Alexander Beatson reported that "in his palace was found a great variety of curious swords, daggers, fusils, pistols, and blunderbusses; some were of exquisite workmanship, mounted with gold, or silver, and beautifully inlaid and ornamented with tigers' heads and stripes, or with Persian and Arabic verses".

The last sword used by Tipu in his last battle, at Sri Rangapatnam, and the ring worn by him were taken by the British forces as war trophies. They are kept on display at the British Museum London as gifts to the museum from Maj-Gen Augustus W.H. Meyrick and Nancy Dowager. At an auction in London in April 2004, Vijay Mallya purchased a sword of Tipu Sultan and some other historical artefacts, and brought them back to India.

In October 2013, another sword owned by Tipu Sultan and decorated with his babri (tiger stripe motif) surfaced and was auctioned by Sotheby's. It was purchased for £98,500 by a telephone bidder.

=== Tipu Sultan Jayanti ===
In 2015, the Government of Karnataka, under the leadership of then Chief Minister Siddaramaiah from the Congress party, began to celebrate Tipu's birth anniversary as the "Tipu Sultan Jayanti". The Congress regime declared it as an annual event to be celebrated on 20 November. It was officially celebrated in Karnataka initially by the Minority Welfare department, and later by the Kannada & Culture department. However, on 29 July 2019, the next Chief Minister B. S. Yediyurappa, who belongs to the Bharatiya Janata Party (BJP), ordered the celebrations cancelled, saying: "Legislators from Kodagu had highlighted incidents of violence during Tipu Jayanti."

Objecting against the cancellation of the celebrations, the previous Chief Minister Siddaramaiah said: "BJP has cancelled it because of their hatred towards minorities. It's a big crime. He [Tipu] was a king of Mysore and fought against the British [as] a freedom fighter. It was during his time when the foundation was laid for the Krishna Raja Sagara dam. He also tried to improve industry, agriculture and trade". The previous year, not a single JD(S) leader, including the then chief minister HD Kumaraswamy, attended the event, turning it into a fiasco.

The Lok Sabha Congress leader, Mallikarjun Kharge, also earlier criticized BJP and RSS for their opposition against holding the celebrations, and asked: "When RSS can celebrate Nathuram Godse, can't we celebrate Tipu Sultan?"

=== In fiction ===
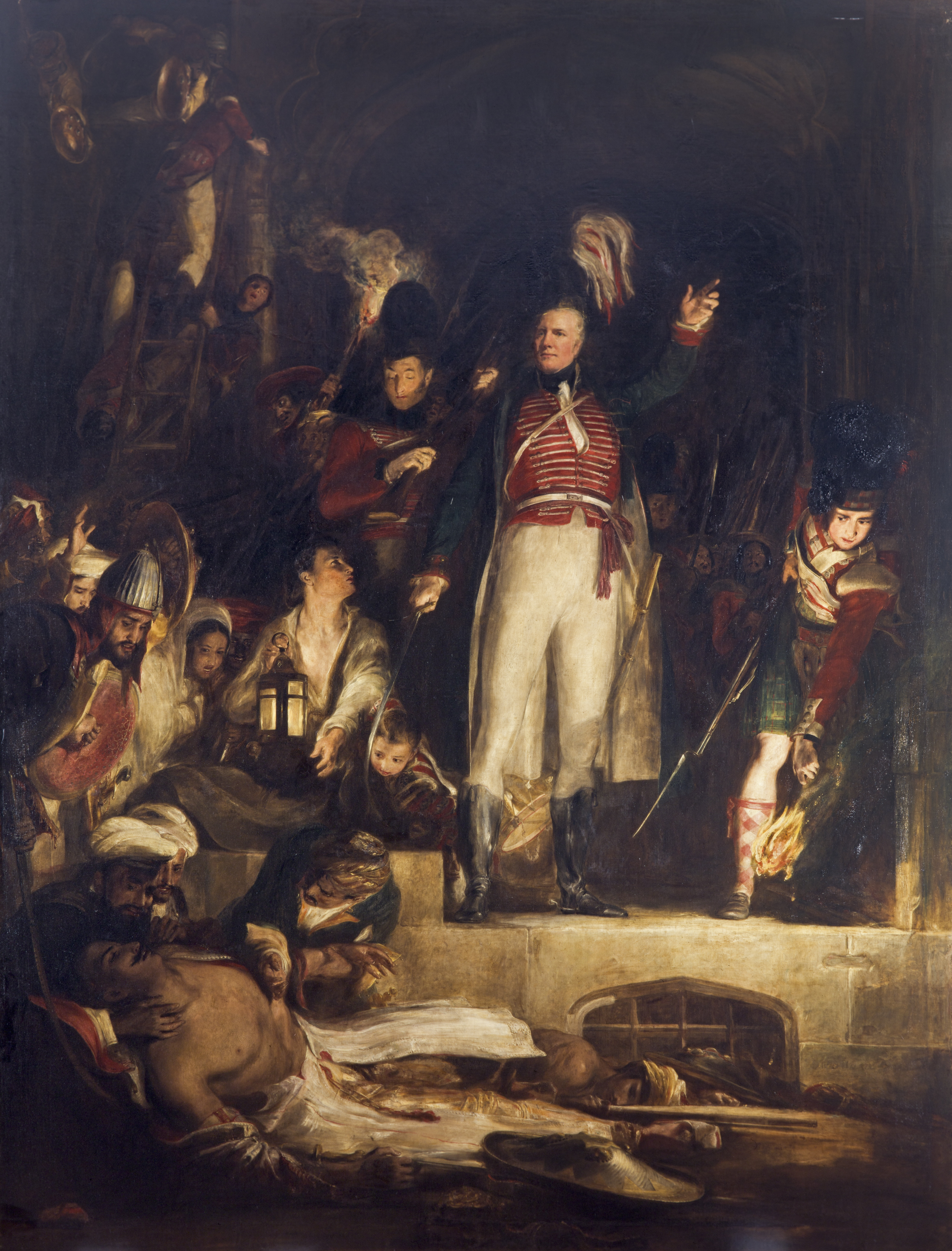
Sir David Baird Discovering the Body of Sultan Tipoo Sahib by David Wilkie, 1839

- He has a role in G. A. Henty's 1896 book The Tiger of Mysore, and is also mentioned in Henty's 1902 At the Point of the Bayonet, which deals with much of the same period.
- In Jules Verne's Mysterious Island, Captain Nemo is described as Tipu's nephew.
- He was portrayed by Paidi Jairaj in the 1959 Indian historical drama film Tipu Sultan, directed by Jagdish Gautam.
- Bharat Ek Khoj, a 1988 Indian television series based on Jawaharlal Nehru's The Discovery of India which aired on DD National, dedicated an episode to Tipu Sultan with Salim Ghouse portraying the king.
- Tipu's life and adventures were the central theme of a short-running South Indian television series The Adventures of Tipu Sultan, and of a more popular national television series The Sword of Tipu Sultan based on a historical novel by Bhagwan Gidwani.
- The Dreams of Tipu Sultan is a 1997 play written in Kannada by Indian writer Girish Karnad. It follows the last days as well as the historic moments in the life of Tipu, through the eyes of an Indian court historian and a British Oriental scholar.
- Tipu Sultan: The Tiger Lord is a Pakistani television series that broadcast on PTV in 1997, deals with the life of Sultan.
- Naseem Hijazi's novels Muazam Ali and Aur Talvar Ṭūṭ Gaye (And The Sword Broke) describe Tipu's wars.
- Wilkie Collins's novel The Moonstone contains an account of Tipu and the fall of Srirangapatna in the prologue.
- In The Surprising Adventures of Baron Munchausen by Rudolf Erich Raspe, Munchausen vanquishes Tipu near the end of the novel.
- Sharpe's Tiger is a novel by Bernard Cornwell in which Napoleonic–era British soldier Richard Sharpe fights at Seringapatam, later killing Tipu.
- Tipu appears as a "Great Person" in the video games, Sid Meier's Civilization: Revolution and Sid Meier's Civilization IV.
- In his historical Konkani-language novels on the Seringapatam captivity of Konkani Catholics by Indian littérateur V. J. P. Saldanha, Belthangaddicho Balthazar (Balthazar of Belthangady), Devache Krupen (By the Grace of God), Sardarachi Sinol (The sign of the Knights) and Infernachi Daram (The gates of Hell), Tipu is portrayed as "cunning, haughty, hard-hearted, revengeful, yet full of self-control".

== Family ==
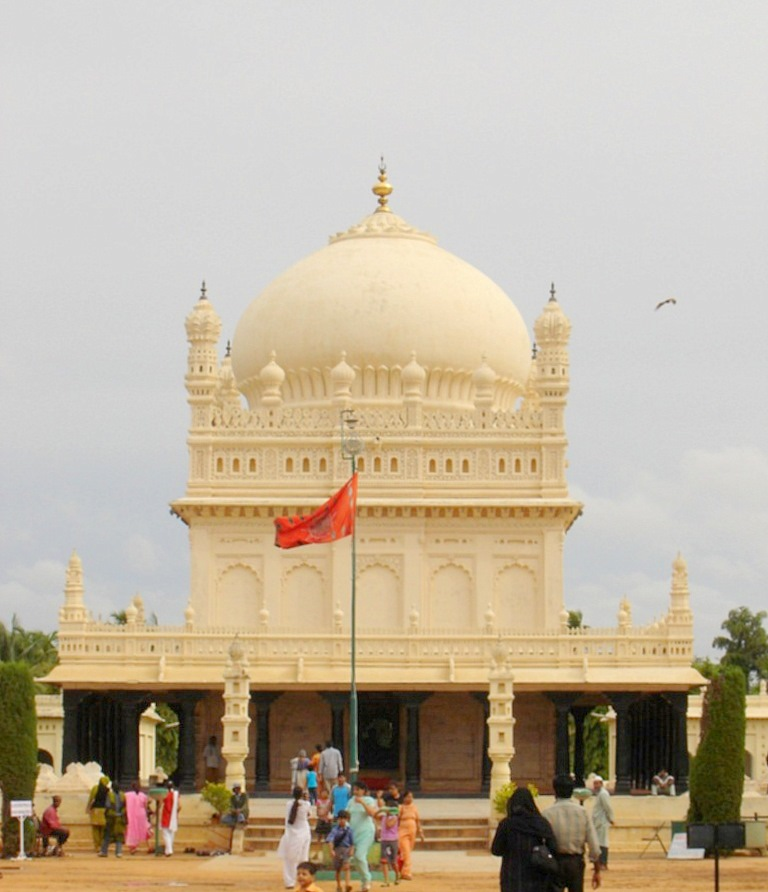
The mausoleum housing Tipu Sultan's tomb is another example of Islamic architecture.Tipu Sultan's flag is in the foreground.

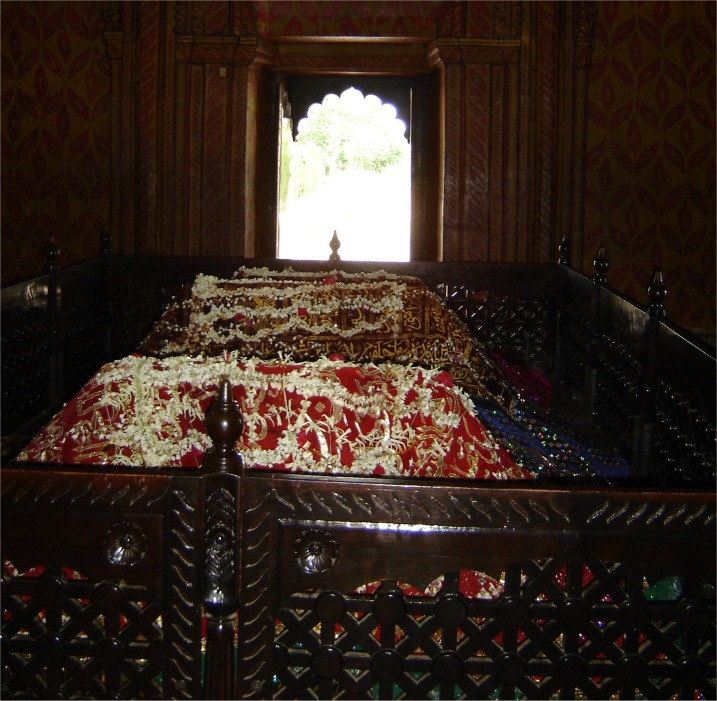
The tomb of Tipu Sultan at Srirangapatna. Tipu's tomb is adjacent to his mother's and father's graves.

Tipu had several wives. His first wife was Sultan Begum Sahib also known as Padishah Begum. She was the daughter of Imam Sahib Bakhshi Naita from Arcot, and sister of Ghulam Husain Khan, known as the Pondicherry Nawab, a descendant of Chanda Sahib. They married in 1774. Another wife married at the same time was Ruqaya Banu Begum. She was the daughter of Lala Miyan Shaheed Charkoli, and the sister of Sheikh Burhanuddin. She died in February 1792 at the time of the siege of Seringapatam. Another wife was Khadija Zaman Begum. She was the daughter of Mir Sayyid Moinuddin Khan also known as Sayyid Sahib. They married in 1796. She died in childbirth in 1797. Another wife was Buranti Begum. She was the daughter of Mir Muhammad Pasand Beg, a nobleman from Delhi and her mother's father was Sayyid Muhammad Khan, once a subedar of Kashmir. Another wife was Roshani Begum. She was the mother of his eldest son Fath Haider.

His sons were Hyder Ali Khan Sultan, Muin-ud-din Sultan, Abdul Khaliq Sultan, Muiz-ud-din Sultan, Muhammad Subhan Sultan, Shukrullah Sultan, Ghulam Ahmad Sultan, Ghulam Muhammad Sultan, Sarwar-ud-din Sultan, Muhammad Yasin Sultan, Jamal-ud-din Sultan and Munir-ud-din Sultan. One of his daughters was married to Husain Ali Khan.

== Image gallery ==
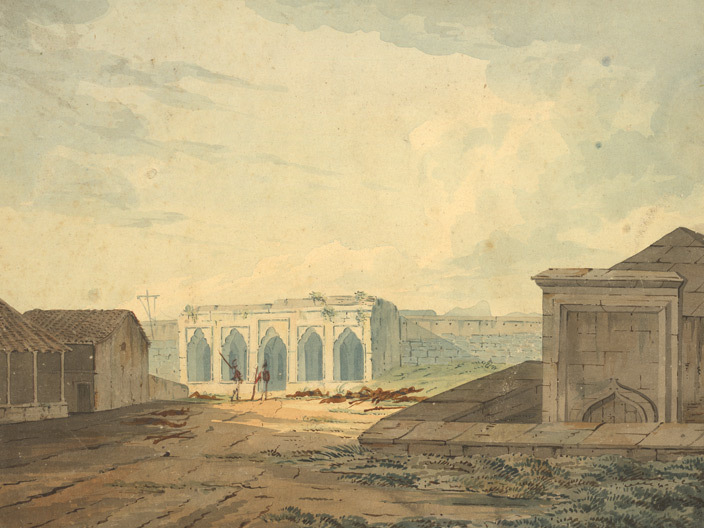
A view of the Hoally Gateway, Srirangapatnam, where Tipu Sultan was killed, Seringapatam (Mysore), by Thomas Sydenham (c. 1799)

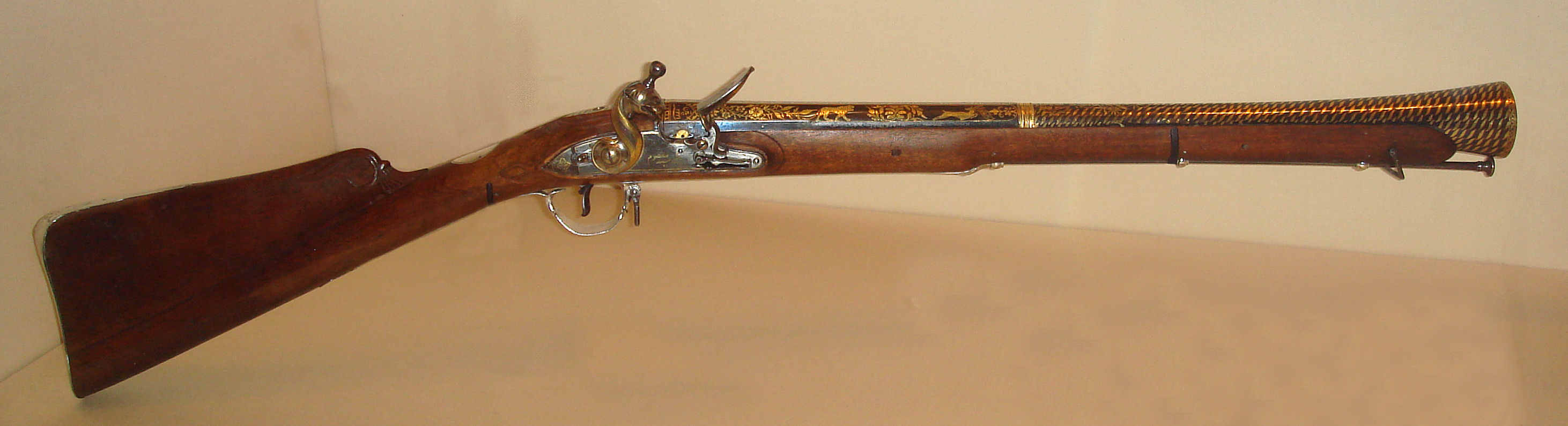
A flintlock blunderbuss, made for Tipu Sultan in Srirangapatnam in 1793–94. Tipu Sultan used many Western craftsmen, and this gun reflects the most up-to-date technologies of the time.

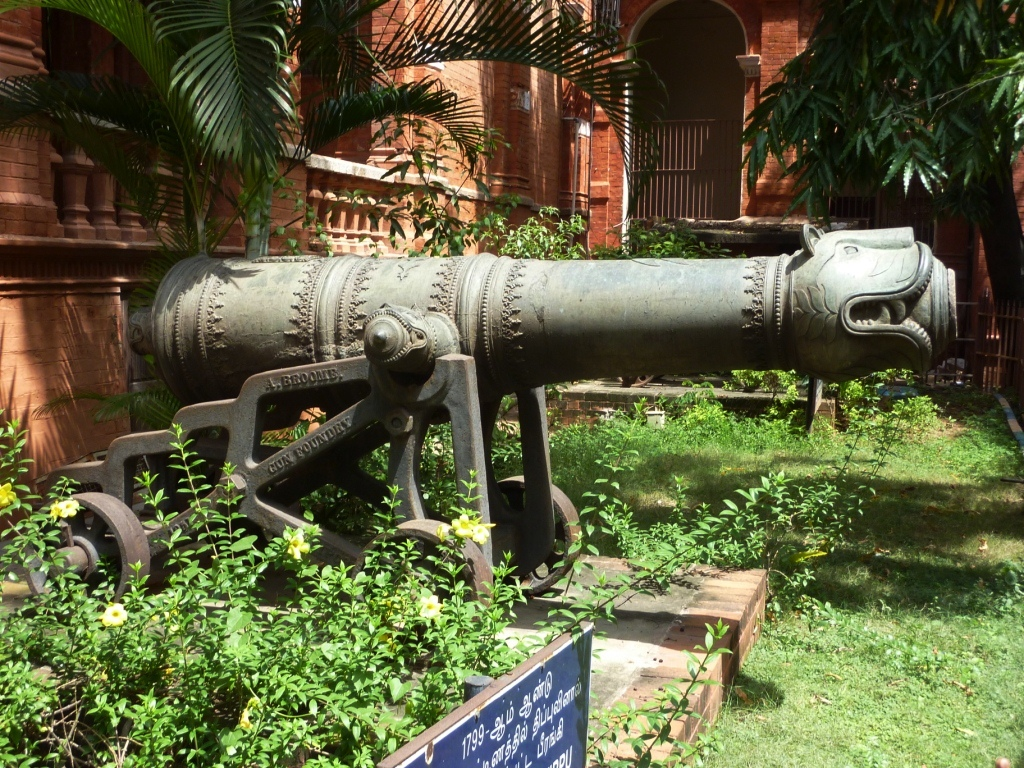
Cannon used by Tipu Sultan in the battle of Srirangapatnam 1799

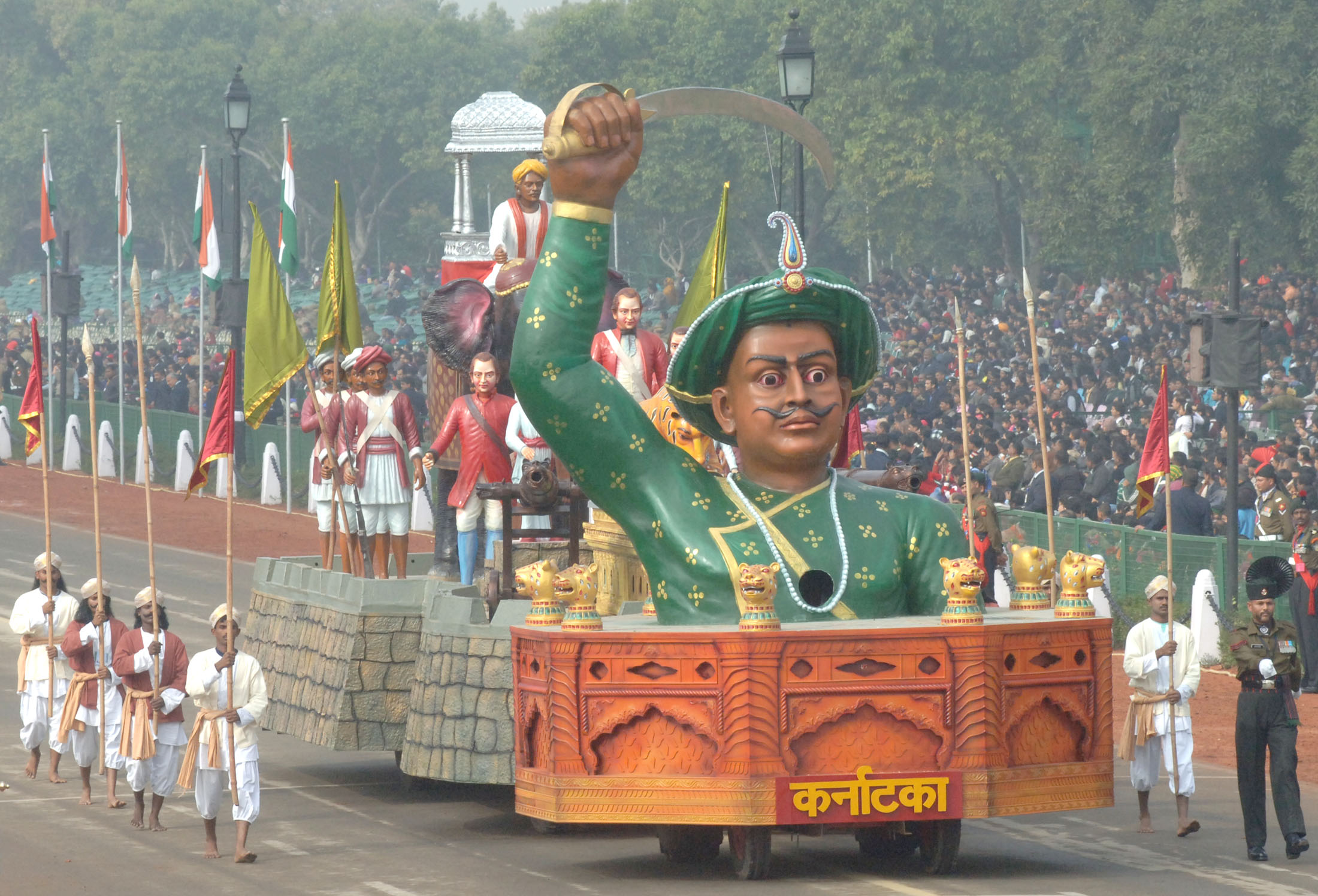
During the Republic Day Parade in 2014, in New Delhi, the tableau of Karnataka, highlighting "Tipu Sultan: The Tiger of Mysore," made its way through the Rajpath.

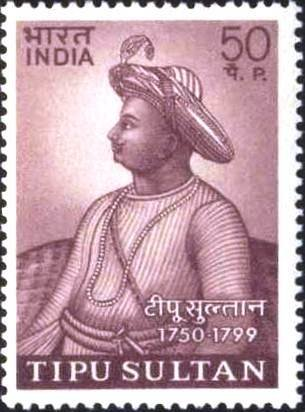
1974 Indian Postage stamp

== See also ==
- Muslim warriors
- Mysore invasion of Kerala
- PNS Tippu Sultan
- Tipu Jayanti
- Tipu Sultan Mosque
- The Sword of Tipu Sultan – an Indian TV series on Tipu Sultan
- Tipu's Tiger
- The Dreams of Tipu Sultan by Girish Karnad
- Mir Ghulam Ali, an official and senior military commander

== Cited sources ==
- Brittlebank, Kate (1999). Tipu Sultan's Search for Legitimacy. Delhi: Oxford University Press. ISBN 978-0-19-563977-3. OCLC 246448596.
- Chisholm, Hugh, ed. (1911). "Tippoo Sahib" . Encyclopædia Britannica. Vol. 26 (11th ed.). Cambridge University Press. p. 1005.
- Dalrymple, William (2019). The Anarchy: The Relentless Rise of the East India Company (Hardcover). New York: Bloomsbury publishing. ISBN 978-1-63557-395-4.
- Fernandes, Praxy (1969). Storm over Seringapatam: the incredible story of Hyder Ali & Tippu Sultan. Thackers..
- Habib, Irfan, ed. (2002). Confronting Colonialism: Resistance and Modernization Under Haider Ali and Tipu Sultan (Anthem South Asian Studies). Anthem Press. ISBN 1-84331-024-4.
- Hasan, Mohibbul (2005), History of Tipu Sultan, Aakar Books, ISBN 978-81-87879-57-2
- Knight, Charles (1858). The English cyclopædia: a new dictionary of universal knowledge, Volume 6. Bradbury & Evans..
- Moienuddin, Mohammad (2000). Sunset at Srirangapatam: After the Death of Tipu Sultan. London: Sangam Books. ISBN 978-0-86311-850-0. OCLC 48995204.
- Palsokar, R. D. (1969). Tipu Sultan. s.n..
- Punganuri, Ram Chandra Rao (1849). Memoirs of Hyder and Tippoo: rulers of Seringapatam, written in the Mahratta language. Simkins & Co..
- Parthasarathi, Prasannan (2011). Why Europe Grew Rich and Asia Did Not: Global Economic Divergence, 1600–1850. Cambridge University Press. ISBN 978-1-139-49889-0.
- Prabhu, Alan Machado (1999). Sarasvati's Children: A History of the Mangalorean Christians. I.J.A. Publications. ISBN 978-81-86778-25-8.
- Roy, Kaushik (2011). War, Culture and Society in Early Modern South Asia, 1740–1849. Taylor & Francis. ISBN 978-1-136-79087-4.
- Sastri, K.N.V. (1943). Moral Laws under Tipu Sultan. Indian History Congress.
- Sen, Sailendra Nath (1995). Anglo-Maratha Relations, 1785-96. Popular Prakashan. ISBN 9788171547890.
- Sharma, Hari Dev (1991). The real Tipu: a brief history of Tipu Sultan. Rishi Publications..
- Wenger, Estefania (March 2017). Tipu Sultan: A Biography. Vij Books India Private Limited. ISBN 9789386367440.
