= Hari Pant =

General of the Maratha Empire

Sar-i-Naubat Senapati Haripant Phadke
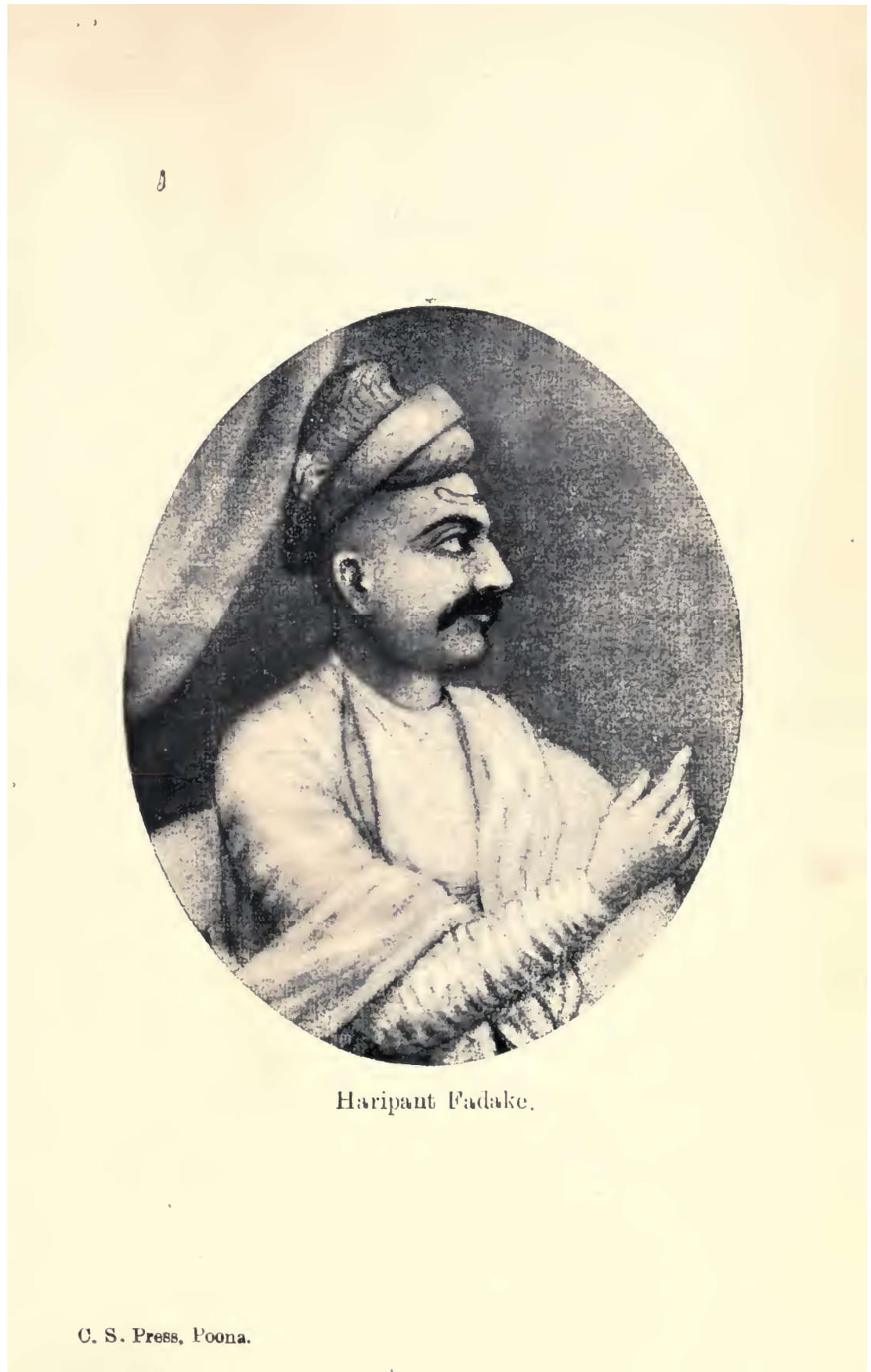
- Posthumous portrait c. 1922
- Born: Haripant Phadke
- Military career
- Allegiance: Maratha Army
- Branch: Cavalry
- Rank: Sar-i-Naubat / Senapati
- Commands: Peshwa's Cavalry
- Conflicts: Maratha–Mysore Wars; First Anglo-Maratha War; Third Anglo-Mysore War

Haripant Phadke, known as Hari Pant was a general of the Maratha Confederacy. Hari Pant became a general during the siege of Badami on 20 May 1786 against the Kingdom of Mysore. He became general of 50,000 and won the war in Maratha-Mysore War.

== Career ==
May,1786- Hari Pant allied with the Nizam of Hyderabad with the army Of 30,000 Maratha cavalry and 20,000 of Nizam's cavalry and soldiers against Tipu Sultan but Tipu Sultan marched towards Adoni and took Adoni Fort by surprise.

September,1786 - Marathas under Hari Pant reached Savanur with lack of food supplies Tipu Sultan reached 5 miles away from Savanur Tipu want a surprise attack on Maratha Army but spies of maratha told this to Hari Pant. Marathas were ready to end this surprise attack. At first, Tipu Sultan did not fire his cannons. So Hari Pant and Marathas thought that Tipu has no long range cannons. So they came near the fort, but then Tipu's Army started firing the cannons on the Maratha Army.

About 7 hours later Marathas retreated on 15 October 1786. Tipu entered city of Savanur.

1 January 1787 - Tipu Sultan once again attacked Maratha Army of Hari Pant Phadke which was stationed in Bahadur Benda near Gajendragad and Koppal.

3 January 1787 - Tipu besieged the fort of Bahadur Benda where Maratha Army stayed. Hari Pant decisively defeated Tipu in this war.

The war ended on 10 February 1787 As Maratha victory. The kingdom of Mysore thus officially became a tributary state to the Maratha Empire. Tipu had to sign a peace agreement with Marathas and focus on British. This war end the Maratha-Mysore War in 1787. Tipu agreed to pay 12 Lakh per year to Marathas as tribute and release Kalopant. Maratha Agreed Tipu Sultan As "Nawab Tipu Sultan". Tipu Wants more focus On British not the Marathas. all territories of Marathas given to Marathas.

He also participated in Third Anglo-Mysore War in 1790 alongside Parasuram Bhau. He won the respect of Nana Fadnavis And Peshwa so he give very large army of Marathas in South India expedition.
