= Battle of Tiruvannamalai =

Part of the First Anglo-Mysore War in 1767

- Part of the First Anglo-Mysore War
| Date | 25 September 1767 |
| Location | South India |
| Result | British victory |

Belligerents
| Sultanate of Mysore | East India Company |

Commanders and leaders
| Hyder Ali | (East India Company) Joseph Smith |

The Battle of Tiruvannamalai is one of the two successful battles fought by the Madras Army in the Carnatic along with the Battle of Chengam. It was fought on 25 September 1767 between the allied forces led by the East India Company against the troops of Hyder Ali. The allied forces of the English army were led by Colonel Smith.

The history of Tiruvannamalai revolves around the Annamalaiyar Temple. The recorded history of the city dates back to the ninth century, as seen from a Chola inscriptions in the temple. After switching hands from various ruling empires like Cholas, Pallavas, Hoysala, Vijayanagar Empire, the town came under the rule of Nawab during the mid of 18th century. Tiruvannamalai was a strategic location between the Northern and Southern Penna rivers. The city was at a strategic crossroads during the Vijayanagara Empire, connecting sacred centers of pilgrimage and military routes.

== Background ==
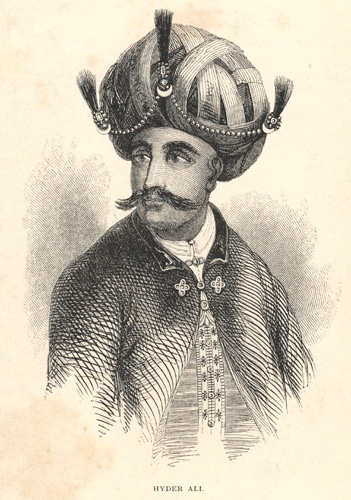
Image of Hyder Ali

The history of Tiruvannamalai revolves around the Annamalaiyar Temple. The recorded history of the city dates back to the ninth century, as seen from a Chola inscriptions in the temple. Further inscriptions made before ninth century indicate the rule of Pallava kings, whose capital was Kanchipuram. The seventh century Nayanar saints Sambandar and Appar wrote of the temple in their poetic work, Tevaram. Sekkizhar, the author of the Periyapuranam records both Appar and Sambandar worshiped Annamalaiyar in the temple. The Chola Kings ruled over the region for more than four centuries, from 850 to 1280, and were temple patrons.

The Hoysala kings used Tiruvannamalai as their capital beginning in 1328 as their empire in Karnataka was annexed by the Delhi Sultanate and fought off the invasions from Madurai Sultans and Sultanate governors in the Deccan until 1346. There are 48 inscriptions from the Sangama Dynasty (1336–1485), two inscriptions from Saluva Dynasty (1485–1505), and 55 inscriptions from Tuluva Dynasty (1505–1571) of the Vijayanagara Empire, reflecting gifts to the temple from their rulers. There are also inscriptions from the rule of Krishnadeva Raya (1509–1529), the most powerful Vijayanagara emperor, indicating further patronage. The city of Tiruvannamalai was at a strategic crossroads during the Vijayanagara Empire, connecting sacred centers of pilgrimage and military routes. There are inscriptions that show the area as an urban center before the precolonial period, with the city developing around the temple, similar to the Nayak ruled cities like Madurai.

== Incidents leading to the war ==
During the early eighteenth century, the entire Indian subcontinent was under the control of the Mughul Empire, however after Bahadur Shah I's death the empire started declining. The empire split among viceroys and other local rulers with bitter fight among each other. In the 1740s and 1750s French and British colonial companies became more active in these local conflicts, and by the Third Carnatic War (1757–1763), the British gained Bombay, Madras, and Calcutta and emerged single largest among other colonial powers. Their eastern holdings at Madras were strongly influenced by treaties with the Nawab of Carnatic, Muhammed Ali Khan Wallajah, whose territory surrounded Madras. The other major powers in the east were the Nizam of Hyderabad, formerly a vassal of the Mughul Empire but declared nominal independence in the 1720s, held in the 1760s by Asaf Jah II, and the Sultanate of Mysore, which occupied the high plains between the Eastern and Western Ghats, the mountain ranges separating the coastal plains of India from the interior. Nominally ruled by the Wodeyar dynasty, control of Mysore had in 1761 come into the hands of Hyder Ali, a Muslim military leader. Each of these powers intrigued with and against the others, and sought to draw the power of the French and British colonial companies to serve their objectives. The colonial powers sought to influence the local powers to gain either direct control of territory, or the revenues from territory nominally controlled by a local ruler beholden to them for financial and military support. Since European military training was significantly better than local practices, small numbers of disciplined European or European-trained forces could defeat significantly larger Indian armies composed mainly of poorly trained infantry and cavalry.

== Battle ==
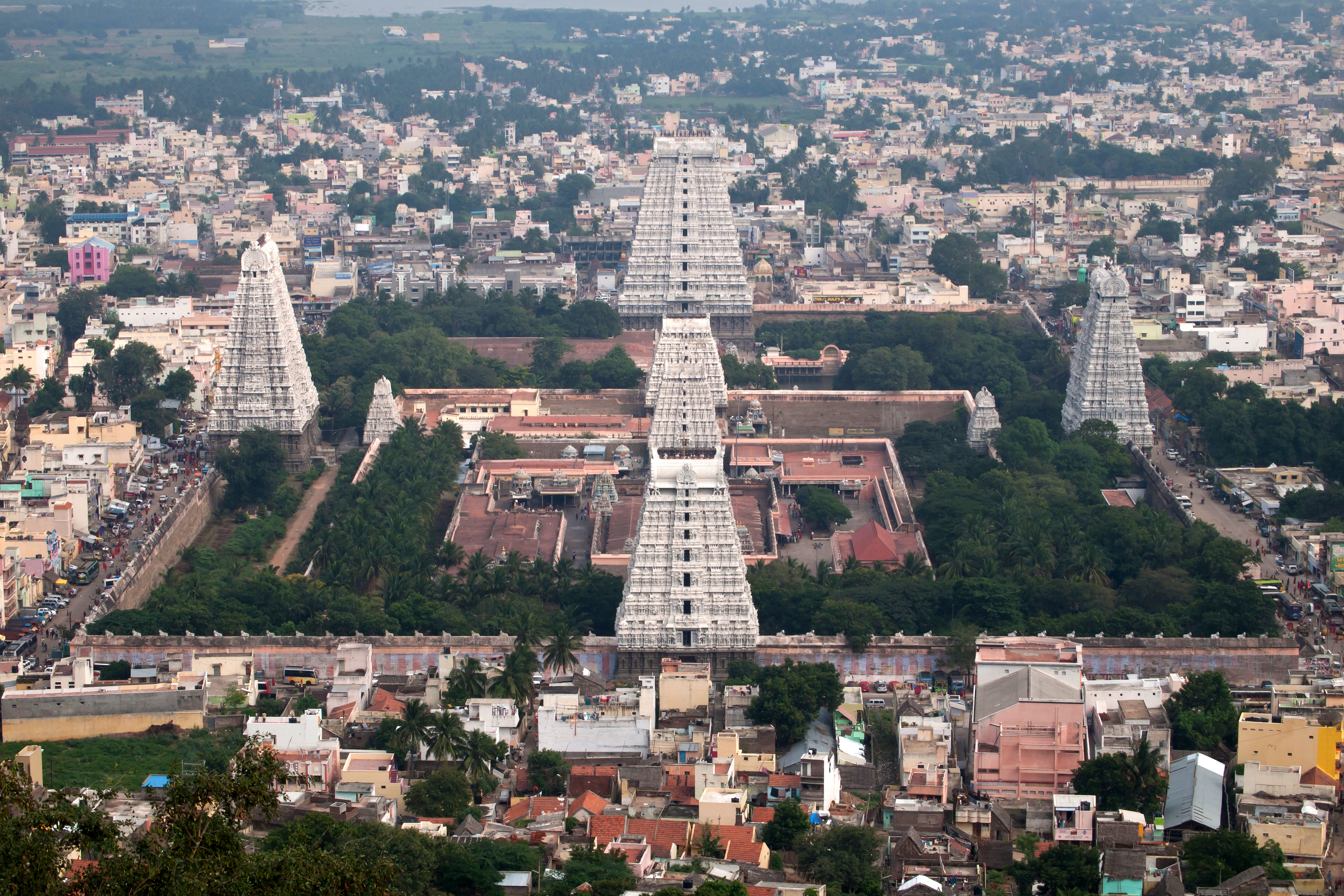
The Annamalaiyar Temple in Tiruvannamalai, around which the history of the city revolves

The Battle of Tiruvannamalai is one of the two successful battles fought by the Madras Army in the Carnatic along with the Battle of Chengam. The allied forces of Hyder Ali were invaded by the British Army under Colonel Smith in Chengam on 3 September 1767. The English Army had an upper hand in the battle. A second battle, the Battle of Tiruvannamalai took place on 25 September 1767 that lasted 2 days.

It was fought on 25 September 1767 between the troops of East India Company and troops of Hyder Ali. The allied forces of the English army was led by Colonel Smith. The Nawab's army lost 4,000 men and 64 guns in the battle. After a brief tussle for a couple of years, Tipu Sultan captured Tiruvannamalai. During the battle, Hyder Ali sent a message to his son Tipu Sultan who was at that time opposed by an English army under Col. Todd and Major Fitzerald. Tipu was successful in meeting and rescuing his father near Vaniyambadi.

After losing the battle, Hyder Ali offered peace with the British Army, which was denied. He then collated all his army and had another fight that led him close to capture of Madras within a distance of 5 miles. The British had a peace treaty during April 1769 with the status quo ante bellum. The treaty also laid terms for mutual aid and end of defensive alliance. During the later period of 1791, the town was raged many times by the British and the Muslim rulers. The British used the temple as a stock house for storing war instruments and canons on account of the impenetrable fort like structure of the temple. Historians believe that the defeats at the Battle of Chengam and the Battle of Tiruvannamalai and further denial of peace by the East India Company, lead to distrust between his son Tipu Sultan and British, which lead to the Anglo-Mysore Wars.
