= Fath Muhammad =

Mughal military commander (1684–1729)

Fateh Muhammad Nadim Sahib
- Naik
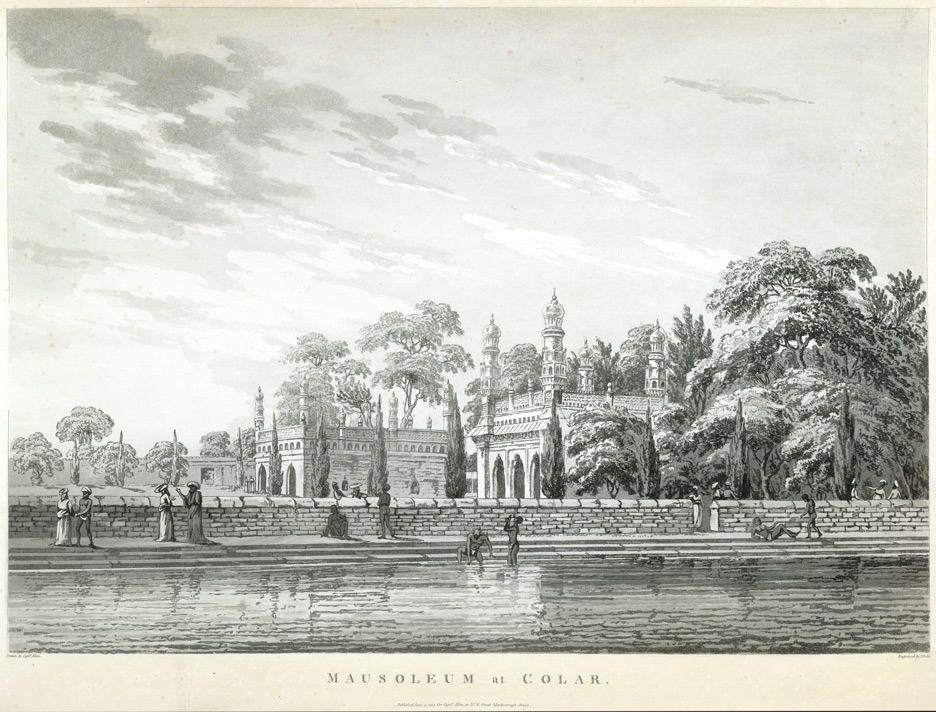
- Sketch of Fateh Muhammad's mausoleum in Kolar.
- Years active: 1697–1729
- Born: 6 May 1684; Doddaballapur, Bijapur Sultanate
- Died: 9 September 1729 (aged 45); Carnatic Sultanate
- Spouse: Razia Bibi
- Children: Hyder Ali; Shahbaz
- Father: Muhammad Ali
- Mother: Sakina Bibi
- Military career
- Allegiance: Mughal Empire
- Branch: Nawab of Carnatic
- Rank: Sepoy
- Conflicts: Mughal-Maratha Wars

Fateh Muhammad or Nadim Sahib (6 May 1684 – 9 September 1729) was an official of the Mughal Empire in Mysore region, and was the father of Mysore Sultanate founder Hyder Ali, who was his fifth child from his third wife, and the paternal grandfather of the Mysore Sultanate Ruler Tipu Sultan.

He was born on 6 May 1684 at Doddallapur in the Bijapur Sultanate, 2 years before the Mughal Empire took control of the region during the reign of Aurangzeb. His father, Muhammad Ali, has been claimed to be a descendant of Sufi mystic Muhammad Bahlol who had married the daughter of custodian of the shrine of Banda Nawaz. He was killed in action at the age of 45 years, 4 months, and 3 days in a battle between Tahir Muhammad Khan, who was the Subahdar of Sira, and Jaher Khan of Chittor on 9 September 1729. He was buried at Kolar alongside his parents.

At an early age, he served as a commander of 50 men in the Rocket artillery of the army of the Nawab of Carnatic. It is believed that he served alongside Zulfiqar Ali Khan, the first Nawab of the Carnatic during the Siege of Jinji. This was maintained under the command of the Mughal Emperor Aurangzeb with the purpose of capturing or killing the renegade Maratha ruler Rajaram. then later in 1700s he became a valuable Military Commander. Fath Muhammad eventually entered the service of the Wodeyar Rajas of the Kingdom of Mysore, where he rose to become a powerful military commander. The Wodeyars awarded him Budikote as a jagir (land grant), where he then served as Naik (Lord).

== See also ==
- Siege of Jinji

== Sources ==
- Narasimha, Roddam; Srinivasan, Jagannathan; Biswas, S. K (2003). The Dynamics of Technology: Creation and Diffusion of Skills and Knowledge. New Delhi: Sage Publications. ISBN 978-0-7619-9670-5. OCLC 231988745.
- Tour, Maistre de la; Mohammed, Gholam (1855). The History of Hyder Shah, Alias Hyder Ali Khan Bahadur. London: W. Thacker. OCLC 65664006.
- Wilks, Mark (1869). Historical Sketches of the South of India, in an Attempt to Trace the history of Mysoor (Second ed.). Madras: Higginbotham. OCLC 460735564.
- Bowring, Lewin (1899). Haidar Alí and Tipú Sultán, and the Struggle with the Musalmán Powers of the South. Oxford: Clarendon Press. OCLC 11827326.
