= Treaty of Madras =

1769 treaty between Mysore and the East India Company

The Treaty of Madras was a peace agreement signed on 29 March 1769 between Mysore and the British (Lord Harry Verelst) East India Company which brought an end to the First Anglo-Mysore War. Fighting had broken out in 1767 and the forces of Hyder Ali had come close to capturing Madras at one point.

The Treaty contained a clause requiring the British to assist Hyder Ali if he was attacked by his neighbours. Hyder felt this agreement was broken when he didn't receive any help when Mysore went to war with the Marathas in 1771. Bad faith arising from the broken clause may have been a reason behind the outbreak of the Second Anglo-Mysore War a decade later.

TERMS:-

1. Tipu sultan's capital Trichonopally and Arcot was treated as secular and neutral places.
