= Siege of Ambur =

1767 siege

- Part of the First Anglo-Mysore War
Date	10 Nov. – 7 Dec. 1767
Location	Ambur, Tamil Nadu, India 12.780°N 78.718°E
Result	British victory

Belligerents
East India Company	Sultanate of Mysore

Commanders and leaders
Harry Calvert	Hyder Ali

The siege of Ambur (10 November – 7 December 1767) was conducted by a combined force of Mysorean and Hyderabadi troops under the command of Hyder Ali against the town of Ambur in southern India during the First Anglo-Mysore War. The town was successfully defended by a garrison of local troops and a small force of British East India Company troops under the command of Captain Calvert.
