= Battle of Ooscota =

1768 battle

- Part of the First Anglo-Mysore War
Date	22–23 August 1768
Location	Hoskote, India 13.07°N 77.8°E
Result	Maratha victory

Belligerents
Maratha Empire	Kingdom of Mysore

Commanders and leaders
(Maratha Empire) Murari Rao	Hyder Ali

Strength
Unknown	Unknown

Casualties and losses
36 killed or wounded	200 killed or wounded

Battle of Ooscota (or Ooscata) was a military engagement fought during the First Anglo-Mysore War, in which the Marathas intervened to aid the British, and in an attempt to reclaim territories previously lost to Mysore.

== Background ==
The British under Colonel Donald Campbell, and the Maratha Empire forces under Murari Rao Ghorpade were under march, and they encamped near Ooscata. The British contingent invited the Maratha to encamp within their defensive lines, but due to the illness of Mohammed Ali, the Nawab of Arcot, Rao declined, and they threw up their own picket a short distance away. Meanwhile, Hyder Ali was nearby and decided to attack the Maratha forces in the night.

== Battle ==
The Mysorean cavalry attacked behind Hyder Ali's war elephants, which successfully ambushed the Maratha defenders, breaking through the camp’s defenses. Rao instructed his cavalrymen to remain unmounted, so that his forces could bring down any mounted troops; knowing them to be enemy. In the chaos, Rao's state elephant broke loose, and wielding its chain as a weapon, threw back the cavalry in the face of the supporting infantry. Disheartened, the Mysorean troops retreated, with a loss of some 200 troops compared to the Maratha losses of just 36.

As the British had been alerted and were advancing to relieve the Maratha, Hyder Ali decided against further attacks.

The British lost Cambell's aide de camp, Gee who had ridden to the Maratha camp to investigate, and been shot down under Rao's blanket orders to kill mounted men.
