= Budikote =

Budikote Vibhutipura
- village
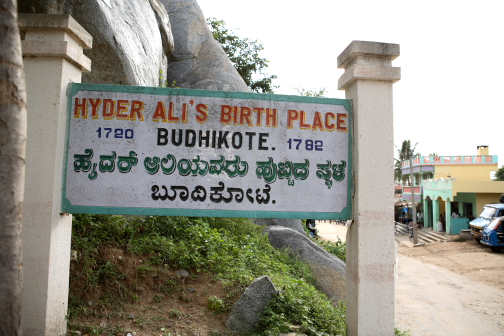
- Birth place of Hyder Ali at Budikote fort

- Location in Karnataka, India Budikote (India)
- Coordinates: 12°54′N 78°08′E
- Country: India
- State: Karnataka
- District: Kolar

Government
  - Type: Panchayati raj
  - Body: Gram panchayat

Area
  - Total: 355.65 ha (878.8 acres)

Population (2011)
  - Total: 3,347
  - Density: 941.1/km^{2} (2,437/sq mi)

Languages
- Time zone: UTC+5:30 (IST)
- Postal code: 563114
- ISO 3166 code: IN-KA
- Vehicle registration: KA
- Website: karnataka.gov.in

Budikote or Budhikote is a village situated in Bangarapet taluk of Kolar district in the Indian state of Karnataka. It is located about 15 mi (24 km) from the district headquarters Kolar Gold Fields, the nearest city; Bangarpet the nearest town is 12 km (7.5 mi) away and Bangalore is 125 km (78 mi). It is a gram panchayat and covers an area of 355.65 ha (878.8 acres). According to the 2011 census data, Budikote village has a population of 3,347—of which 1,743 are male and 1,604 are female—and a household count of 600.

An inscription found in the village dates to the 8th-century Bana kingdom. The village was the birthplace of Hyder Ali, a ruler of the kingdom of Mysore and military commander of Karnataka who fought against the British in their struggle for supremacy in South India. A memorial stone at the fort here honours him.

== Geography ==
The village of Budikote is situated at the confluence of the two branches of the Markanda River, a tributary of the Pinaknin River. One originates from southwest of Vokkaleru hills, while the other rises in the Tyakal hills. The two join to the southeast of Budikote and finally flow into the South Pennar River. Budikote is the headquarters of the Bangarpet taluk.

== History ==
Budikote, meaning "fort of ashes" when translated literally and known in ancient times as Vibhutipura, is said to have derived its name from a catastrophe that occurred here in the remote past. Its hoary past is also attributed to an inscription found here, dated to the 8th-century, that belonged to the period of the Bana kingdom of South India. There are also inscriptions which in the nearby Ukkunda village records that Budikote was part of Tekal province and was under the rule of several chieftains.

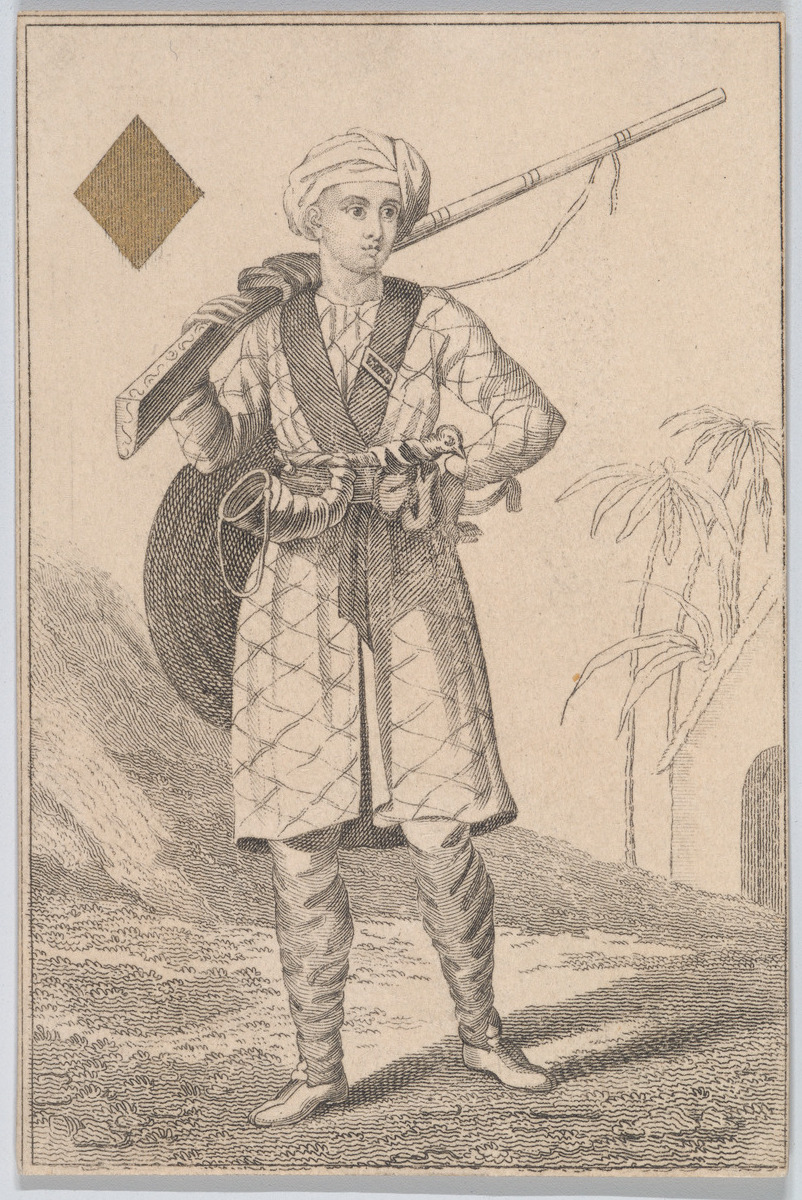
Hyder Ali as a young soldier.

Budikote is famous for being the birthplace of Hyder Ali (1720–1782), a Muslim ruler of Mysore kingdom and father of Tipu Sultan. Ali was a military commander of Karnataka in the wars against the British Raj in southern India in the mid-18th century.

The village has been written about by English poet E. M. Jones who stayed in Budikote during a visit in 1927, in his "Poems of South India", "Old Fort of Budikote", and "Indian Landscape".

== Landmarks ==
The Budikote Fort has a stone inscription which records it as the location where Hyder Ali was born. The fort, under the jurisdiction of the Archaeological Survey of India, is reportedly ill-maintained.

As a religious centre, Budikote had ancient temples located in the fort dedicated to Sugriva, Hanuman, Venkateswara and Venugoplaswamy, which are now dilapidated. There are also functioning temples dedicated to Lord Kodandarama and Lord Someshwara.

The Markandeya reservoir, created by the Budikote dam, is located in the peripheral area of the village. The reservoir was constructed between 1936 and 1940 at a cost of ₹4 lakh (equivalent to ₹13 crore or US$1.3 million in 2023). The Budikote dam is located 125 km (78 mi) from Bangalore and serves eight villages.

== Media ==
Namma Dhwani (transl. Our Voices) is a radio station and community media partnership between the community of Budikote, NGO's Voices, and MYRADA, with support from UNESCO who laid cables and sold subsidised radios. It was established in 2002. It started cablecasting programmes on a daily basis for one hour daily in the morning and evening. It was established as a cable radio service because the Government of India has prohibited communities from using the airwaves. The station plays a role in promoting rural communication and educating villagers on topics regarding agriculture, health, education and law.
