= Hyder Ali =

Sultan of Mysore from 1761 to 1782

- Nawab of Mysore; Sarvadhikari of Mysore; Dalavayi of Mysore; Shams-ul-Mulk; Amir-ud-Daulah
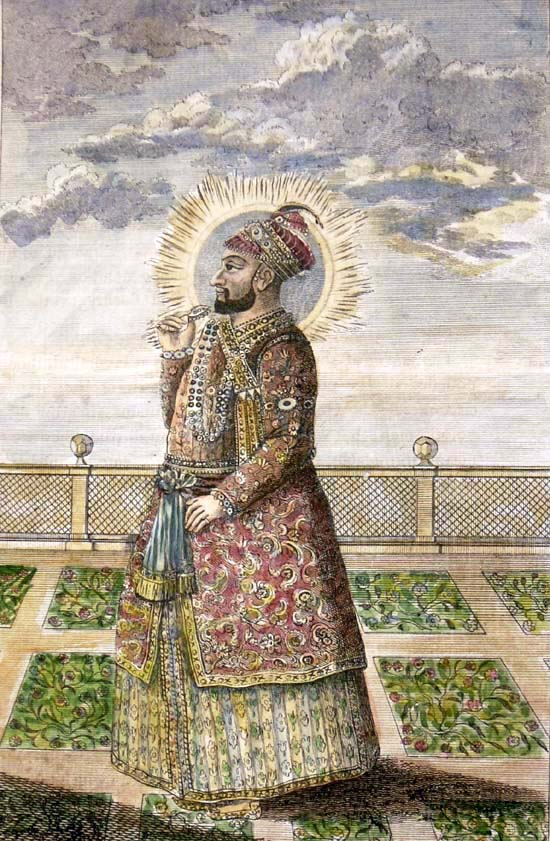
- A 1790's steel engraving of King Hyder Ali

Sultan of Mysore
- Reign: July 1761 – 7 December 1782
- Predecessor: Krishnaraja Wodeyar II (as Maharaja)
- Successor: Tipu Sultan
- Born: c.1720 Budikote, Kingdom of Mysore (present-day Kolar, Karnataka, India)
- Died: 7 December 1782 (aged 62); Chittoor, Sultanate of Mysore (present-day Andhra Pradesh, India)
- Burial: Srirangapatna, Karnataka; 12°24′36″N 76°42′50″E
- Spouse: Fathima Fakhr-un-Nisa
- House: Mysore
- Father: Fath Muhammad
- Mother: Razia Bibi
- Religion: Sunni Islam
- Military career
- Allegiance: Hyderabad State; Carnatic Sultanate; Kingdom of Mysore; Sultanate of Mysore
- Branch: Mysorean Army
- Rank: Sultan; Nawab (formerly); Ispahsalar (formerly); Nayak (formerly); Sipahi (formerly)
- Commands: List: Dindigul; Bangalore; Srirangapatna; Mysore
- Conflicts: List: Mughal-Maratha Wars; Carnatic Wars; Seven Years' War; Mysore's campaigns against the states of Malabar (1757); Mysorean invasion of Kerala; Maratha–Mysore War; Battle of Jadi Hanwati; First Anglo-Mysore War; Battle of Ooscota; Second Anglo-Mysore War; Mysore invasion of Chirakkal; Siege of Nargund; Siege of Channapatna; Battle of Rattihalli; Capture of Kabbaldurga

Hyder Ali (Haidar'alī; حيدرعلى; Kannada: [hɐi̯d̪ɐr ɐliː] c. 1720 – 7 December 1782), historical anglicized spelling Hyde Ally Cawn, was the sultan and de facto ruler of the Sultanate of Mysore in southern India. He distinguished himself as a soldier, eventually drawing the attention of Mysore's rulers. Rising to the post of Dalavayi (commander-in-chief) to Krishnaraja Wodeyar II, he came to dominate the titular monarch and the Mysore government. He became the de facto ruler of Mysore as Sarvadhikari (Chief Minister) by 1761, and served as its primary military leader in intermittent conflicts against the East India Company during the first and second Anglo-Mysore wars.

Hyder Ali concluded an alliance with the French, and used the services of French workmen in raising his artillery and arsenal. His rule of Mysore was characterised by frequent warfare with his neighbours and rebellion within his territories. This was not unusual for the time, as much of the Indian subcontinent was then in turmoil. He was known to American politician Benjamin Franklin for his bravery.

Hyder Ali left his eldest son, Tipu Sultan, an extensive kingdom bordered by the Krishna River in the north, the Eastern Ghats in the east and the Arabian Sea in the west.

== Early life ==
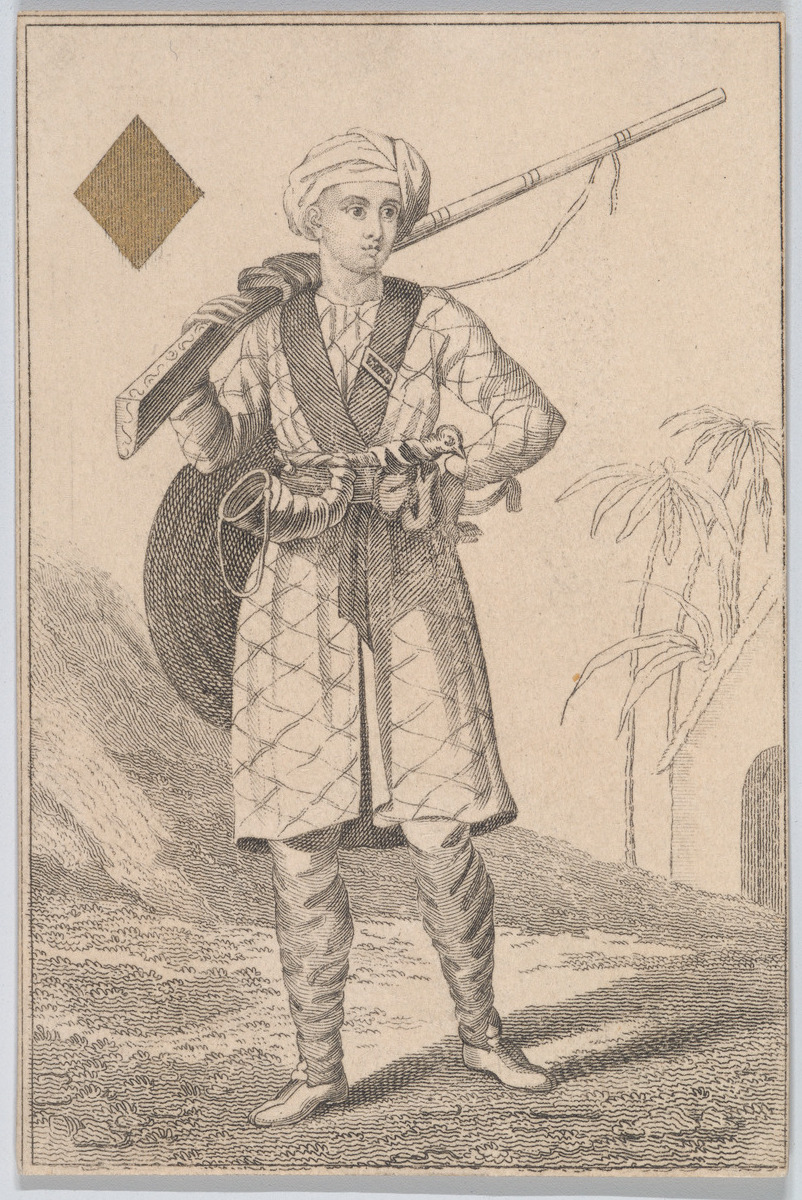
Hyder Ali as a young soldier (Sepoy).

The exact date of Hyder Ali's birth is not known with certainty. Various historical sources provide dates ranging between 1717 and 1722 for his birth. His father, Fath Muhammad, was born in Kolar, and served as a commander of 50 men in the bamboo rocket artillery (mainly used for signalling) in the army of the Nawab of Carnatic. Fath Muhammad eventually entered the service of the Wodeyar rajas of the Kingdom of Mysore, where he rose to become a powerful military commander. The Wodeyars awarded him Budikote as a jagir (land grant), where he then served as naik (lord). Hyder Ali was born in Budikote, modern day Kolar district, Karnataka; he was Fath Muhammad's fifth child, and the second by his third wife Razia Bibi, a sister of sufi pir Ibrahim Saheb whose ancestors were Arab Nawayath. According to some historians Fath Muhammad was also of Arab ancestry. According to this tradition, his paternal ancestors were too Nawayath Arabs from the Quraysh tribe, who arrived in India by sea and later came to southern India from Delhi during the reign of Muhammad Adil Shah, or settled in Punjab before moving to southern India. According to another set of historians, Hyder Ali was of Punjabi descent. As per this tradition, his father descended from a Sufi mystic Shah Bahlol through Muhammad Ali. Muhammad Ali was the husband of the daughter of the Banda Nawaz shrine's custodian in Gulbarga.

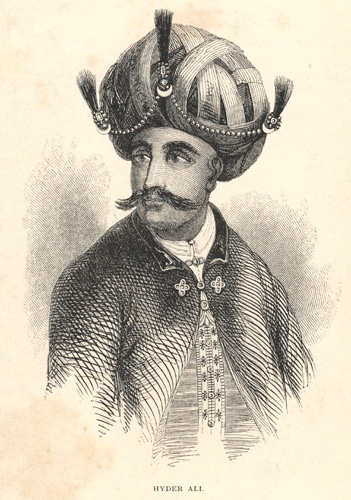
Realistic portrait of Hyder Ali

Early years of Hyder Ali are not well documented; he entered military service along with his brother Shahbaz after their father died in combat. Although Hyder Ali was from Mysore, his early loyalties were to the Nizam of Hyderabad, through whom Hyder Ali and his companions became sepoys in the Deccan with partial investiture from the "Great Moghul" of that period. After serving for a number of years under the rulers of Arcot, they came to Srirangapatna, where Hyder's uncle served. He introduced them to Devaraja, the dalwai (chief minister, military leader, and Commander-in-chief) of Krishnaraja Wodeyar II, and Nanjaraja, Devaraja's brother, who also held important ministerial posts including sarvadhikari. Hyder and his brother were both given commands in the Mysorean army; Hyder served under Shahbaz, commanding 100 cavalry and 2,000 infantry.

== Rise to power ==
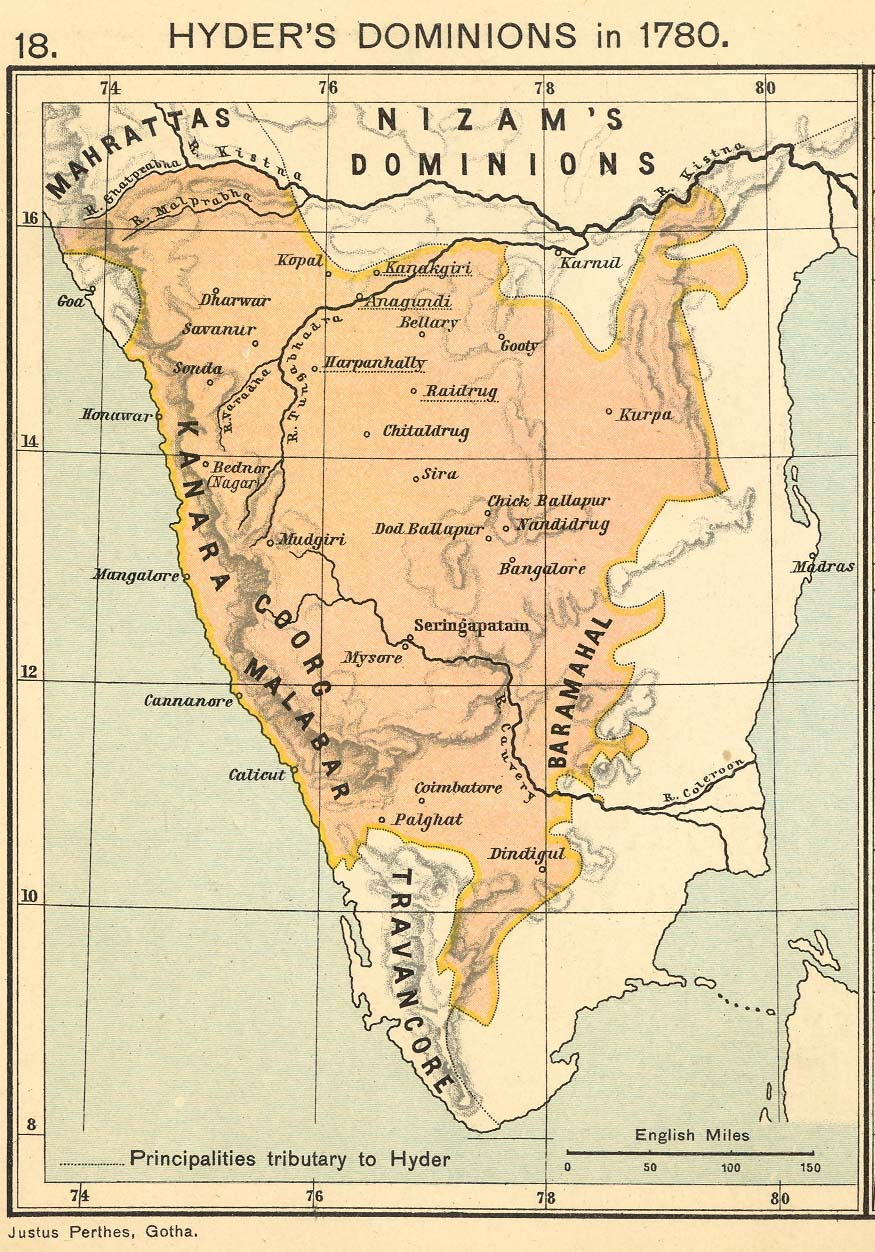
The dominions of the Kingdom Of Mysore ruled by Hyder Ali, in the year 1780.

=== Carnatic Wars ===
In 1748, Qamar-ud-din Khan, Asaf Jah I, the longtime Nizam of Hyderabad, died. The struggle to succeed him is known as the Second Carnatic War. On one side was Nasir Jung, the Nizam and his protege Muhammad Ali, supported by the British, and on the other was Chanda Sahib and Nasir Jung's nephew Muzaffar Jung, supported by the French, vying to become the Nawab of Arcot. Both sides were supported by other local leaders.

Devaraja had started vesting more military authority in his brother, and in 1749 Nanjaraja marched the Mysorean army in support of Nasir Jung. The army went to Devanhalli, where the Mysoreans participated in the Siege of Devanahalli Fort. The fort was held by Muzaffar Jung's forces and the siege was conducted by the Marquis de Bussy. During the successful eight-month siege, Hyder Ali and his brother distinguished themselves, and were rewarded by Devaraja with enlarged commands.

In the wars against Hyder Ali in 1751 and during the siege of Tiruchirappalli in 1752, Thondaiman sent 400 cavalry and 3000 Kallar infantry to Tiruchirappalli to support the British and the Nawab of Arcot.

By 1755, Hyder Ali commanded 3,000 infantry and 1,500 cavalry, and was reported to be enriching himself on campaigns by plunder. In that year, he was also appointed Faujdar (military commander) of Dindigul. In this position, he first retained French advisers to organise and train his artillery companies. He is also known to have personally served alongside de Bussy, and is believed to have met both Muzaffar Jung and Chanda Shahib.

In these early wars he also came to dislike and mistrust Muhammed Ali Khan Wallajah, the Nawab of the Carnatic. In fact, Muhammed Ali Khan Wallajah and the Mysorean leaders were long at odds with each other, seeking territorial gains at the other's expense. Muhammad Ali Khan Wallajah had by then formed an alliance with the British, and he was accused by Hyder Ali in later years of effectively preventing him from making any sort of long-lasting alliances or agreements with the British.

Throughout the Carnatic Wars, Hyder Ali and his Mysore battalions served alongside French commanders such as Joseph Francois Dupleix, Count de Lally and de Bussy; he also assisted Chanda Sahib on various occasions. Hyder Ali supported the claims of Muzaffar Jung and later sided with Salabat Jung.

=== Skills ===
Early in his career, Hyder Ali retained, as one of his chief financial assistants, a Brahmin named Khande Rao. Hyder Ali, who was illiterate, was reported to be blessed with a prodigious memory and numerical acumen.

Hyder Ali could rival or outperform expert accountants with his great arithmetic skills and worked to develop a system, with Rao, that included checks and balances, so that all manner of income, including plunder of physical goods of all types, could be accounted for with little possibility of fraud or embezzlement.

This financial management may have played a role in Hyder Ali's rise in power.

=== Control of Srirangapatna ===
In 1757, Hyder Ali was called to Srirangapatna to support Devaraja against threats from Hyderabad and the Marathas. Upon his arrival, he found the Mysorean army in disarray and near mutiny over pay. While Devaraja bought his way out of the threats to Srirangapatna, Hyder Ali arranged for the army to be paid and arrested the ringleaders of the mutiny.

=== Campaigns against Calicut ===
In 1757, to resist the invasion of the Zamorin of Calicut – an East India Company ally at the time, the Palakkad Raja sought the help of Hyder Ali. Hyder Ali then led campaigns against the Zamorin of Calicut in the Malabar Coast of India. In 1766, Hyder Ali defeated the Zamorin of Kozhikode and absorbed Kozhikode into his state. The smaller princely states in northern and north-central parts of modern-day state of Kerala (Malabar region) including Kolathunadu, Kottayam, Kadathanadu, Kozhikode, Tanur, Valluvanad, and Palakkad were unified under the rulers of Mysore and were made a part of the larger Kingdom of Mysore. For his role in these activities, Hyder Ali was rewarded by Devaraja with the jaghir (regional governorship) of Bangalore.

=== Capture of Bangalore (1758) ===
In 1758, Hyder Ali successfully forced the Marathas to lift a siege of Bangalore. Hyder Ali's forces entered the city, thus capturing it.

By 1759, Hyder Ali was in command of the entire Mysorean army.

=== Siege of Channapatna (1759) ===
In the year 1759, Balaji Baji Rao launched a military expedition against Bangalore and Channapatna, with Gopal Hari and Anand Rao leading the forces. However, Hyder Ali managed to defeat the much larger Maratha army with a smaller force. As a result, Channapatna and the surrounding districts were incorporated into the Mysore territory.

=== Nawab of Mysore (1759) ===
The young King of Mysore, Krishnaraja Wodeyar II, rewarded Hyder Ali's performance by granting him the title of Fath Hyder Bahadur or Nawab Hyder Ali Khan. Hyder Ali is also known to be the first ruler of Mysore to be granted the title of Nawab; thus, it can be said that he was briefly the "Nawab of Mysore" by 1759.

Because of the ongoing conflicts with the Marathas, the Mysorean treasury was virtually bankrupted, prompting the queen mother to force into exile Nanjaraj, who had assumed the position of dalwai upon his brother's death in 1758. Hyder Ali was a beneficiary of this action, rising in influence in the court.

=== Deposition of Khande Rao ===
In 1760, the queen mother conspired with Khande Rao, who had gone into the raja's service, to oust Hyder Ali. He was precipitously forced out of Seringapatam, leaving his family, including his son Tipu Sultan, under house arrest.

The sudden departure left Hyder Ali with few resources. He may have been fortuitously aided at this time by the faraway Third Battle of Panipat, in which the Marathas suffered a major defeat on 14 January 1761. Because of this loss, the Marathas withdrew forces from Mysore and Hyder Ali's brother-in-law Makdum Ali chased them into Bidnur and Sunda.

Hyder Ali soon consolidated his strength by placing Mirza Sahib as the commander of Sira, a Sufi Pir Ibrahim Sahib (maternal uncle of Hyder Ali) in Bangalore and Amin Sahib, his cousin in Basnagar. Soon afterward, Hyder Ali marched alongside Makdum Ali's forces, which numbered about 6,000, along with the 3,000 men from his garrison at Bangalore, toward Seringapatam.

They clashed with Khande Rao's forces before reaching the capital. Khande Rao, with 11,000 men, won the battle, and Hyder Ali was forced to apply to the exiled Nanjaraj for support. Nanjaraj gave Hyder Ali command of his army and the title of Dalwai.

With this force, Hyder Ali again moved out against Khande Rao. Hyder Ali sent letters appearing to be from Nanjaraj to some of Khande Rao's commanders, confirming their agreement to hand Khande Rao over to Hyder Ali. Fearing a conspiracy, Khande Rao fled into Seringapatam.

After a minor battle against the now-leaderless army, Hyder Ali took over most of its remnants and surrounded Seringapatam. The ensuing negotiations left Hyder Ali in nearly complete military control of Mysore. Concessions that he extracted included the surrender of Khande Rao, who Hyder Ali imprisoned in Bangalore.

== Ruler of Mysore ==
Hyder Ali became king of Mysore in 1761 after overthrowing the prime minister and making the king, Krishnaraja Wodeyar II, a prisoner in his own palace.

Hyder Ali formally styled himself Sultan Hyder Ali Khan in his correspondence with the Mughal Emperor Shah Alam II. Hyder Ali retained his title during the first Anglo-Mysore War that raged in 1766, and onwards.

He was very cautious in his diplomacy with the Nizam of Hyderabad, who was, according to an official Mughal firman, the sovereign of all Muslim-ruled territories in southern India.

The English and the Marathas continued to refer to Hyder Ali and later his son Tipu Sultan as "nabobs".

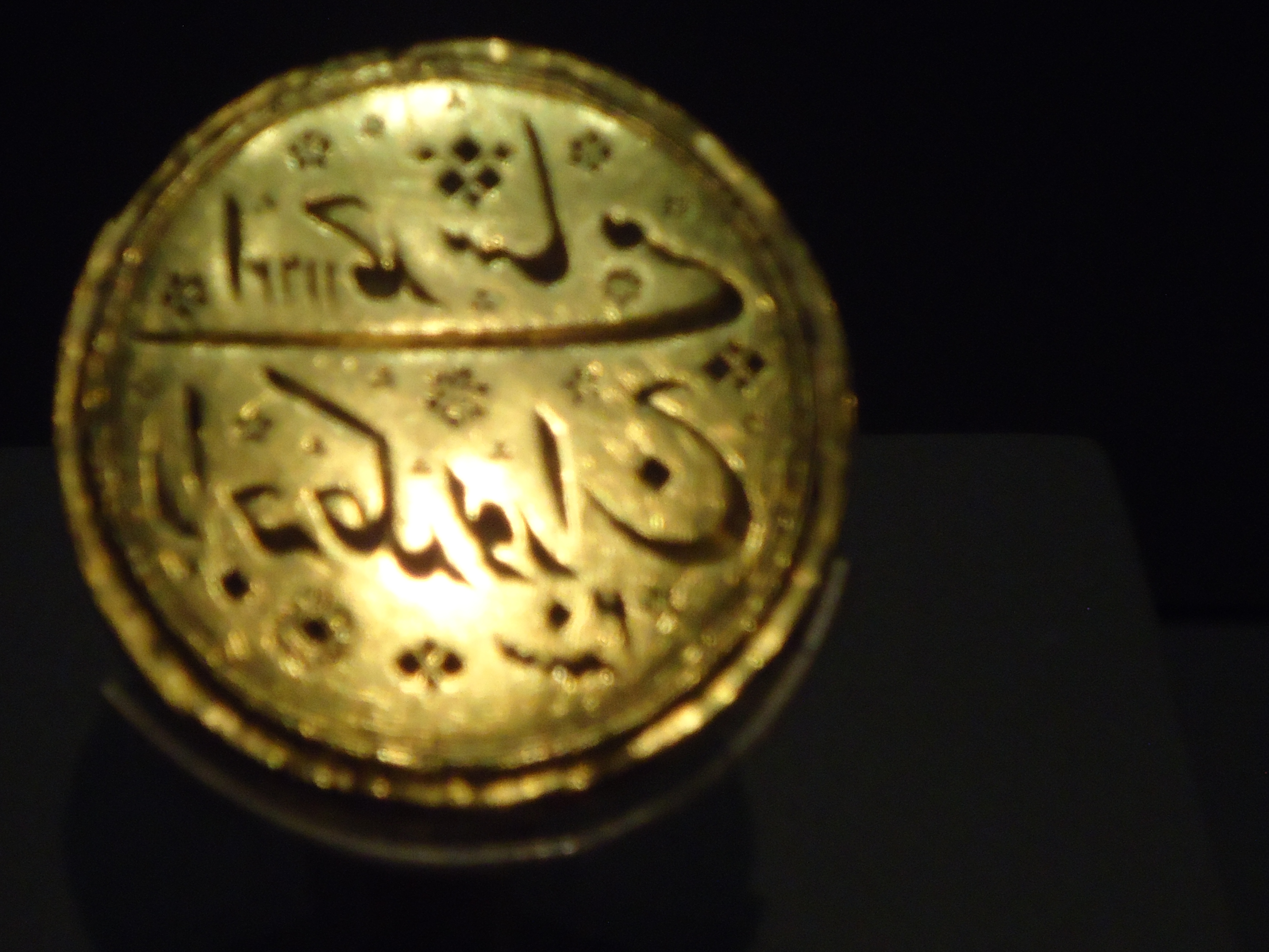
Seal of Mysore.

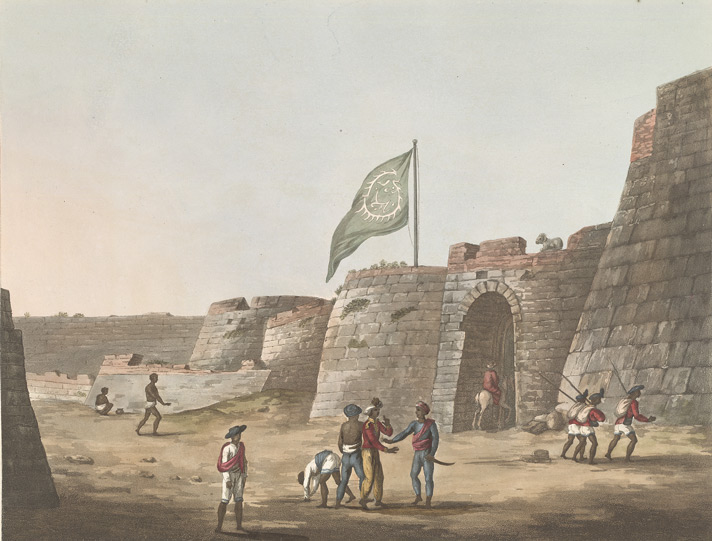
The flag of the Sultanate of Mysore at the entrance into the fort of Bangalore.

=== Expansion and alliances ===
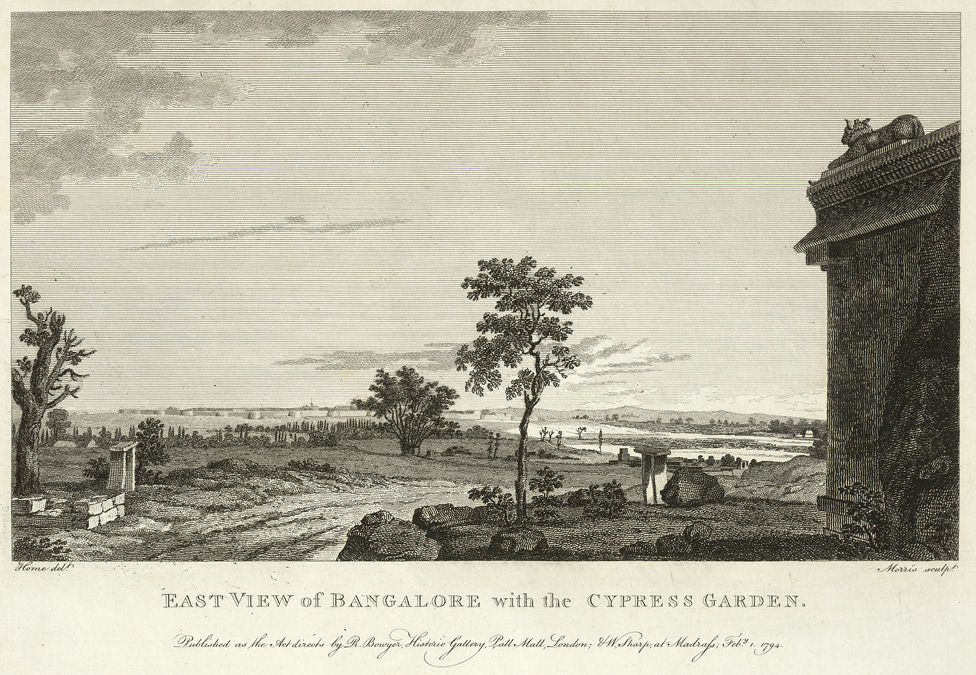
Lal Bagh Gardens of Bangalore were originally laid out by Hyder Ali and were modelled on Mughal and French gardening techniques.

Over the next few years Hyder expanded his territories to the north. Two key acquisitions were Sira, taken from the Marathas, and the kingdom of Bednore, where as a casus belli he agreed to support a claimant to its throne against usurpers. In 1763 he took its capital, Ikkeri, which included a large treasury. He renamed the capital Haidernagar, and began styling himself Hyder Ali Khan Bahadur, a title that had been bestowed on him by Salabat Jung as reward for his taking of Sira. He moved most of his family to Ikkeri, a natural fortress, in the hopes that it would "serve him for a safe refuge". He assumed the trappings of the ruler of Bednore, began issuing coins, and established a system of weights and measures. He made sure his son Tipu received a quality education, "employing learned tutors" and "appointing a suitable hand of attendants" to see to his upbringing. He cultivated a suspicion of foreigners, specifically refusing to allow the East India Company to have a resident at his court. His security, however, was not assured in Bednore: a bout of illness and a widespread conspiracy against him convinced him that it would not make an ideal capital for his domain, and he returned to Mysore.

The taking of Bednore included several ports on the Malabar coast, including Mangalore. Hyder used these ports to establish a small navy. The documentary record on the navy is fragmentary; Portuguese records indicate that the fleet was launched sometime between 1763 and 1765. It was apparently officered by Europeans, and its first admiral was an Englishman; by 1768 its admiral was a Mysorean cavalry officer named Ali Bey (or Lutf Ali Beg), apparently chosen by Hyder because he did not trust the European captains.

Hyder had amicable relations with the Christian population in Mangalore, which had long been under Portuguese influence and had a sizeable Roman Catholic population, and with Christians in general. He had a very close friendship with two Goan Catholic clergymen, Bishop Noronha and Fr. Joachim Miranda, and allowed a Protestant missionary to live at his court. Hyder's army also included Catholic soldiers, and he allowed Christians to build a church at Seringapatam, where French generals used to offer prayers and priests used to visit. Mangalorean historian A. L. P. D'Souza mentions that Hyder also had Christians in his administration. Pursuant to treaties concluded with the Portuguese, he also allowed Portuguese priests to settle disputes among Christians. However, many Mangaloreans (not just Christians) disliked him for the heavy tax burden he imposed on them.

== Hyder Ali attacks the Maratha Confederacy ==
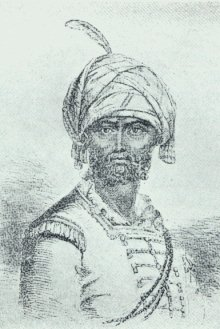
Hyder Ali in 1762, incorrectly described as the head of his army in the war against the British in India. (French painting)

The Maratha Confederacy had just been routed at the Third Battle of Panipat by Ahmad Shah Durrani and the Mughals had been restored in the year 1761.

The Maratha Empire was very vulnerable and feeble to any attack and the Peshwa's power had been almost eliminated in all of Northern India.

At this point in his life Hyder Ali decided to go to war with the Marathas and put an end to the threat they posed to his power.

He therefore attacked the Maratha-aligned Rani of Bednore. She had appealed to the Nawab of Savanur for assistance when Hyder invaded. Hyder consequently threatened the Nawab, attempting to extort tribute from him. Failing in this, he overran that territory, reaching as far as Dharwad, north of the Tungabhadra River.

Since Savanur was a tributary of the Marathas, the Peshwa, Madhavrao I, countered with a strong force and defeated Hyder near Rattihalli and in decisive Battle of Jadi Hanwati . Following the victory the Marathas restored their power under the reign of Madhavrao Peshwa. The Maratha victory forced Hyder to retreat; he had to abandon Bednore, although he was able to remove its treasures to Seringapatam. Hyder paid 35 lakhs rupees in tribute to end the war, and returned most of his gains, although he did retain Sira.

In 1766 Hyder Ali returned to the Malabar, this time at the invitation of the raja of Cannanore, who sought independence from the Zamorin, the ruler of Calicut who held sway over Cannanore. Hyder also claimed a debt of tribute from the Zamorin, who had supported Hyder's opponents in earlier campaigns. After a difficult campaign, Hyder reached Calicut, where the Zamorin, after promising to make payment, failed to deliver. Hyder placed the Zamorin under house arrest and had his finance minister tortured. Fearing similar treatment, the Zamorin set fire to his palace and perished in the flames, ending Eradi dynastic rule of Calicut. After establishing control of Calicut, Hyder departed, but was forced to return several months later when the Nairs rebelled against the rule of his lieutenant, Reza Sahib. Hyder's response was harsh: after putting down the rebellion, many rebels were executed, and thousands of others were forcibly relocated to the Mysorean highlands.

Map of India in 1765 showing Hindu territories allied with the Marathas in (yellow); and the Muslim territories, which includes Mysore allied to the Mughal in (green).

Mysore's titular ruler Krishnaraja died in April 1766, while Hyder was in Malabar. Hyder had left orders that Krishnaraja's son Nanjaraja Wodeyar be invested should that happen, and he only later came to formally pay his respects to the new rajah. He took advantage of this opportunity to engage in a sort of house cleaning: the raja's palace was plundered, and its staff reduced to the point where virtually everyone employed there was also a spy for Hyder Ali.

== First Anglo-Mysore War ==
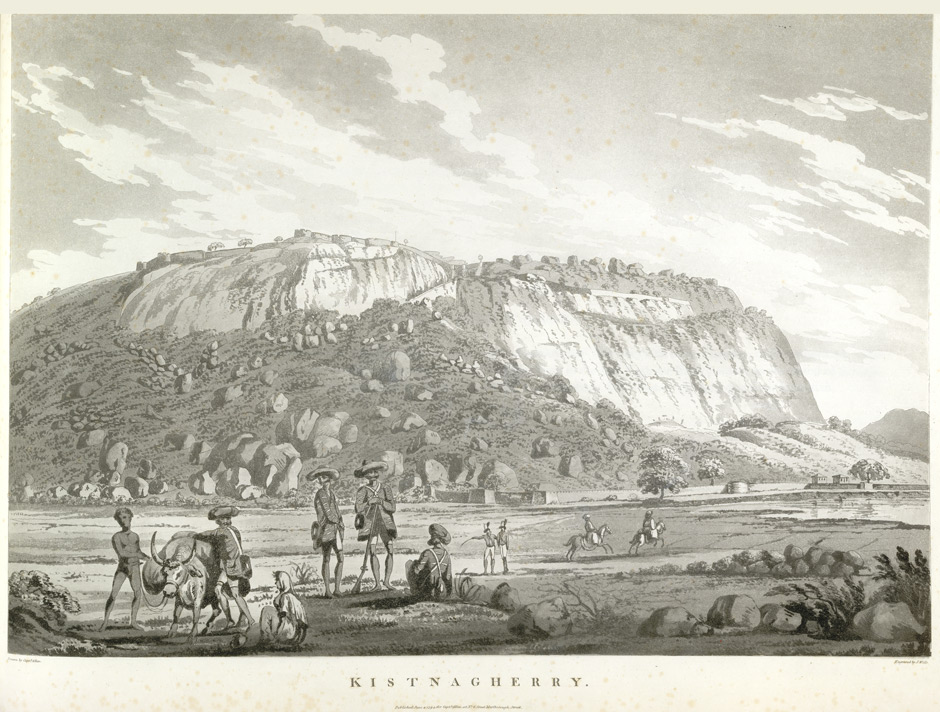
Krishnagiri Fort was besieged in the first Anglo-Mysore war in 1768, and finally surrendered to the English, who held it briefly

After the Battle of Buxar, the British, led by Hector Monro, decided to support the Maratha Confederacy against the Shah Alam II, the Nawabs and Mysore.

As the power struggle between Mysore and the Peshwa continued it soon began to involve the British and other European trading companies.

Being himself a former ally of the French, Hyder Ali expected the support of the British against the Marathas, but such support never materialized.

In 1766 Mysore began to become drawn into territorial and diplomatic disputes between the Nizam of Hyderabad and the East India Company, which had by then become the dominant European power on the Eastern Indian coast. The Nizam, seeking to deflect the company from their attempts to gain control of the Northern Circars, made overtures to Hyder Ali to launch an invasion of the Carnatic. Company representatives also appealed to Hyder Ali, but he rebuffed to them. The Nizam then ostensibly struck a deal with the Company administration in the Madras Presidency for their support, but apparently did so with the expectation that when Hyder Ali was prepared for war, the deal with the British would be broken. This diplomatic manoeuvring resulted in the start of the First Anglo-Mysore War in August 1767 when a company outpost at Changama was attacked by a combined Mysore-Hyderabad army under Hyder Ali's command. Despite significantly outnumbering the British force (British estimates place the allied army size at 70,000 to the British 7,000), the allies were repulsed with heavy losses. Hyder Ali moved on to capture Kaveripattinam after two days of siege, while the British commander at Changama, Colonel Joseph Smith, eventually retreated to Tiruvannamalai for supplies and reinforcements. There Hyder Ali was decisively repulsed on 26 September 1767. With the onset of the monsoon season, Hyder Ali opted to continue campaigning rather than adopting the usual practice of suspending operations because of the difficult conditions the weather created for armies. After over-running a few lesser outposts, he besieged Ambur in November 1767, forcing the British to resume campaigning. The British garrison commander refused large bribes offered by Hyder Ali in exchange for surrender, and the arrival of a relief column in early December forced Hyder Ali to lift the siege. He retreated northward, covering the movements of the Nizam's forces, but was disheartened when an entire corps of European cavalry deserted to the British. The failures of this campaign, combined with successful British advances in the Northern Circars and secret negotiations between the British and the Nizam Asaf Jah II, led to a split between Hyder Ali and the Nizam. The latter withdrew back to Hyderabad and eventually negotiated a new treaty with the British company in 1768. Hyder Ali, apparently seeking an end to the conflict, made peace overtures to the British, but was rebuffed.

In early 1768, the Bombay Presidency in Bombay organised an expedition to Mysore's Malabar coast territories. Hyder Ali's fleet, which the British reported as numbering about ten ships, deserted en masse, apparently because the captains were unhappy with the oustering of their British admirals and some even demanded the return of Ali Raja Kunhi Amsa II, but Hyder Ali chose a cavalry commander Lutf Ali Beg as fleet commander. Owing to a British bluff, Lutf Ali Beg also withdrew much of the Mangalore garrison to move on what he perceived to be the British target, Onore. The British consequently captured Mangalore with minimal opposition in February. This activity, combined with the loss of the Nizam as an ally, prompted Hyder Ali to withdraw from the Carnatic, and move with speed to Malabar. Dispatching his son Tipu with an advance force, Hyder Ali followed, and eventually re-took Mangalore and the other ports held by the over-extended British forces. He also levied additional taxes as punishment against local malabari Nair chieftains which were then stripped of rights and authority.

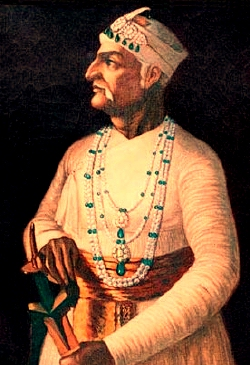
Asaf Jah II opposed the East India Company in 1766, and initially allied himself with Hyder Ali during the First Anglo-Mysore War, particularly during the Battle of Chengam, then Battle of Rakshasbhuvan, but later abandoned (in 1768) and later intervened in favor of Mysore during the Battle of Kharda in 1795.

After his reconquest, Hyder Ali learned that the Mangalorean Catholics had helped the British in their conquest of Mangalore, behaviour he considered treasonous. He summoned a Portuguese officer and several Christian priests from Mangalore to suggest an appropriate punishment to impose on the Mangalorean Catholics for their treachery. The Portuguese officer suggested the death penalty for those Catholics who helped the British as a typical punishment for the betrayal of one's sovereign in Catholic nations. But Hyder Ali exhibited a diplomatic stance and instead imprisoned those Christians who were condemned for treachery. He afterwards opened negotiations with the Portuguese, and reached an agreement with them that removed suspicion from the clergy and other Christians. The Mangalorean Catholic community flourished during the rest of Hyder Ali's reign.

During Hyder Ali's absence from the Carnatic, the British recovered many places that Hyder Ali had taken and only weakly garrisoned, and advanced as far south as Dindigul. They also convinced the Marathas to enter the conflict, and a large force of theirs, under the command of Morari Rao, joined with Colonel Smith at Ooscota in early August 1768. This army then began preparations to besiege Bangalore, but Hyder Ali returned to Bangalore from Malabar on 9 August, in time to harass the allies before the siege could begin. On 22 August, Hyder Ali and his Mysore forces attacked the Maratha camp during the Battle of Ooscota, but was repulsed when faced with the large Maratha reinforcements. Hyder Ali was then foiled in an attempt to prevent the arrival of a second British column at the allied camp; the strength of these combined forces convinced him to retreat from Bangalore toward Gurramkonda, where he was reinforced by his brother in law. He also attempted diplomatic measures to prevent a siege of Bangalore, offering to pay ten lakhs rupees and grant other land concessions in exchange for peace. The Company administration countered with a list of demands that included payments of tribute to the Nizam and several land concessions to the East India Company. Hyder Ali specifically refused to deal with Muhammed Ali Khan Wallajah, his nemesis in the Carnatic. The negotiations failed to reach common ground.

On 3 October, Hyder Ali, while moving his army from Guuramkonda back toward Bangalore, surprised a small garrison of Muhammed Ali Khan Wallajah's men at a rock fort call Mulwagal, near Ooscota. British reinforcements were sent, and Colonel Wood was able to recover the lower fort but not the upper. The next day he went out with a few companies of men to investigate movements that might have been cover for enemy reinforcements. This small force, numbering four companies, was surrounded by Hyder Ali's entire army in the Battle of Mulwagal. A stratagem by another officer, Colonel Brooks, prevented the loss of this detachment; Colonel Brooks and another two companies dragged two cannons to the top of a nearby rise, and Brooks called out "Smith! Smith!" while firing the cannons. Both sides interpreted this to mean that Colonel Smith was arriving in force, and Hyder's troops began to retreat. This enabled Colonel Wood to join with Brooks and other reinforcements from Mulwagal before Hyder Ali realised his tactical error. Hyder Ali renewed his attack, but was eventually repulsed with heavy losses: he was estimated to lose 1,000 men while the British lost about 200. The severity of the conflict convinced Colonel Smith that he would be unable to effectively besiege Bangalore without first inflicting a major defeat on Hyder Ali in open battle. Company officials blamed Smith for the failure to decisively defeat Hyder Ali, and recalled him to Madras. Hyder Ali took the opportunity to besiege Hosur, and Colonel Wood marched in relief of the town. As Wood approached, Hyder Ali raised the siege, sneaked around Wood's column, and attacked his baggage train in a battle near Bagalur. Hyder Ali successfully captured supplies and arms, and drove Wood in disgrace toward Venkatagiri. Wood was consequently recalled and replaced by Colonel Lang.

Hyder Ali then raised additional forces in Mysore and went on the offensive. In November 1768 he split his army into two, and crossed the ghats into the Carnatic, regaining control of many minor posts held by the British. En route to Erode Hyder Ali overwhelmed one contingent of British, who were sent as prisoners to Seringapatam when it was established that one of its officers was serving in violation of a parole agreement. After rapidly establishing control over much of the southern Carnatic, his march approached Madras. This prompted the British to send an envoy to discuss peace; because of Hyder Ali's insistence that the Nawab of the Carnatic be excluded from the negotiations, they went nowhere. Hyder Ali then surprised Company authorities by taking a picked force of 6,000 cavalry and a small number of infantry, and made in three days a forced march of 130 miles (210 km) to the gates of Madras.

This show of force compelled the company to negotiate further. Hyder Ali, who was seeking diplomatic leverage against the Marathas, wanted an alliance of mutual defence and offence. The Company refused to accede to an offensive military treaty; the treaty signed at Madras on 29 March 1769, restored the status quo ante bellum, except for Mysore's acquisition of Karur, and also included language that each side would help the other defend its territory. In summarising Hyder Ali's conduct of the war, biographer Lewin Bowring notes that he "evinced high qualities as a tactician and the sagacity of a born diplomatist."

== Arab, Persian and Turkish relations ==
When Hyder took over the Malabar territories, he took advantage of the coastal access to develop relations with trading partners overseas. To this end he established port tariffs that were biased against European traders and preferential for Mysorean and Arab traders. Beginning in 1770 he sent ambassadors to Abu Hilal Ahmad bin Said in Muscat and Karim Khan in Shiraz, then the capital of Persia, seeking military and economic alliances.

In a 1774 embassy to Karim Khan, the ruler of Persia, he sought to establish a trading post on the Persian Gulf. Karim responded by offering Bandar Abbas, but nothing further seems to have passed between them on the subject. Karim Khan later did send 1,000 troops to Mysore in 1776 in response to another embassy in 1775.

Nursullah Khan, Hyder's ambassador, had more success in Muscat, where a trading house was established in 1776.

During the final years of his reign Hyder Ali also planned to send an embassy to the Ottoman Sultan Mustafa III, but it was his son Tipu Sultan who succeeded in making direct contact with Istanbul.

== Second war with the Maratha Confederacy ==
Hyder, believing he would be supported by the British in conflict with the Marathas, began demanding tribute payments from smaller states on the frontiers between Maratha and Mysore territories, and refused to pay tributes demanded by the Marathas. The Marathas responded in November 1770 with an invasion by an army of 35,000 men. Pursuant to their treaty, Hyder requested British assistance. The Company refused, and Hyder retreated, slashing and burning as he went to deny the bounty of the land to the Marathas. The Marathas captured much of north-eastern Mysore, and consolidated their gains during the monsoon season. Hyder offered to pay some of the tribute demanded, but his offer was rejected as insufficient, and the Marathas renewed the offensive after the monsoons. They advanced to the vicinity of Seringapatam, and then feinted a withdrawal to the north. When Hyder followed, they turned in force, and claimed to inflict serious casualties on Hyder's army, and captured most of its baggage. They then fruitlessly besieged Seringapatam for five weeks, before abandoning the effort and instead took Bangalore. Hyder again appealed to the British for help, but their pre-conditions and proposed terms were unacceptable to him, and an attempt by Hyder to get them to go on the offensive scuttled the negotiations. In 1772 Hyder finally sued for peace. He agreed to pay 3.6 million rupees in tribute arrears, and 1.4 million rupees in annual tribute, and ceded territory all the way to Bangalore. Upon his return to Seringapatam after the peace was concluded, Hyder learned that Nanjaraja, the titular ruler of Mysore, had been engaged in secret communications with the Marathas. Hyder ordered Nanjaraja strangled, and placed his brother Chamaraja on the throne.

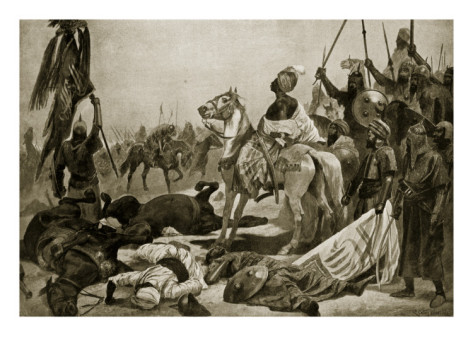
Hyder Ali's melee forces in battle.

The peace with the Marathas was short-lived. The Peshwa Madhavrao I died late in 1772, beginning a struggle for his succession. In 1773, Hyder used this opportunity to send Tipu with an army to recover territories lost to the Marathas to the north, while he descended into Coorg, which provided a more secure route to the Malabar territories he wanted to recover from the Marathas. A claimant to the Coorg throne had asked for Hyder's assistance in 1770 when he was pre-occupied with the Marathas. He quickly captured Coorg's capital, Merkara, imprisoning Raja Vira Rajendra. He installed a Brahmin as Governor to collect revenues before continuing to Malabar, where by the end of 1774 he had recovered all his lost territory. The Coorgs rose in rebellion against his Governor, upon which Hyder returned to Coorg, crushed the rebellion, and hanged most of the ring-leaders. This did not stop the restive Coorgs from becoming a continuing problem for Hyder, and for, Tipu after his death.

In 1776 the young Raja Chamaraja Wodeyar VIII died. To choose a successor, Hyder had all of the children of the royal family brought together, and watched them play. A child, also named Chamaraja Wodeyar IX, chose to play with a jewelled dagger, and was supposedly selected on that basis as the new Raja of Mysore.

By March 1775, the leadership situation at Poona, the Maratha capital, had stabilised, and the Marathas joined an alliance with the Nizam of Hyderabad to oppose Hyder. The Maratha army was routed by one of Hyder's Generals in 1776, and Hyder either bribed or sufficiently threatened the Nizam's military leaders so that they withdrew from the campaign. This only temporarily halted the conflict, which was fought with renewed vigor until 1779. Hyder successfully extended his domain to the Krishna River after a lengthy siege of Dharwad. In a controversial action, Hyder in 1779, dealt harshly with Madakari Nayaka, the ruler of Chitradurga. Madakari had supported Hyder in earlier conflicts, but in 1777 had changed allegiance to the Marathas. After seizing Chitradurga, Hyder sent Madakari Nayaka to Seringapatam as a prisoner, where he died. Hyder further sent 20,000 of Madakari's followers to Seringapatam, where the boys among them were allegedly forcibly converted to Islam and formed into so-called chela battalions in the Mysorean army.

== Second Anglo-Mysore War ==
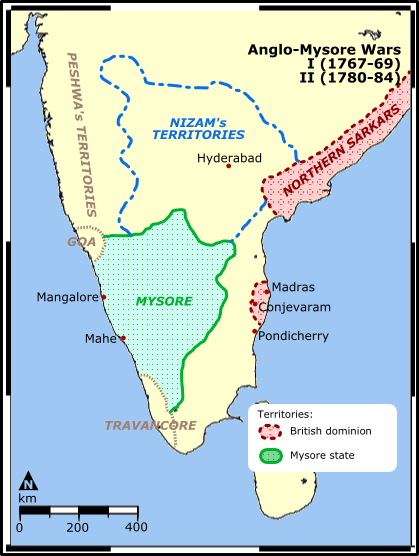
Theater map for the First and the Second Anglo-Mysore Wars

During the lengthy conflict with the Marathas, Hyder had several times requested the assistance of the East India Company, and it had each time been refused, in part due to the influence at Madras, of Hyder's enemy, the Nawab of Arcot. The British had also angered the Marathas by repudiating treaties, with whom they were at war for much of the 1770s, and they had also upset the Nizam of Hyderabad Asaf Jah II over their occupation of Guntur.

In 1771, Maratha envoys had approached Hyder with a proposal to ally against the company, with the goal of wresting control of eastern India from their rule. Since Hyder was at the time still attempting alliance with the British, he informed them of this offer, noting that he thought the Marathas would gain too much power and even threaten his own position under those circumstances. The Marathas, still at war with the British, renewed an offer of alliance in 1779. In this case, the alliance was to include the Nizam. His decision to join this alliance was prompted by two British actions. The first was the British capture by capitulation of the west-coast port of Mahé, part of a concerted effort by the British to capture all French outposts after the 1778 French entry into the American Revolutionary War. Hyder received much of his French-supplied equipment through this French-controlled port, and had provided troops for its defence. Furthermore, the action had provoked the Nairs on the Malabar coast to rise in rebellion again, although Hyder had quickly put this down. The second offence was the movement of British troops through territory under his control (and also other territory controlled by the Nizam) from Madras to Guntur. There was a skirmish in the hills, and the British detachment ended up retreating to Madras.

Hyder Ali began rebuilding his navy in 1778. Employing Joze Azelars, a Dutchman, he had built eight ketches with masts and 40 cannons and eight smaller dhows. When the war broke out in 1779, Azelars noted that the Brahmans and their allies made every possible effort to halt progress of the newly rebuilt navy based at Bhatkal.

The alliance planned to make virtually simultaneous attacks on British holdings all throughout India, while the Marathas agreed to honour Hyder's claims to territories he currently held north of the Tungabhadra River and reduced the amount of tribute he was required to pay under earlier agreements. Hyder expected to receive assistance from the French, especially in the Carnatic, the territory he sought to conquer. However, diplomatic actions by Governor Warren Hastings and the Company successfully convinced both the Nizam and the Marathas not to take up arms, and Hyder ended up fighting the war on his own.

He successfully gained alliances with Ali Raja Bibi Junumabe II of Cannanore Arakkal Kingdom and the Muslim Mappila community and later even met with Muslim Malays from Malacca, who were in Dutch service.

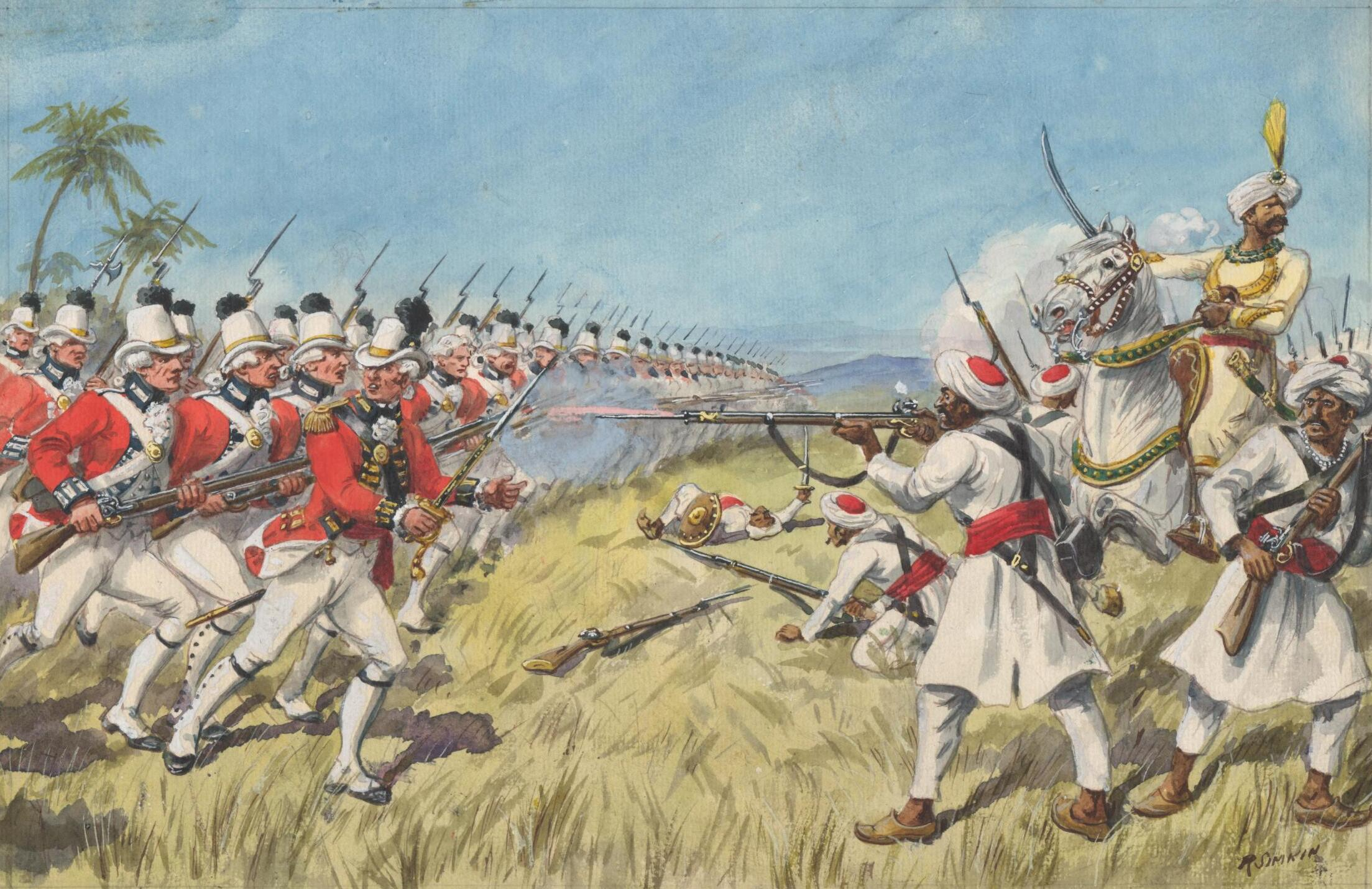
A British illustration of Sayed Sahib leading Hyder Ali's forces during the Siege of Cuddalore.

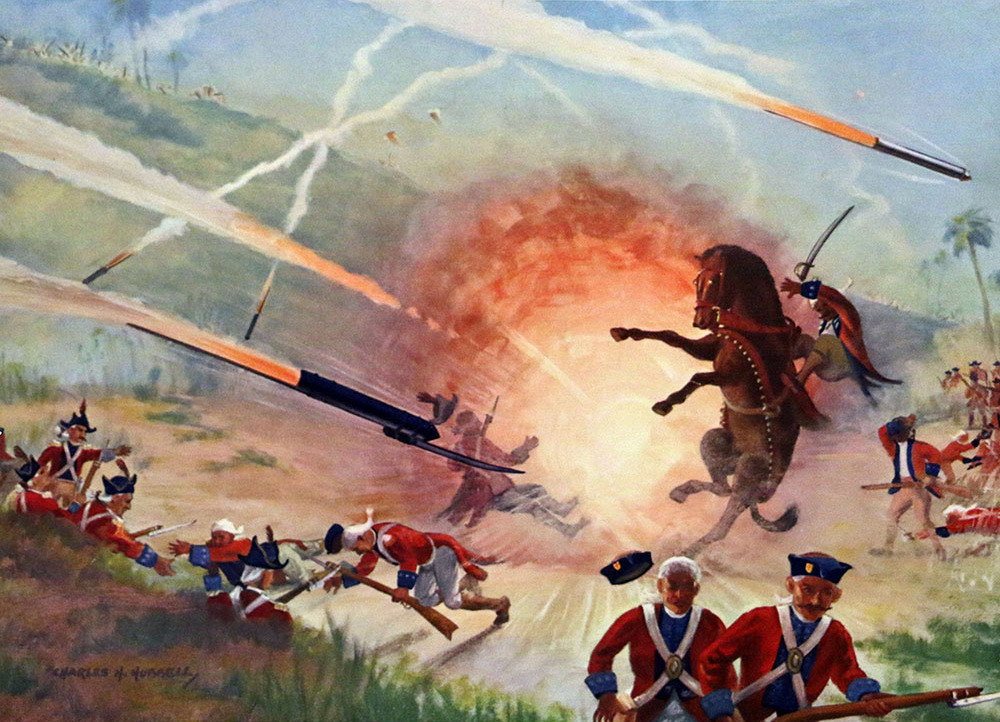
The Battle of Pollilur, where the forces of Hyder Ali effectively used Mysorean rockets and Rocket artillery against closely massed East India Company troops.

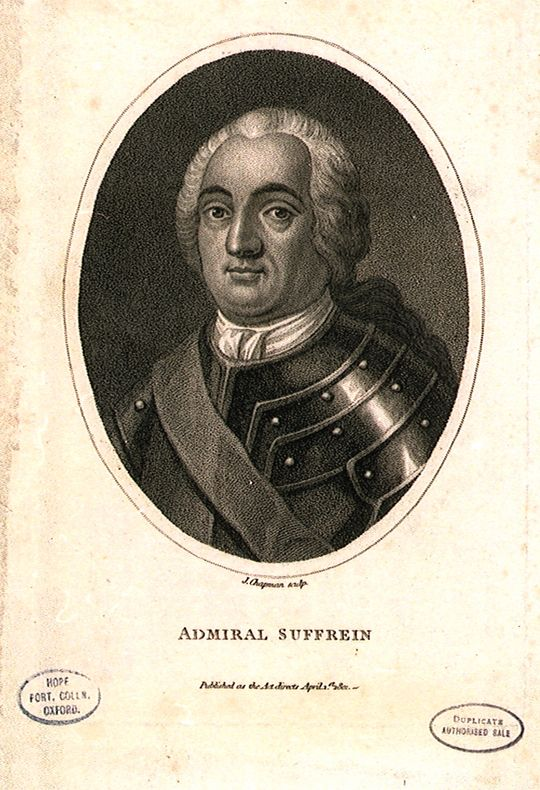
Pierre André de Suffren ally of Hyder Ali.

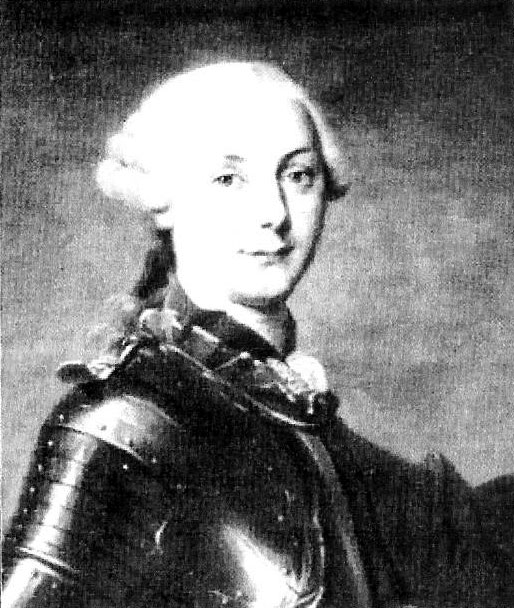
Marquis de Bussy-Castelnau ally of Hyder Ali.

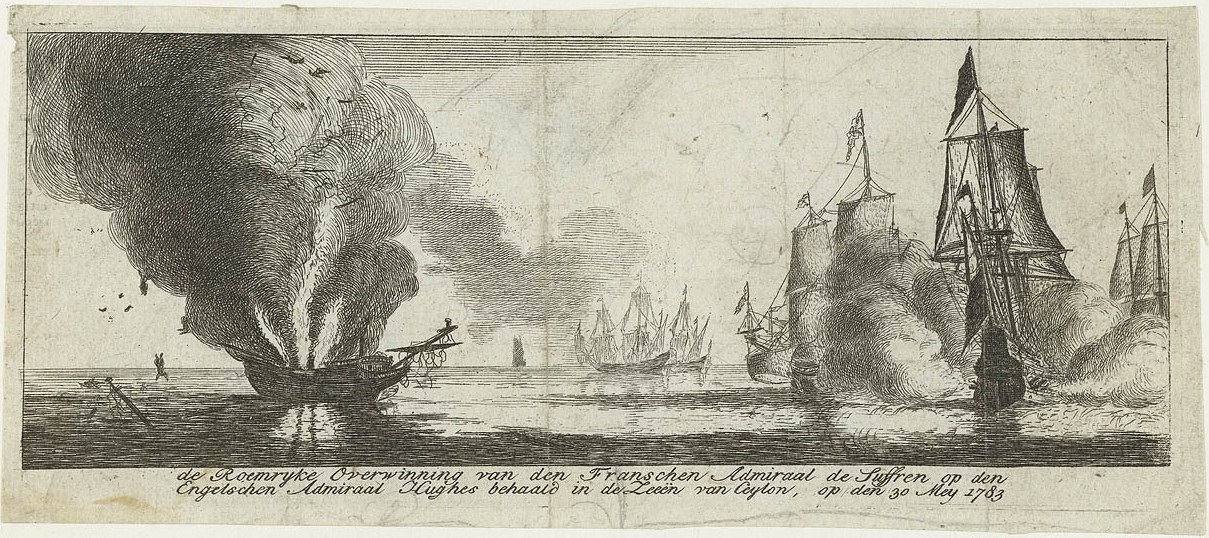
French Admiral Suffren (with the support of Hyder Ali) comes to the aid of Reynier van Vlissingen's Dutch forces against the Admiral Edward Hughes.

=== Descent upon the Carnatic ===
The army Hyder assembled was one of the largest seen in southern India, estimated to number 83,000. Carefully co-ordinating the actions of his subordinate commanders, he swept down the Eastern Ghats onto the coastal plain in July 1780, laying waste the countryside. Due to Hyder's secrecy and poor British intelligence, officials in Madras were unaware of his movements until the fires of burning villages just 9 miles (14 km) away were seen in Madras. Hyder himself organised the Siege of Arcot, while detaching his son Karim Khan Sahib to take Porto Novo. The movement in August of Sir Hector Munro with a force of over 5,000 from Madras to Kanchipuram (Conjeevaram) prompted Hyder to lift the siege of Arcot and move to confront him. Word then arrived that Munro was awaiting the arrival of reinforcements from Guntur under Colonel William Baillie, so he sent a detachment under Tipu to intercept them, and eventually followed in strength himself, when Munro sent a force from his army to meet Baillie. Tipu and Hyder surrounded Baillie's force, and compelled the surrender of about 3,000 men in the Battle of Pollilur on 10 September; it was the first effective use of rocket artillery and made a strong impression upon the British. Hyder then renewed the siege of Arcot, which fell in November.

Shortly after the outbreak of hostilities, Governor Hastings had sent General Sir Eyre Coote south from Bengal to take charge of British forces opposing Hyder. He arrived at Madras in November to take command from Munro. Coote marched into the Carnatic, and eventually occupied Cuddalore. After being re-supplied there, he besieged Chidambram, where an assault on the fort was repulsed.

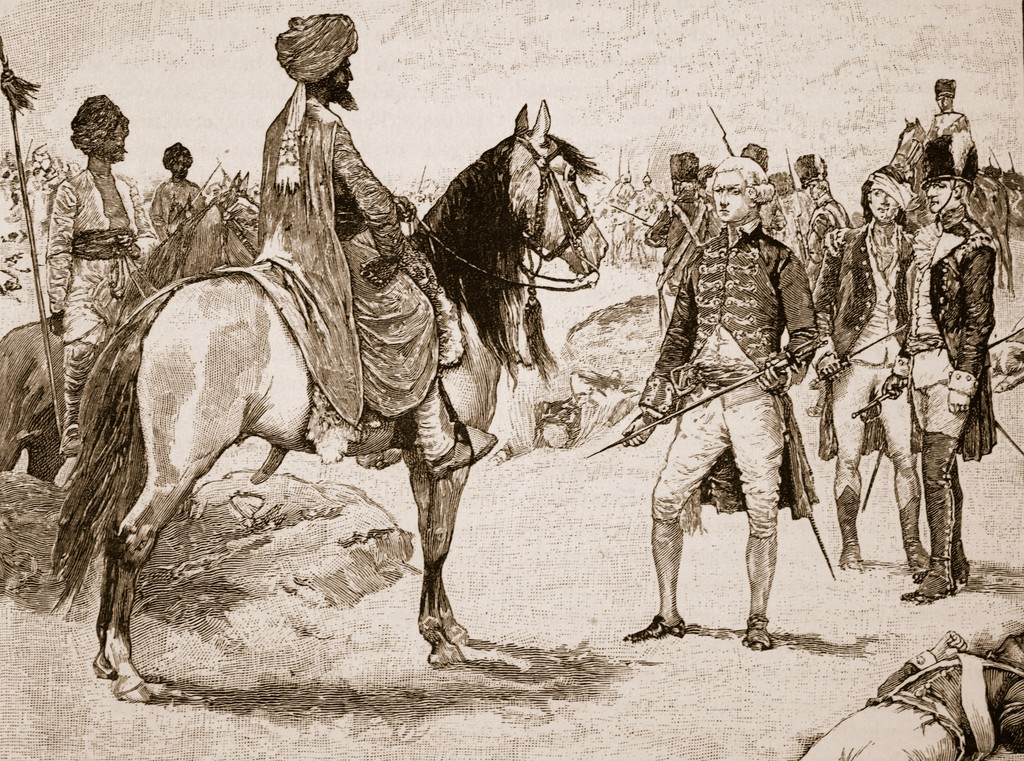
Baillie surrenders to Hyder Ali.

Hyder had in the mean-time descended into Tanjore, with severe consequences. After extracting the allegiance of the Maratha king Thuljaji, Hyder plundered the country, destroying cattle and crops. The economic output of Tanjore is estimated to have fallen by 90% between 1780 and 1782. The economic devastation wrought by these attacks was so severe that Tanjore's economy did not recover until the start of the 19th century; the era is referred to in local folklore as the Hyderakalam.

With General Coote at Cuddalore, Hyder then made a forced march to interpose his army between Chidambram and Cuddalore, cutting Coote's supply line. Coote marched to face him, and won a decisive victory in the Battle of Porto Novo on 1 July 1781; Coote estimated that Hyder lost 10,000 men in the battle. Hyder then dispatched Tipu in an attempt to prevent the junction of Coote's army with reinforcements from Bengal. This failed, and in late August the two armies met again at Pollilur, chosen by Hyder as a place to make a stand, because it was the site of his victory over Baillie the previous year. Hyder was defeated this time, although the battle was not decisive. While Coote re-grouped and searched for provisions, Hyder took the opportunity to besiege Vellore. Madras authorities convinced the ageing Coote to put off his retirement and relieve the fortress there. Hyder and Coote met in battle at Sholinghur, near Vellore. Hyder's artillery was ineffective, and the re-provisioned Vellore, which had been on the brink of surrender.

Lord Macartney, who had recently arrived to take the Governorship of Madras, also brought news that Britain was at war with the Dutch. Consequent to this, the company was instructed to seize Dutch holdings in India, and Macartney had ordered a detachment from Tanjore, under Colonel Braithwaite, to capture the main Dutch post at Negapatam. Hyder made an agreement with the Dutch to provide troops for its defence, but was himself forced away from Negapatam by Braithwaite. The British took Negapatam after a three-week siege in October and November 1781. This setback forced Hyder to withdraw from most of Tanjore.

In January 1782, General Coote, his health failing, again set out to re-provision Vellore. Hyder did not prevent the re-supply, but shadowed the British back toward Tripassore, offering battle near Sholinghur. Coote successfully manoeuvred away from Hyder without battle. In February, Hyder detached Tipu with a sizeable force to recover Tanjore. Intelligence failures led the main British garrison to become surrounded by this superior force; Colonel Brathwaite and 2,000 men surrendered. Hyder was also pre-occupied by bad news from the west. A Mysorean force that had been besieging Tellicherry was broken, with its commander and his siege guns captured, and Coorg and Malabar were also descending into open rebellion. Hyder consequently sent forces west to deal with these matters, and was preparing to follow himself when word arrived on 10 March that a French force had landed at Porto Novo. Hyder immediately sent Tipu from Tanjore to meet with them, and followed himself from Arcot. At this time he had a celebrated meeting with the French Admiral Suffren, and the allies agreed on a plan to establish Cuddalore as a French base. Cuddalore was occupied without resistance on 8 April, and Hyder's army, joined by the French, marched toward Permacoil, which fell in May. Coote responded by marching toward Arni, where Hyder had a major supply depot. Hyder and the French had been considering an assault on Wandiwash, but abandoned that idea and marched to face Coote. They skirmished there on 2 June. In August the British landed a force on the Malabar coast, to which Hyder responded by sending additional troops under Tipu to the west. The onset of the monsoon season then suspended most military activity on the eastern plain, and Hyder established his camp near Chittoor.

== Death ==
He was a bold, an original, and an enterprising commander, skilful in tactics and fertile in resources, full of energy and never desponding in defeat. He was singularly faithful to his engagements and straightforward in his policy towards the British...his name is always mentioned in Mysore with respect, if not with admiration.

— Bowring,

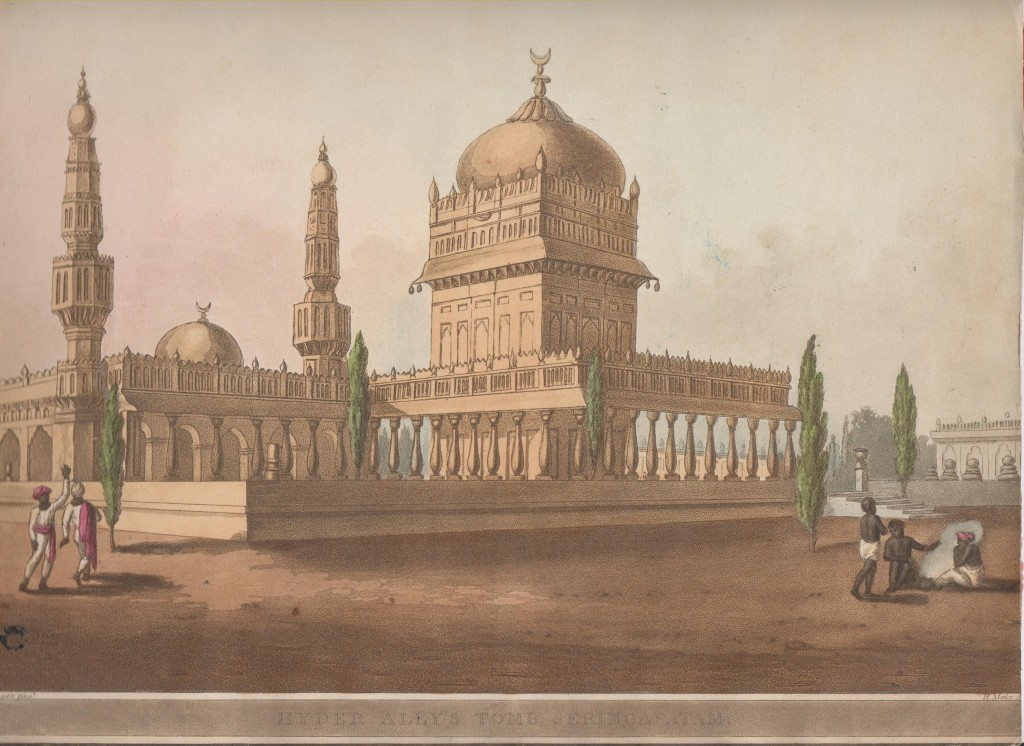
Tomb of Hyder Ali.

Hyder Ali, who had suffered from a cancerous growth on his back, died in his camp on 6 December 1782. Some other accounts record it as 7 December 1782 and some historical accounts in the Persian language record the death in dates ranging from Hijri 1 Moharram 1197 to Hijri 4 Moharram 1197 in the Islamic calendar. The differences in recorded dates may be due to the lunar calendar and the differences in moon sightings in the surrounding kingdoms.

Hyder's advisers tried to keep his death a secret until Tipu could be recalled from the Malabar coast. Upon learning of his father's death Tipu immediately returned to Chittoor to assume the reins of power. His accession was not without problems: he had to put down an attempt by an uncle to place Tipu's brother Abdul Karim on the throne. The British learned of his death within 48 hours of its occurrence, but the dilatory attitude of Coote's replacement, James Stuart, meant that they were unable to capitalise on it militarily.

Hyder Ali was buried at the Gumbaz in Seringapatam, the mausoleum raised by his son Tipu Sultan in 1782–84.

== Mysore Navy ==
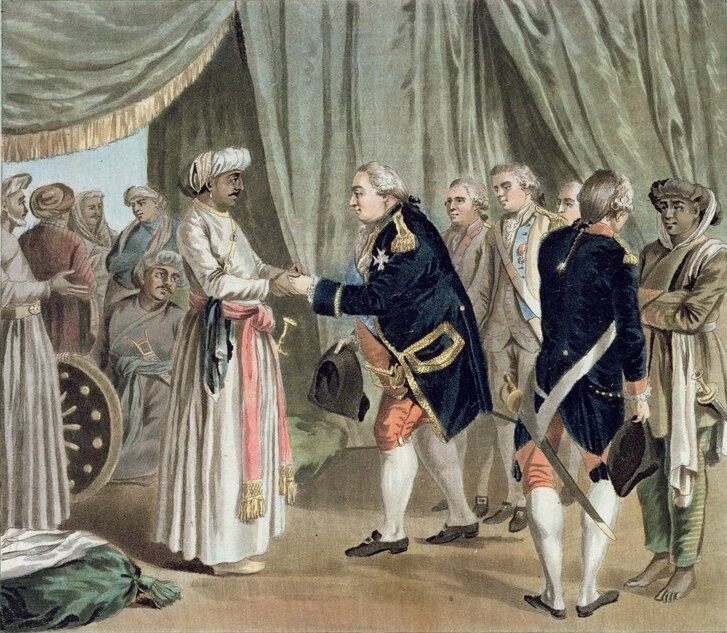
French Admiral Suffren meeting with Hyder Ali in 1782, J.B. Morret engraving, 1789.

In 1763, Hyder Ali and Tipu Sultan established their first naval fleet on the Malabar Coast, under the command of Ali Raja Kunhi Amsa II a large and well armed fleet consisting of 10 dhows and 30 larger ketches in the Indian Ocean, in his attempts to conquer islands that had withstood the Mughal Emperor Aurangzeb. In 1763 his allies, the Ali Rajas, sailed from Lakshadweep and Cannanore carrying on board sepoys and on its pennons the colours and emblems of Hyder Ali, and captured the Maldives.

Ali Raja returned to Mysore to pay homage to Hyder Ali, presenting him the captured and blinded Sultan of the Maldives Hasan 'Izz ud-din. Outraged at this excess, Hyder Ali stripped Ali Raja of the command of his fleet.

Hyder Ali, like his son Tipu Sultan protected foreign merchant ships, and the Mysore navy is even known to have protected and convoyed Chinese merchant ships in the region.

In 1768, Hyder Ali lost two grabs and 10 gavilats in a naval skirmish with forces of the East India Company. He was left with eight garbs and ten galivats, most of them damaged beyond repair.

On 19 February 1775, two of Hyder Ali's ketches attacked HMS Seahorse, which drove them off after a brief exchange of fire.

On 8 December 1780 Edward Hughes attacked Hyder Ali's fleet causing considerable damage once again. Mysore is known to have lost some of the best ships it ever constructed in that naval-battle at Mangalore. But the British were unable to stop Suffren's fleet in 1781.

== Military rocket innovations ==
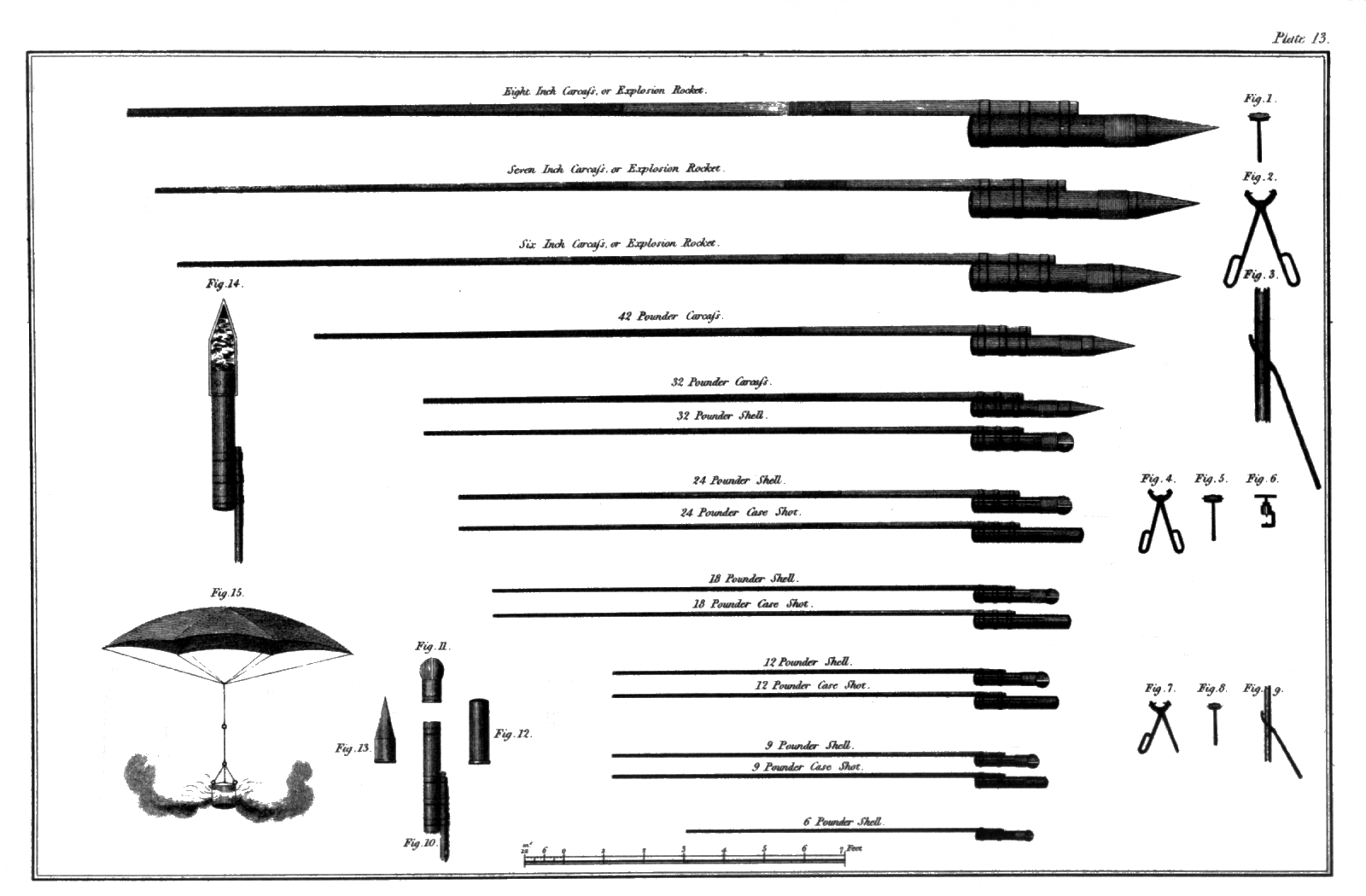
The Mysore rockets utilised effectively during the Anglo-Mysore Wars, and were later updated by the British into the Congreve rockets, which were successively employed during the Napoleonic Wars and the War of 1812.

Hyder Ali was an innovator in the military use of rockets, which were used against positions and territories held by the East India Company during the Anglo-Mysore Wars. Although rocket technology originated in China and had made its way to India and Europe by the 13th century, development of accurate cannons had sidelined rockets as a military technology in Europe. Rocket technology was already in use when Hyder's father served (he commanded a company of 50 rocketmen), but it was Hyder who improved them and significantly expanded their use in the military. Technological innovations included the use of high-quality iron casing (better than was then available in Europe) for the combustion chamber, enabling the use of higher-powered explosive charges. He also organised companies of rocketmen who were experienced in aiming rockets based on the size of the rocket and the distance to the target. Rockets could also be mounted on carts that improved their mobility and made possible the firing of large numbers of them all at once. Rockets developed by Hyder and Tipu led to a renaissance of interest in the technology in Britain, where William Congreve, supplied with rocket cases from Mysore, developed what became known as Congreve rockets in the early 19th century.

In Hyder's time the Mysorean army had a rocket corps of as many as 1,200 men, which Tipu increased to 5,000. At the 1780 Battle of Pollilur, during the second war, Colonel William Baillie's ammunition stores are thought to have been detonated by a hit from one of Hyder's rockets, contributing to the British defeat.

== Economic policy ==
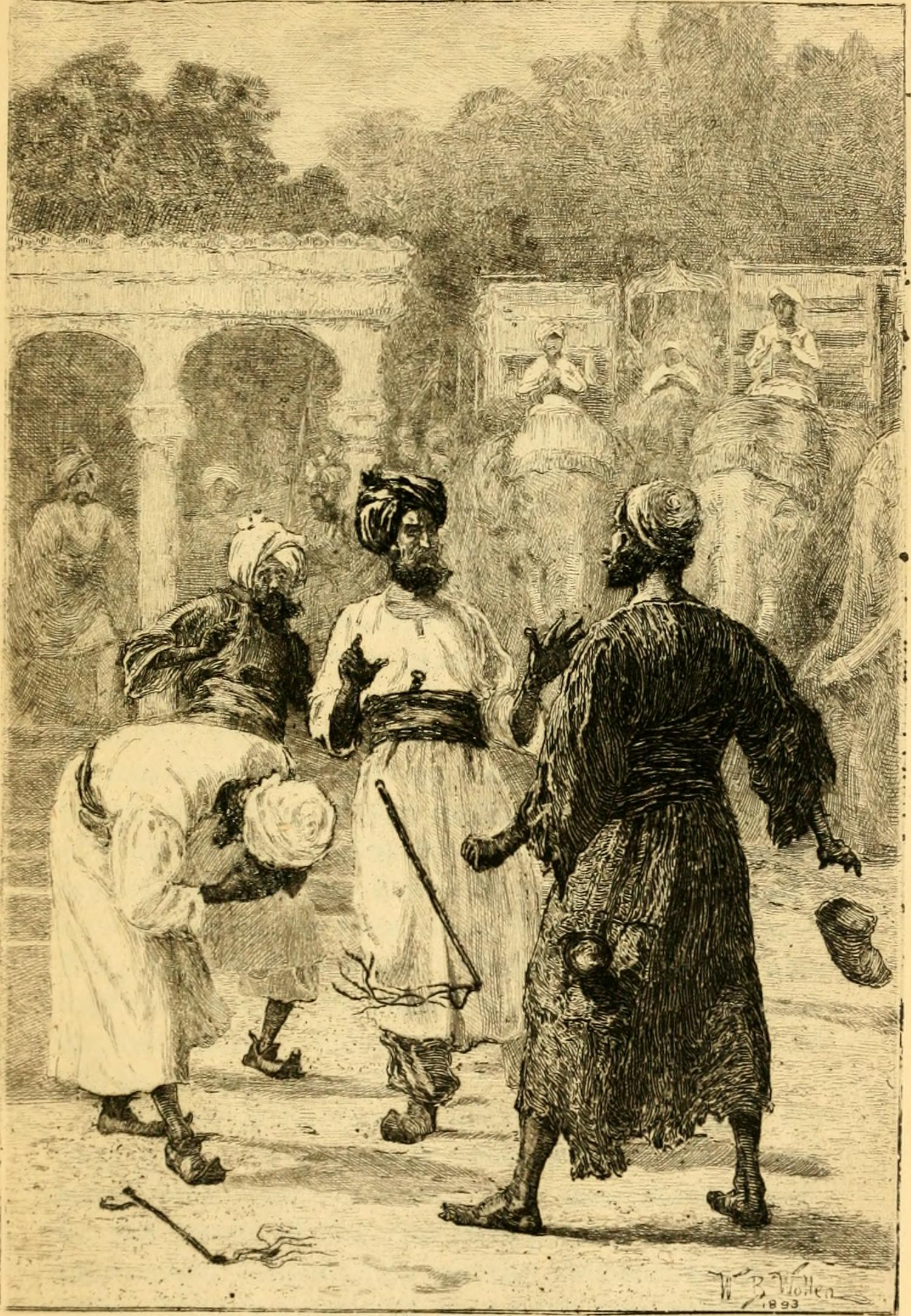
Hyder Ali as 'The Pretended Fakir' (1894), from The Surgeon's Daughter by Sir Walter Scott (1827).

The peak of Mysore's economic power was under Hyder Ali and his son Tipu Sultan in the post-Mughal era of the mid-late 18th century. They embarked on an ambitious program of economic development, aiming increase the wealth and revenue of Mysore.

== Family ==
Details are sketchy on Hyder's personal life. He had at least two wives. His second wife was Fatima, the mother of Tipu, his brother Karim, and a daughter. He may have also married the sister of Abdul Hakim Khan, the Nawab of Savanur; Bowring describes it as a marriage, but Punganuri Rao's translator, citing Wilks, claims this was a "concubine marriage". Karim and the daughter were both married to Abdul Hakim's children to cement an alliance in 1779.

== Legacy ==
During the American Revolution, Hyder Ali was the subject of fascination and praise by Patriots. In 1781, the Pennsylvania State Navy commissioned a warship named Hyder-Ally, an eccentrically spelled tribute to the sultan. Philip Freneau, an ally of Thomas Jefferson and one of the country’s leading poets, wrote a poem in honour of the Hyder-Ally and its namesake, the sultan of Mysore:

From an Eastern prince she takes her name,

Who, smit with freedom’s sacred flame

Usurping Britons brought to shame,

His country’s wrongs avenging.

In Williams vs Cabarrus (1793), a lawsuit brought before a circuit court in North Carolina, the two parties disputed a wager made on a horse race. One of the horses was named ‘Hyder Ali’ in tribute to Mysore’s former ruler. On 21 October 1943, Indian freedom fighter Subhas Chandra Bose proclaimed the Provisional Government of Azad Hind (Free India), and the proclamation highlighted the "Warriors" Hyder Ali and his son, Tipu Sultan, for their names are "forever engraved in letters of gold."

== See also ==
- Tipu Sultan
- Husain Ali Khan Bahadur
- Mughal weapons
- Nawab of Savanur
- Arakkal Kingdom
