= Joseph Smith (East India Company officer) =

Brigadier General Joseph Smith (1732/3–1790) was an officer of the British East India Company's army in the mid-18th Century who served in the Carnatic Wars, the Anglo-Mysore Wars and other conflicts in South India. He served with distinction and rose to the position of commander-in-chief of the Madras Army on three occasions (1767-1770, 1770–1772, and 1773–1775).

Smith's father of the same name was an officer of engineers in the EIC forces and Smith followed him into Company service, joining the Madras forces in 1749 and quickly gaining independent commands and rising through the ranks.
