= Anglo-Mysore wars =

1767–1799 armed conflicts in India

The Anglo-Mysore wars were a series of four wars fought during the last three decades of the 18th century between the Sultanate of Mysore on the one hand, and the British East India Company (represented chiefly by the neighbouring Madras Presidency), Maratha Empire, Kingdom of Travancore, and the Kingdom of Hyderabad on the other. Hyder Ali and his succeeding son Tipu Sultan fought the wars on four fronts: with the British attacking from the west, south and east and the Nizam's forces attacking from the north. The fourth war resulted in the overthrow of the house of Hyder Ali and Tipu (the latter was killed in the fourth war, in 1799), and the dismantlement of Mysore to the benefit of the East India Company, which took control of much of the Indian subcontinent.

== The four wars ==
=== First Anglo-Mysore War ===
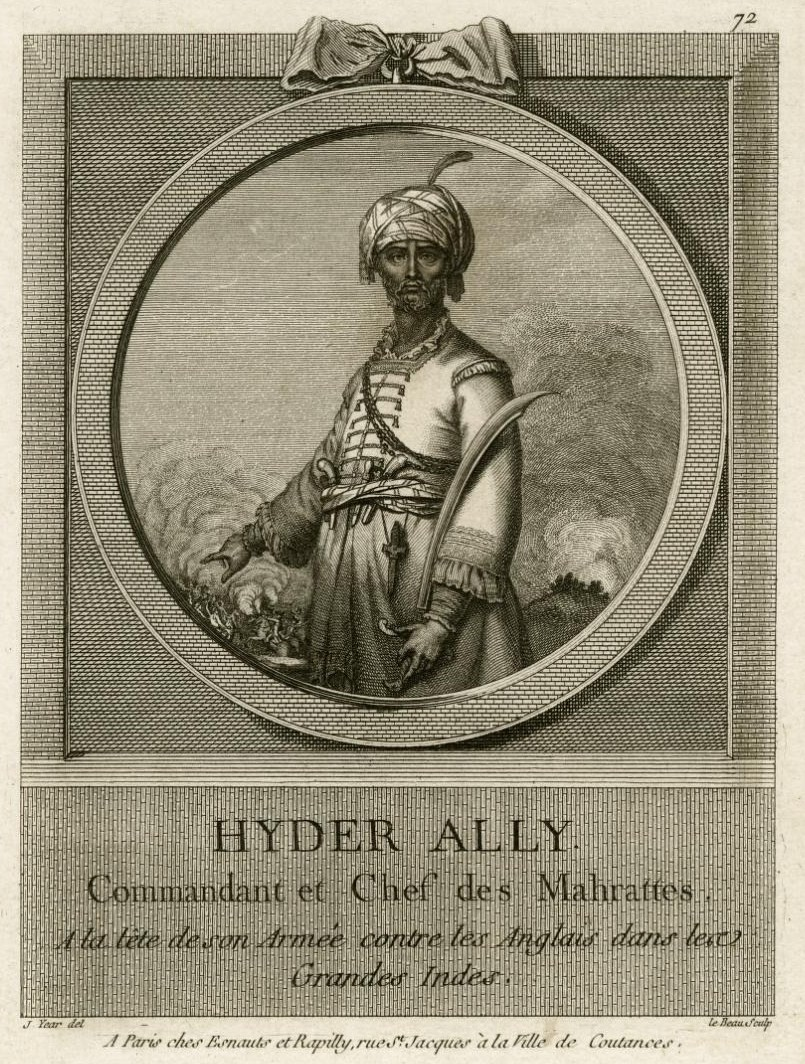
Hyder Ali in 1762, incorrectly described as "Commander in Chief of the Marathas. At the head of his army in the war against the British in India" (French painting).

In the First Anglo-Mysore War (1767–1769), Haider Ali enjoyed some measure of success against the British, almost capturing Madras. The British convinced Nizam Mir Nizam Ali Khan to attack Ali. That was temporary, however, and the Nizam signed a new treaty with the British in February 1768. Ali had to contend with a Bombay Army attacking from the west and a Madras Army attacking from the northeast. However, Ali's attack towards Madras resulted in the Madras government suing for peace, and the resultant Treaty of Madras.

=== Second Anglo-Mysore War ===
The Second Anglo-Mysore War (1780–1784) witnessed bloodier battles with fortunes fluctuating between the contesting powers. Tipu defeated William Baillie at the Battle of Pollilur in September 1780, and John Braithwaite at Kumbakonam in February 1782, both of whom were taken prisoner to Srirangapatana. This war saw the comeback of Sir Eyre Coote, the British commander who defeated Ali at the Battle of Porto Novo and Arni. Tipu continued the war following his father's death. Finally, the war ended with the signing of the Treaty of Mangalore on 11 March 1784, which restored the status quo ante bellum. The Treaty of Gajendraghad in April 1787 ended the conflict with the Marathas. Warren Hastings (1772–1785) was Governor-General of India during the Second Anglo-Mysore War.

=== Third Anglo-Mysore War ===
In the Third Anglo-Mysore War (1790–1792), Tipu Sultan, now an ally of France, invaded the nearby Kingdom of Travancore, a British ally, in 1789. The British forces were commanded by Charles Cornwallis. The resulting war lasted three years and was a nearly defeat for Mysore. The war ended after the 1792 siege of Srirangapatana and the signing of the Treaty of Srirangapatana, according to which Tipu Sultan had to surrender some part of his kingdom to the British East India Company and its allies.

=== Fourth Anglo-Mysore war ===
The Fourth Anglo-Mysore War (1798–1799) saw the death of Tipu Sultan and further reductions in Mysorean territory. Mysore's alliance with the French was seen as a threat to the East India Company, and Mysore was attacked from all four sides. Mysore had 35,000 soldiers, whereas the British commanded 60,000 troops. Nizam Akbar Ali Khan and the Marathas launched an invasion from the north. The British won a decisive victory at the siege of Seringapatam (1799). Tipu Sultan was killed during the defence of the city. Much of the remaining Mysorean territory was annexed by the British, the Nizam, and the Marathas. The remaining core, around Mysore and Seringapatam, was restored to the Indian prince Yuvaraja Krishnaraja Wadiyar III (later Maharaja Krishnaraja Wadiyar III) under his grandmother's regency. Members of the Wodeyar dynasty had been in power before Ali became the de facto ruler. The Wodeyars ruled the remnant Kingdom of Mysore until 1947, when it joined the Dominion of India.

=== Aftermath ===
After the Battles of Plassey (1757), the Bengal War (1763-1765), the passing of The Regulating Act of 1773, which established British dominion over parts of East India, the Anglo-Mysore Wars (1767–1799), the Anglo–Maratha Wars (1775–1819), the Anglo-Nepalese War (1814–1816) and finally the Anglo-Sikh Wars (1845–1849), consolidated the British claim over large part of South Asia, resulting in the British Empire in India, though resistance among various groups such as the Afghans and the Burmese would last well into the early twentieth century.

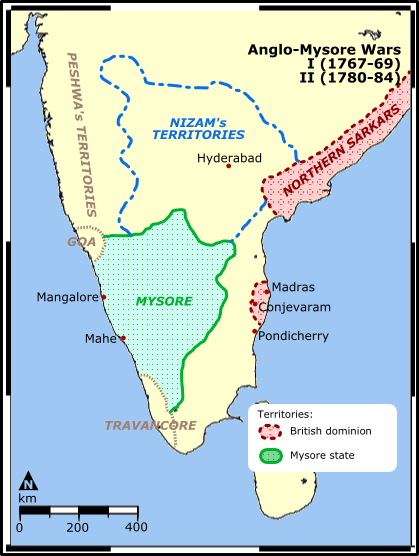
The First and the Second Anglo-Mysore War.

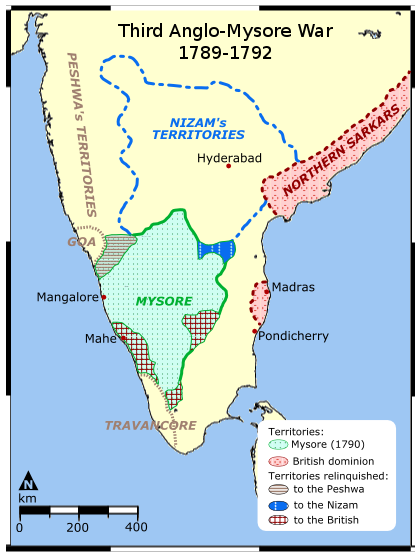
The Third Anglo-Mysore War

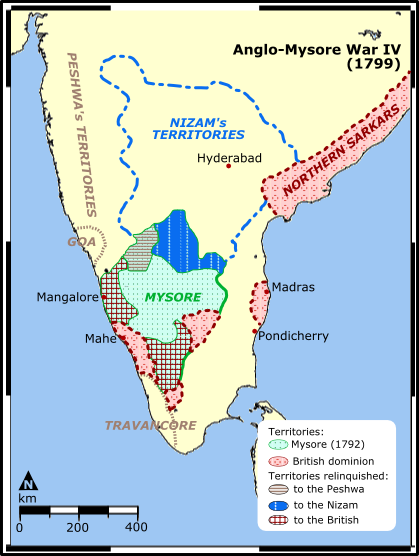
The Fourth Anglo-Mysore War

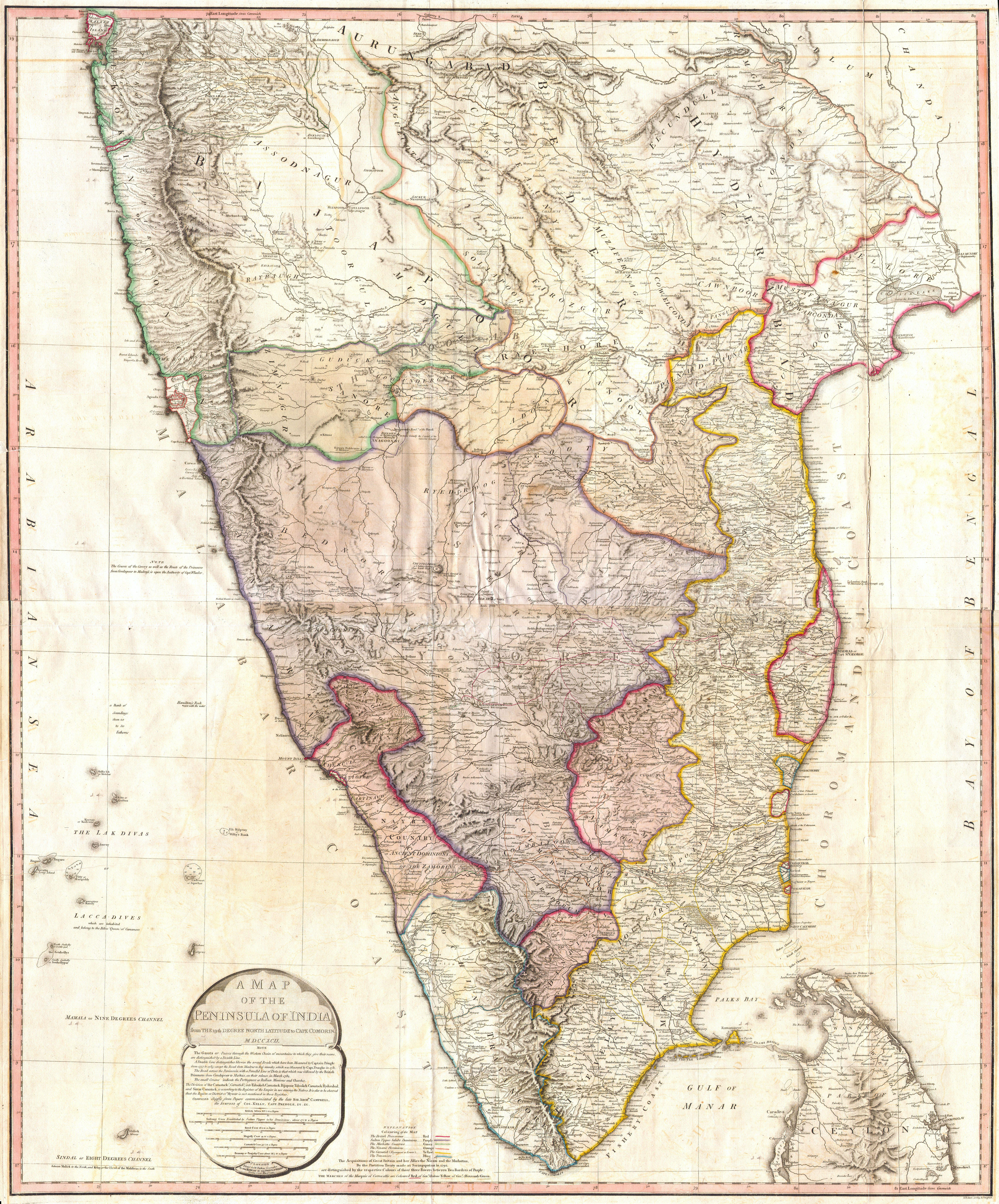
1793 map

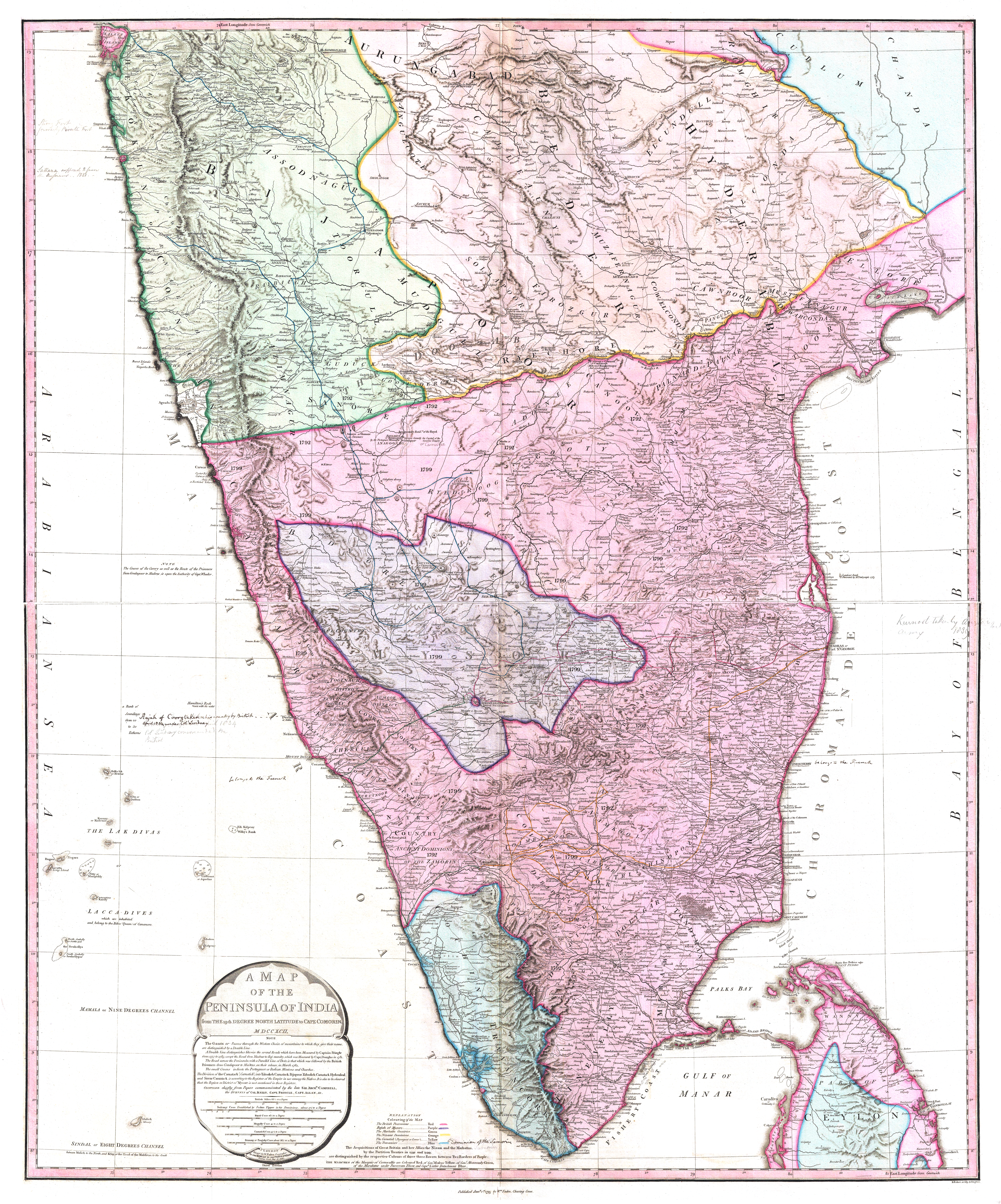
1800 map

== Rockets ==
The Mysorean rockets used by Tipu during the Battle of Pollilur were much more advanced than any that the British East India Company had previously seen, chiefly because of the use of iron tubes for holding the propellant. This enabled higher thrust and a longer range for the missile (up to 2 kilometres (1.2 mi)). After Tipu's eventual defeat in the Fourth Anglo-Mysore War and the capture of a number of Mysorean iron rockets, they were influential in British rocket development, inspiring the Congreve rocket, which was soon put into use in the Napoleonic Wars.

== See also ==
- Mysorean invasion of Malabar
- Battle of Nedumkotta
- Regiment de Meuron
- Garrison Cemetery, Seringapatam
