= Daniel Seddon =

British Army officer (1761–1839)

Lieutenant-General Daniel Seddon
- Born: 1761; Lancashire, Great Britain
- Died: 18 May 1839 (aged 77–78); Paris, France
- Education: Manchester Grammar School
- Military career
- Allegiance: United Kingdom
- Branch: British Army
- Service years: 1778–1839
- Rank: Lieutenant-general
- Units: 100th Regiment of Foot; 75th Regiment of Foot; 22nd Light Dragoons
- Commands: 1st Portuguese Cavalry Brigade
- Conflicts: American Revolutionary War; Battle of Porto Praya; Second Anglo-Mysore War; Siege of Tellicherry; Siege of Bednore (POW); Third Anglo-Mysore War; Siege of Seringapatam; French Revolutionary Wars; Irish Rebellion of 1798; Battle of Antrim (WIA); Egypt campaign; Napoleonic Wars; Peninsular War
- Other work: Mayor of Hartlepool

Lieutenant-General Daniel Seddon (1761 – 18 May 1839) was a British Army officer. He first saw service at the Battle of Porto Praya while travelling with his regiment to India in 1781. Subsequently, he fought in the Second Anglo-Mysore War, serving as a brigade major. He was captured at the Siege of Bednore in 1783 and spent a year imprisoned in the dungeons at Chittledroog. Released at the end of the war, he returned to India to fight in the Third Anglo-Mysore War, participating in the Siege of Seringapatam in 1792.

Seddon was sent to Ireland towards the start of the French Revolutionary Wars. During the Irish Rebellion of 1798 he commanded the garrison at Antrim and fought in the Battle of Antrim, during which he was wounded. He then briefly served in the Egypt campaign in 1801. For the first years of the Napoleonic Wars Seddon served as an inspecting field officer of yeomanry and volunteers. From 1809 to 1810 he was seconded to the Portuguese Army as a brigadier-general to train cavalrymen for the Peninsular War. He was promoted to major-general in 1813 and saw no further service. A resident of Hartlepool, Seddon served terms as mayor of Hartlepool in 1808 and 1827.

== Early life ==
Daniel Seddon was born in Lancashire in 1761. He was the son of John Seddon, a farmer, and Sarah née Taylor. The family lived at Acres Barn in Pendleton, Lancashire. He had an elder brother, Thomas Seddon, who became a clergyman and author, and subsequently published his correspondence with Seddon as Letters Written to an Officer in the Army. Seddon was educated at Manchester Grammar School.

== Military career ==
=== Indian campaigns ===
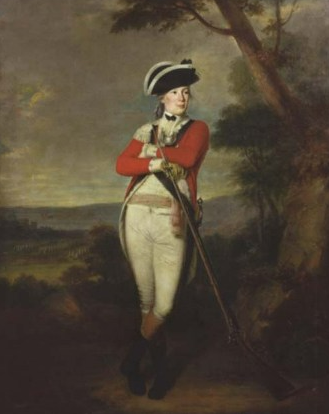
An officer of the 100th Regiment of Foot, 1780

Seddon's first services in the British Army were with the Lancashire Militia, which he joined as an ensign on 13 May 1778. He was then promoted to lieutenant on 25 October 1779. With the American Revolutionary War underway, Seddon transferred to the regular army on 15 April 1780, becoming an ensign in the 96th Regiment of Foot. Later in the same year he moved again, joining the 100th Regiment of Foot as a lieutenant. The regiment was part of a force which sailed from Spithead on 13 March 1781 intending to capture the Dutch Cape Colony. Having reached the Cape Verde Islands, the ships encountered a French fleet on 16 April and fought the indecisive Battle of Porto Praya. This delay allowed the French to reinforce the Cape, and the British fleet sailed on to the East Indies. There the soldiers were taken to fight in the Second Anglo-Mysore War.

Seddon's regiment was sent with several other units to the Malabar Coast, where it landed at Calicut on 18 February 1782. The British force then assisted in raising the Siege of Tellicherry, after which the Tellicherry garrison expanded it with 3,000 sepoys. Seddon was appointed as the brigade major of the advance brigade of this new formation. They advanced south, fighting skirmishes and capturing forts down to Anjanga and then out to Palghat on 18 October. The advance of the force was then met by the Mysorean Tipu Sultan, who commanded a much larger army. Through the campaign and subsequent withdrawal in the face of Tipu, Seddon also worked as an engineer combatting issues brought about by the monsoon rains. The British withdrew to the coast, reaching Pianee on 19 November and defeating Tipu's attack there on 28 November, after which Tipu took his forces away.

Seddon and the British were then transported by ship to Goa, where they joined another force under the command of Brigadier-General Richard Matthews. Seddon relinquished his role as a brigade major and returned to his duties with the 100th, participating in Matthews' campaign as he advanced in land to the Carnatic region, intending to capture Bednore. The Mysoreans defended outside Bednore at a series of ghats, and Seddon was part of the bayonet charges which overran the position over a period of three hours on 28 January 1783; he was slightly injured twice during the engagement.

==== Imprisonment ====
Bednore was occupied by the British, including much of the 100th. Tipu then advanced with an army to relieve the region, and on 9 April Matthews withdrew into Bednore, beginning the Siege of Bednore. They surrendered seventeen days later on 26 April, agreeing terms to give up their weaponry and then retreat. The Mysoreans went back on this and imprisoned the men, chaining them together in pairs. The subalterns, including Seddon, then began a forced march on 10 May, during which men died of starvation and exhaustion, including the officer who Seddon was chained to.

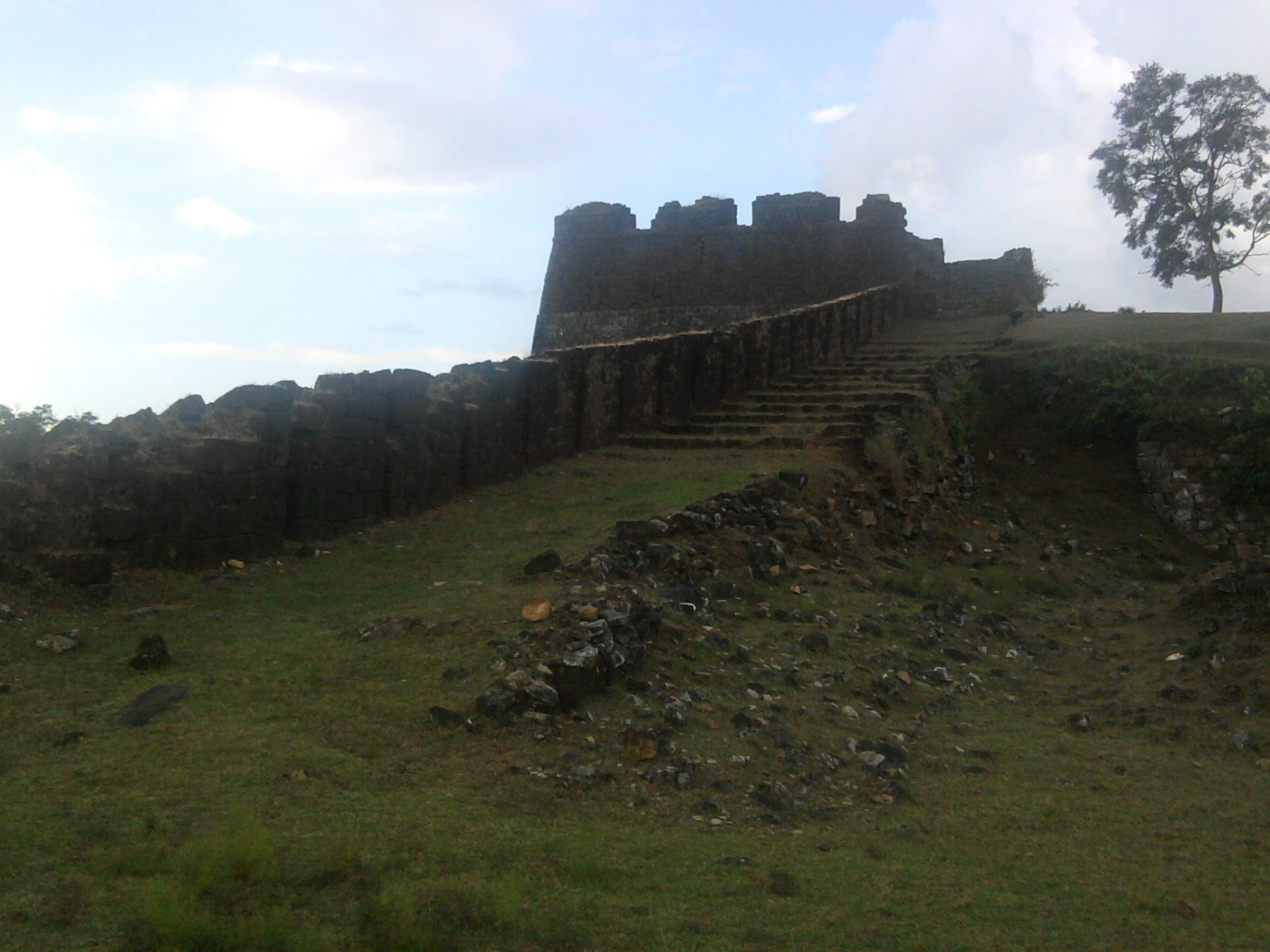
Remains of the fort at Bednore

They arrived at Chittledroog on 21 May and were imprisoned in the fortress dungeon there. Seddon was kept in a small, dark space with thirty-nine other prisoners until the war was ended by the Treaty of Mangalore on 11 March 1784. When they were removed from the dungeon many of them were too weak to stand. After recovering some strength, Seddon and the other released men were marched out of Chittledroog on 28 March, arriving at Vellore on 25 April.

==== Return to service ====
Of the approximately 1,100 men who had formed the 100th upon its arrival in India, Seddon was one of twenty-seven men who survived to be released from captivity two years later. He returned to Britain in 1785 and, just prior to the regiment being disbanded, was promoted to captain-lieutenant on 10 December. Seddon spent his subsequent period of half pay travelling. He visited Germany, Denmark, Sweden, and Russia.

On 26 January 1788 Seddon joined the 75th Regiment of Foot, and travelled with the regiment to India as commander of its grenadier company. Subsequently engaged in the Third Anglo-Mysore War, Seddon was present at the successful Siege of Seringapatam between February and March 1792. The war ended later that year and Seddon resigned his commission so that he could leave the 75th in India and return to Britain.

=== French Revolutionary Wars ===
When Seddon reached Britain in 1793 the French Revolutionary Wars had already broken out; he reversed his decision and continued in the army. Having joined the 22nd Light Dragoons, he was appointed adjutant of the regiment on 11 October 1794. Promotion then came quickly, with Seddon advancing to captain on 3 March 1795 and major on 25 May.

==== Battle of Antrim ====
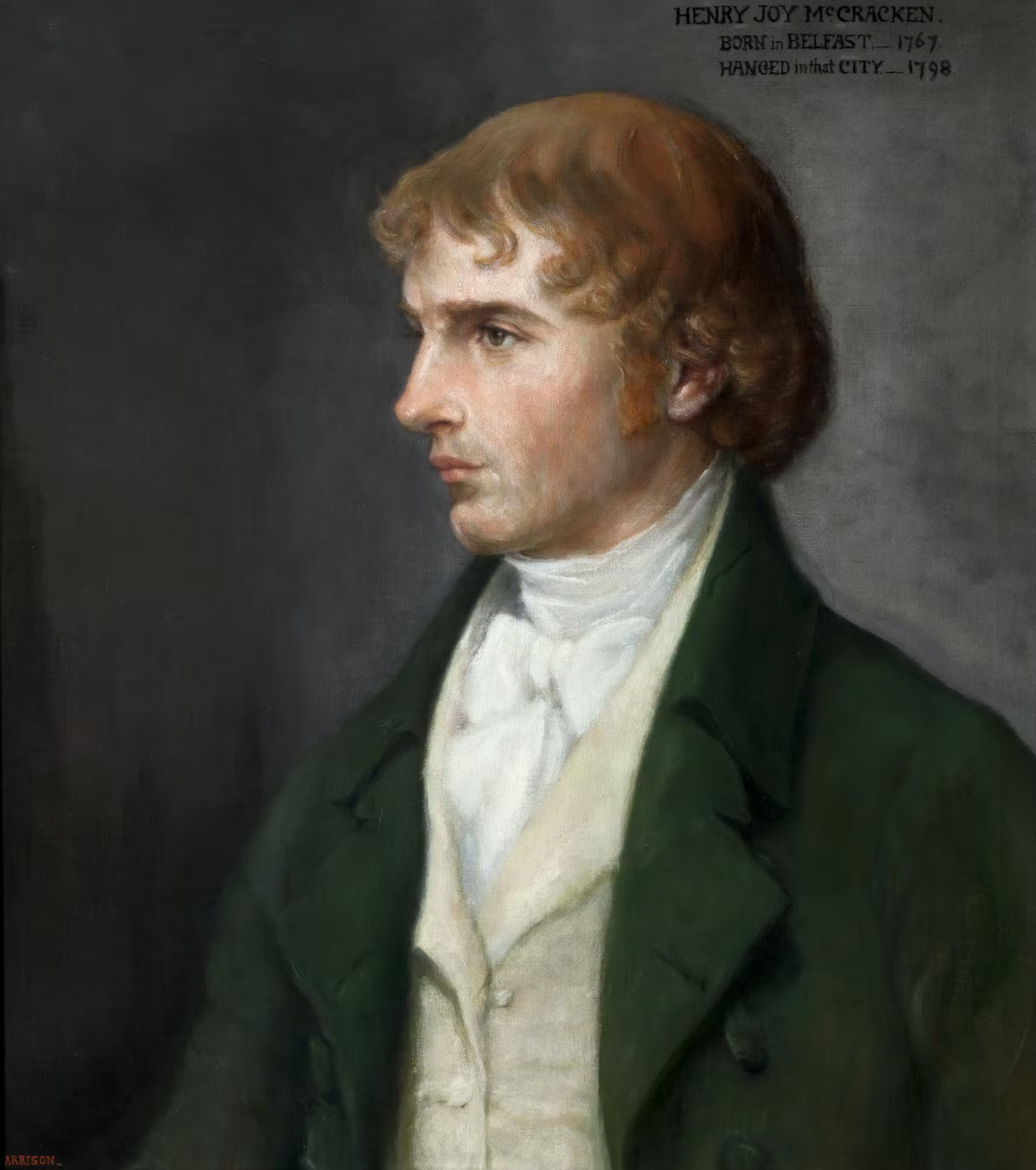
Henry Joy McCracken opposed Seddon at the Battle of Antrim

Seddon was sent with the regiment to serve in Ireland. When the Irish Rebellion of 1798 broke out, he was with a troop at Antrim. The town was strategically important, being 18 miles (29 km) from Belfast and overlooking the major routes into north and west Ireland. Seddon was given command of the Antrim garrison, which also included a company of the Antrim Yeomanry and approximately forty armed civilians. At 9 a.m. on 7 June, Major-General George Nugent sent word to Seddon that the United Irishmen under Henry Joy McCracken were going to attack Antrim that day, knowing that magistrates were collating there for a meeting.

Seddon began patrols of the town's single wide street, garrisoning the Antrim market house and the wall of Antrim Castle as his two strongpoints. McCracken planned to attack Antrim from different directions using four columns of men. Seddon's sentries first sighted the rebels as they organised their columns outside the town at 1:30 p.m., with Seddon holding out for reinforcements promised by Nugent. McCracken marched his main column into Antrim at 2:45 p.m., just as dragoon reinforcements under Colonel William Lumley rode in from the opposite direction and fired two curricle guns at the Irishmen. Lumley then led a cavalry charge down the road, including the 22nd, but the force was hit with canister shot from a rebel cannon and attacked from the sides by infantrymen. Taking heavy casualties and surrounded by pikemen, the cavalry retreated and the British continued to hold Seddon's strongpoints.

A wavering attack from two more of McCracken's columns was then routed by the yeomanry and men posted on the castle wall. The next rebel column arrived in sight of Antrim but assumed the attack had already failed and broke up before attacking. This panicked and confused the rebels that remained in Antrim with McCracken, and these feelings were heightened when more British reinforcements arrived and began to bombard the town with cannon. After half an hour of this the reinforcements entered the town and cleared it of the remainder of McCracken's men. Seddon followed them out with his troop of the 22nd, having been wounded during the battle and had two of his horses shot from underneath him. Of his twenty-six men, Seddon was one of three survivors. The citizens of Antrim presented him with a piece of plate in July in thanks for his actions, which was valued at £315 (equivalent to £34,997 in 2025).

==== Egypt campaign ====
Seddon was advanced to brevet lieutenant-colonel on 1 January 1800. In the following year the 22nd was sent to join the Egypt campaign, sailing from Cork without their horses because there was no transport for them. The regiment arrived in Aboukir Bay on 24 July, and by 9 August had joined the main army outside Alexandria but saw no action in the subsequent campaign. Seddon was still in Egypt in 1802 when the Peace of Amiens was signed; the regiment was disbanded and Seddon went to half pay on 23 June.

=== Napoleonic Wars ===
Seddon returned to active service when the Napoleonic Wars began in 1803, being appointed an inspecting field officer of yeomanry and volunteers in the Northern Command on 20 October. He held that position until 1808, and then on 1 August 1809 was seconded to the Portuguese Army to assist in the Peninsular War. Arriving in Portugal in the same month, Seddon assumed rank as a Portuguese brigadier-general and was given command of the 1st Portuguese Cavalry Brigade. In this role he was tasked with training the Portuguese cavalrymen. While in Portugal he continued to be promoted in British service, becoming a brevet colonel on 25 July 1810. He relinquished his post with the Portuguese Army that December.

Seddon had no further active service with the British Army, but still received advancement through seniority, becoming a major-general on 4 June 1813 and a lieutenant-general on 27 May 1825. He died in Paris on 18 May 1839.

== Personal life ==
Seddon married twice. His first wife was with him at the Battle of Antrim, and spent the battle hiding in a hayloft with her maid. Seddon then married Dorothea Methold née Eden, a daughter of Sir John Eden, 4th Baronet, in 1823. She died on 7 July 1830, aged 61. Seddon lived at Moor House in Hartlepool, which as of 2026 remains extant as a listed building. Outside of his military career Seddon was involved in his local community, serving as mayor of Hartlepool on two occasions, in 1808 and 1827.
