= List of British colours lost in battle =

This is a list of British colours lost in battle. Since reforms in 1747 each infantry regiment carried two colours, or flags, to identify it on the battlefield: a king's colour of the Union Flag and a regimental colour of the same colour as the regiment's facings. The colours were regarded as talismans of the regiment and it was considered a stain on the unit's honour if they were captured. To prevent this, the colours were protected in the field by a colour party of young officers and experienced sergeants, around which the regiment would rally. As the 19th century progressed, regiments found their colour parties became increasingly vulnerable and some chose not to carry them in the field. The loss of two colours at the 1879 Battle of Isandlwana led to parliamentary debates on whether they should still be carried in the field. Heavy casualties among the colour party of the 58th (Rutlandshire) Regiment of Foot at the 1881 Battle of Laing's Nek led to a ban on them being carried in battle and since 1882 none have been taken on active service.

== Background ==
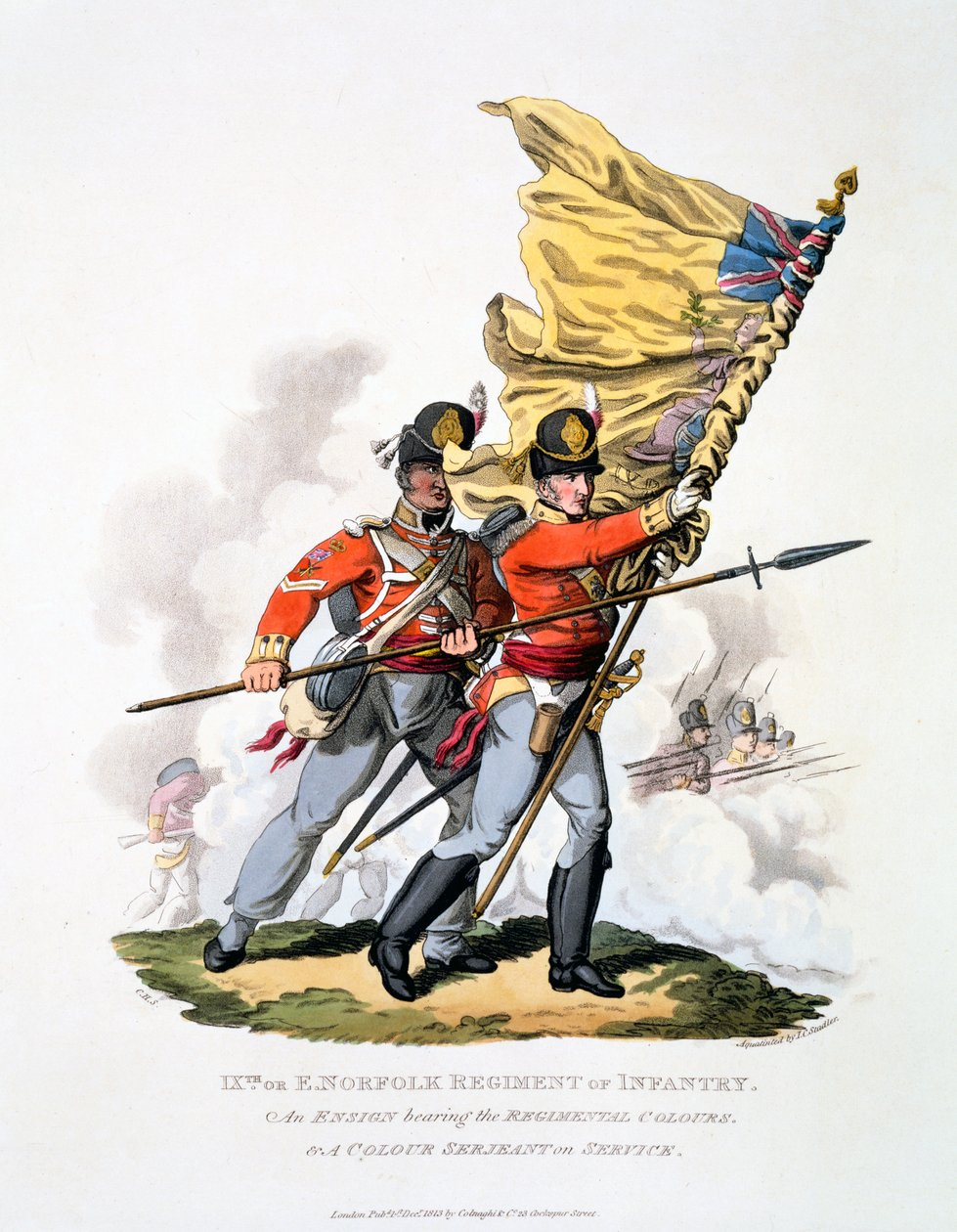
1813 engraving of a 9th Foot ensign with a regimental colour

The colours, flags, of a British Army infantry regiment serve to identify the unit and mark a rallying point for its troops. They were particularly important in early warfare when smoke on the battlefield could make it hard to discern friend from foe. The colours developed into important talismans for the regiments, representing its traditions and honour; to capture an enemy colour was considered a great achievement while allowing one's own colours to be captured, or "lost" to the enemy was considered a stain on the regiment's honour. In combat the colours were carried by ensigns, the most junior and often youngest of the regiment's officers and were placed in the front and centre of the unit. Because of their value and conspicuity the ensigns faced considerable risk. To assist the ensigns (who were often just 16 years old) in handling the heavy flags and to protect the colours a number of experienced sergeants, armed with spontoons, were assigned to the colour party. From 1813 a new rank, colour sergeant, was introduced for these men as a mark of honour. If the colour party took casualties other officers, sergeants and, if necessary, other ranks would take their place. At the 1815 Battle of Waterloo 14 sergeants of the 40th (the 2nd Somersetshire) Regiment of Foot were killed or wounded while serving in the colour party and at the 1854 Battle of the Alma the colour party of the 21st (Royal North British Fusilier) Regiment of Foot lost 3 officers and 17 sergeants.

Colours were first regulated by order of George II in 1747. The recent Jacobite rising of 1745 had prompted the king to set in place army reforms to standardise uniforms, drill and tactics. He was keen to ensure the soldiers' loyalty to the crown rather than the colonel of their regiment (regiments up to this time were known by their colonel's name rather than an ordinal number). The colours of line infantry regiments had previously varied in number and design according to the whims of their colonel; many bore the personal arms of their commander, rather than any national or royal insignia. George's reforms standardised the colours to two per regiment: a "king's colour" (known as a "royal" or "queen's colour" during the reign of a queen), based on the Union Flag and a "second colour" (later known as the "regimental colour") with a field in the colour of the regiment's facings defaced by the new regimental numbers. It was common for infantry colours to be consecrated by an Anglican priest, and by 1825 it became the norm that colours would be consecrated when being formally presented to the regiment, though there were exceptions.

== Preventing capture ==
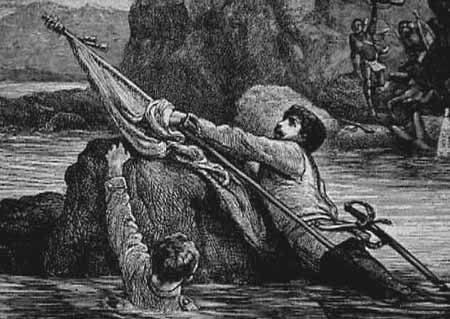
An 1879 depiction of Lieutenants Melville and Coghill dying to save the queen's colour of the 1st battalion, 24th Regiment at the Battle of Isandlwana

Regiments usually took great care to avoid their colours from falling into the hands of the enemy. During the surrender at Saratoga the colours of the 9th Regiment of Foot were smuggled back to England by their colonel, which was viewed by the Americans as a violation of the terms of the surrender. The colours of the 94th Regiment of Foot were saved during the surrender following the 1880 Battle of Bronkhorstspruit by being hidden beneath the bed of a wounded soldier's wife, in an ambulance allowed to return to British lines. On other occasions the colours have been deliberately destroyed to prevent their capture. The colours of the 51st (2nd Yorkshire West Riding) Regiment of Foot (Light Infantry) were burnt by their colonel at the 1811 Battle of Fuentes de Oñoro when he feared they were at risk of capture and on several occasions regiments threatened with capture while being transported at sea have weighted their colours and thrown them overboard. On some occasions regiments have been offered the right to keep their colours during surrender negotiations, such was the case with the colours of the 4th, 23rd, 24th and 34th regiments of foot who retained their colours after the 1782 surrender of Minorca. Despite the value placed on them colours were sometimes lost off the battlefield, the 71st (Highland) Regiment of Foot (MacLeod's Highlanders) left them at their depot in Britain during the Peninsular War but could not find them upon their return; a light infantry regiment lost one colour in the post during the 19th century.

The colours of units fighting in open order as light infantry were particularly vulnerable to attack and, as early as 1808, many such units did not carry their colours in the field. In battle the colours were sometimes sent to the rear if they were considered to be at risk or attracting too much enemy fire. Sometimes commanders considered the carrying of colours to be a hindrance to their units and ordered them left behind, as did General James Abercrombie during the 1758 Ticonderoga campaign. By the 1860s many infantry regiments posted on active service chose to leave their colours safely behind at their depots.

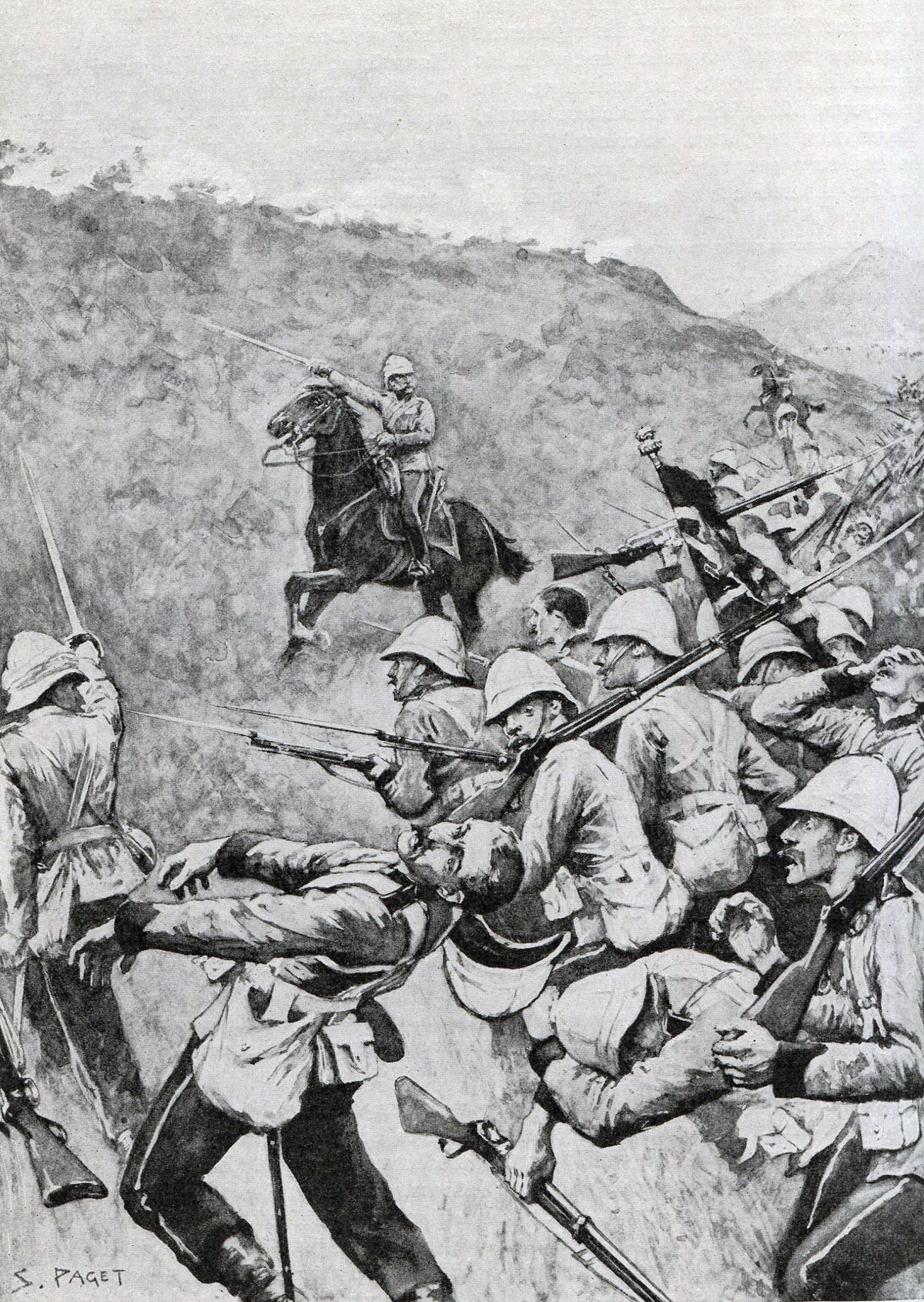
A colour of the 58th during their attack at Laing's Nek

After the loss of the colours of the 24th (The 2nd Warwickshire) Regiment of Foot at the 1879 Battle of Isandlwana there were debates in parliament as to whether colours should continue to be carried in the field. These were renewed after the heavy casualties suffered by the colour party of the 58th (Rutlandshire) Regiment of Foot at the 28 January 1881 Battle of Laing's Nek; British General Garnet Wolseley remarked that after this engagement any colonel that ordered the colours to be carried into action should be tried for the murders of the men lost carrying them. The action led to the Secretary of State for War Hugh Childers issuing instructions on 29 July that colours were no longer to be taken into the field. This was reinforced by a 2 March 1882 order from the Commander-in-Chief of the Forces, the Duke of Cambridge, that regiments posted on active service leave their colours behind. The colours of the 58th at Laing's Nek became the last to be carried into battle and those of the 1st battalion of the South Staffordshire Regiment the last to be taken on active service when they were at Alexandria in 1882.

== Units without colours ==
Only the flags of British infantry regiments are known as colours, the flags of British cavalry regiments are called standards; these were not consecrated, and do not seem to have attracted the same level of veneration as their infantry counterparts. From the early 19th century it became increasingly rare for cavalry standards to be taken into battle; very few were carried during the Peninsular War, for example. The light dragoons (a class of light cavalry that also included hussars and lancers) ceased to carry any standards after 1834, as by this time they fought most often as skirmishers in open order and hence would not be able to protect their standard.

Infantry regiments lost their colours when designated as rifle units, which were intended to fight in skirmish order; this includes the 95th (Rifle) Regiment of Foot, the 60th (Royal American) Regiment of Foot and their modern-day successor The Rifles. The Marines (from 1802 the Royal Marines), were organised into companies with only their administrative divisions receiving colours, which were not carried in the field. The Royal Artillery did not carry colours, with their guns being considered the equivalent.

== List ==
This is a list of colours lost on the battlefield, or surrendered immediately afterwards, by infantry regiments of the British army since the 1747 reforms. Colours temporarily lost and recovered in the course of the battle are not listed. The list does not include units of the East India Company armies (and later the British Indian Army), colonial troops or militia.

Image	Date	Unit	Colour	Battle	War	Captured by	Notes	Ref
	14 August 1756	50th Regiment of Foot (American Provincials)	King's colour and regimental colour	Battle of Fort Oswego	Seven Years' War	France	These two units were ranked as regular regiments of foot but consisted of raw recruits from the colonies. They were disbanded shortly after the surrender at Fort Oswego. Two of these colours were recovered by British forces during the September 1760 capture of Montreal.	
	14 August 1756	51st Regiment of Foot (Cape Breton Regiment)	King's colour and regimental colour	Battle of Fort Oswego	Seven Years' War	France	These two units were ranked as regular regiments of foot but consisted of raw recruits from the colonies. They were disbanded shortly after the surrender at Fort Oswego. Two of these colours were recovered by British forces during the September 1760 capture of Montreal.	
	15 October 1760	Unknown regiment	Unknown colour	Battle of Kloster Kampen	Seven Years' War	France		
	20 October 1775	7th Regiment of Foot (Royal Fusiliers)	Regimental colour	Surrender of Fort Chamblé	American War of Independence	Thirteen Colonies	Only one company of the regiment was present at this action	
Surrender of colours at Saratoga	17 October 1777	37th Regiment of Foot	King's colour and regimental colour	Surrender at Saratoga	American War of Independence	United States of America	Other regiments, including the 9th and 62nd Regiments of Foot, successfully concealed their colours and returned them to Britain. Other colours were sent in the personal baggage of General John Burgoyne.	
	1777-8	81st Regiment of Foot (Aberdeenshire Highland Regiment)	King's colour and regimental colour	At sea between Britain and Ireland	American War of Independence	United States of America	Captured by a privateer, possibly John Paul Jones	
	16 July 1779	17th Regiment of Foot	King's colour and regimental colour	Battle of Stony Point	American War of Independence	United States of America		
	21 September 1779	16th Regiment of Foot	King's colour and regimental colour	Battle of Baton Rouge	American War of Independence	Spain		
The King's colour of the 7th Regiment is now exhibited at the West Point Museum	17 January 1781	7th Regiment of Foot	King's colour	Battle of Cowpens	American War of Independence	United States of America		
	8 September 1781	64th Regiment of Foot	King's colour (possible)	Battle of Eutaw Springs	American War of Independence	United States of America	The 64th Regiment returned from America without its King's colour, it was possibly lost when it was driven back at the Battle of Eutaw Springs	
A depiction of British colours (left) during the surrender at Yorktown	19 October 1781	43rd Regiment of Foot	King's colour and regimental colour (possible)	Surrender at Yorktown	American War of Independence	United States of America, France	The 43rd Regiment later claimed its colours weren't lost and had been left at the depot in New York. The 23rd Foot (Royal Welsh Fuzileers) and 33rd Regiment of Foot also surrendered at Yorktown but are believed to have hidden their colours beforehand. In addition to the British regiments 18 colours were captured from Hessian, Ansbach and Bayreuth units.	
A depiction of British colours (left) during the surrender at Yorktown	19 October 1781	76th Regiment of Foot (MacDonald's Highlanders)	King's colour and regimental colour	Surrender at Yorktown	American War of Independence	United States of America, France	The 43rd Regiment later claimed its colours weren't lost and had been left at the depot in New York. The 23rd Foot (Royal Welsh Fuzileers) and 33rd Regiment of Foot also surrendered at Yorktown but are believed to have hidden their colours beforehand. In addition to the British regiments 18 colours were captured from Hessian, Ansbach and Bayreuth units.	
A depiction of British colours (left) during the surrender at Yorktown	19 October 1781	80th Regiment of Foot (Royal Edinburgh Volunteers)	King's colour and regimental colour	Surrender at Yorktown	American War of Independence	United States of America, France	The 43rd Regiment later claimed its colours weren't lost and had been left at the depot in New York. The 23rd Foot (Royal Welsh Fuzileers) and 33rd Regiment of Foot also surrendered at Yorktown but are believed to have hidden their colours beforehand. In addition to the British regiments 18 colours were captured from Hessian, Ansbach and Bayreuth units.	
	26/27 November 1781	15th Regiment of Foot	King's colour and regimental colour	French capture of Sint Eustatius	Anglo-French War (1778–1783)	France		
	26/27 November 1781	13th Regiment of Foot	King's colour and regimental colour	French capture of Sint Eustatius	Anglo-French War (1778–1783)	France		
	3 May 1783	98th Regiment of Foot	King's colour and regimental colour	Siege of Bednore	Second Anglo-Mysore War	Mysore, France		
	3 May 1783	100th Regiment of Foot (Loyal Lincolnshire Regiment)	King's colour and regimental colour	Siege of Bednore	Second Anglo-Mysore War	Mysore, France		
	3 May 1783	102nd Regiment of Foot	King's colour and regimental colour	Siege of Bednore	Second Anglo-Mysore War	Mysore, France		
	1794	43rd (Monmouthshire) Regiment of Foot	King's colour and regimental colour	Invasion of Guadeloupe	War of the First Coalition	France		
	1794	65th (2nd Yorkshire, North Riding) Regiment of Foot	King's colour and regimental colour	Invasion of Guadeloupe	War of the First Coalition	France		
King's colour (left) and regimental colour (right)	11 August 1806	2nd battalion, 71st (Highland) Regiment of Foot (MacLeod's Highlanders)	King's colour and regimental colour	First British occupation of Buenos Aires	Anglo-Spanish War (1796–1808)	Spain		
The Buffs defend their colours at Albuera	16 May 1811	1st battalion, 3rd Regiment of Foot, "The Buffs"	Part of the regimental colour (staff, cords and part of flag lost, later recovered in counterattack)	Battle of Albuera	Peninsular War	France	The regimental colour was lost to a French attack but most of the flag was recovered in a counterattack by the 7th Regiment of Foot	
The Buffs defend their colours at Albuera	16 May 1811	2nd battalion, 48th (Northamptonshire) Regiment of Foot	King's colour and regimental colour	Battle of Albuera	Peninsular War	France		
The Buffs defend their colours at Albuera	16 May 1811	2nd battalion, 66th (Berkshire) Regiment of Foot	King's colour	Battle of Albuera	Peninsular War	France		
	22 July 1812	2nd battalion, 53rd (Shropshire) Regiment of Foot	Part of the King's colour (staff and some of the flag lost)	Battle of Salamanca	Peninsular War	France		
Two of the colours during the Siege of Bergen op Zoom	8 March 1814	2nd battalion, 1st Regiment of Foot Guards	Unknown	Siege of Bergen op Zoom	War of the Sixth Coalition	France	Source just states "colours" lost. The Foot Guards of this period carried three king's colours: the colonel's, lieutenant-colonel's and major's colours. Unlike the king's colours of line regiments these had plain crimson fields. Each company also had a colour which was the union flag defaced with a badge, the 1st Foot Guards had 24 of these, one of which was carried in rotation as the regimental colour.	
Two of the colours during the Siege of Bergen op Zoom	8 March 1814	4th battalion, 1st (Royal) Regiment of Foot	King's colour and regimental colour	Siege of Bergen op Zoom	War of the Sixth Coalition	France	The colours were weighted and thrown into the River Zoom by the regiment's adjutant in an attempt to save them from capture but were afterwards recovered by the French.	
Two of the colours during the Siege of Bergen op Zoom	8 March 1814	2nd battalion, 69th (South Lincolnshire) Regiment of Foot	Regimental colour	Siege of Bergen op Zoom	War of the Sixth Coalition	France		
	16 June 1815	2nd battalion, 69th (South Lincolnshire) Regiment of Foot	King's colour	Battle of Quatre Bras	Hundred Days	France	The colour came into the possession of General François-Xavier Donzelot who commanded the 2nd Infantry Division during the battle. It was inherited by his grandson who gave them away in payment for a debt. In 1909 the colour was sold to a British captain on holiday and returned to the regimental museum. The colour is now in the collection of the Regimental Museum of The Royal Welsh.	
King's colour carried by battalions of the King's German Legion	18 June 1815	5th Kings German Legion Line Battalion	King's colour	Battle of Waterloo	War of the Seventh Coalition	France		
King's colour carried by battalions of the King's German Legion	18 June 1815	8th Kings German Legion Line Battalion	King's colour	Battle of Waterloo	War of the Seventh Coalition	France		
The last stand of the 44th, the regimental colour is shown wrapped around Souter's waist	13 January 1842	44th (East Essex) Regiment of Foot	Queen's colour and regimental colour	Last stand at Jugdulluk	First Anglo-Afghan War	Afghanistan	Knowing they would be overrun by the Afghan forces Captain Souter and Lieutenant Cumberland took the colours from their staffs and tried to wrap them around their bodies. Cumberland was unable to button his coat over the queen's colour and handed it to Colour-Sergeant Carey who hid it under his sheepskin coat. Carey was killed and the colour lost, but Souter was captured by the Afghans who thought him worthy of ransom after mistaking the bright yellow colour for expensive clothing. Souter brought the regimental colour back with him when he was released some months later.	
The 24th advance at Chillianwala	13 January 1849	24th (The 2nd Warwickshire) Regiment of Foot	Queen's colour	Battle of Chillianwala	Second Anglo-Sikh War	Sikh Empire	The colour was separated from its staff and carried by the wounded Private Battlestone during the retreat. Having refused to give up the colours to his comrades Battlestone fell dead, unnoticed. The colour was not found by the British the following morning; as it was not paraded by the Sikhs as a trophy it was perhaps taken by local villagers or camp followers. The battle was among the worst on record for losses of British colours, with nine from the British Indian units also lost.	
A depiction of a last stand around the regimental colour of the 2nd battalion, though there is no evidence that the colours were unfurled during the battle.	22 January 1879	24th (The 2nd Warwickshire) Regiment of Foot	Queen's colour and regimental colour	Battle of Isandlwana	Anglo-Zulu War	Zulu Kingdom	Both colours of the 2nd battalion were lost on the battlefield, though part of one pole and a crown finial were recovered separately later.The queen's colour of the 1st battalion was also present at the battle; it was brought away by Lieutenants Melville and Coghill who were killed in their attempted flight. The colour was found in the Buffalo River by British forces on 4 February, near to where they died.	
	27 July 1880	66th (Berkshire) Regiment of Foot	Queen's colour and regimental colour	Battle of Maiwand	Second Anglo-Afghan War	Afghanistan	This was the last loss of British colours.	
