= Le Couteur =

Le Couteur is a surname, and may refer to:

- Caroline Le Couteur (born 1952), Australian politician
- George Le Couteur (1915–1978), Australian wool broker, economist and company director
- Jean Le Couteur (1916–2010), French architect
- John Le Couteur (general) (1760–1835), British military officer and colonial official
- John Le Couteur (1794–1875), British Army officer
- Kenneth Le Couteur (1920–2011), British physicist
- Philip Le Couteur (1885–1958), Australian philosopher and educator
