= Siege of Mangalore =

Event in the Second Anglo-Mysore War

Coordinates: 12°54′07″N 74°49′31″E

- Part of the Second Anglo-Mysore War
Date	20 May 1783 – 30 January 1784 (8 months and 10 days)
Location	Mangalore, India
Result	Mysore victory

Belligerents
Great Britain: British East India Company	Sultanate of Mysore

Commanders and leaders
(Kingdom of Great Britain) John Campbell	Tipu Sultan

Strength
700 British and 2,000 Indian troops	100,000

Casualties and losses
1,950	Unknown

The siege of Mangalore was conducted during the Second Anglo-Mysore War by Tipu Sultan and forces of the Kingdom of Mysore against a British East India Company garrison led by Colonel John Campbell. The port city of Mangalore on the west coast of India was besieged from 20 May 1783 until the garrison capitulated on 30 January 1784 after being reduced to starvation; of the original garrison of 700 British soldiers and 2000 Indian troops there were only 850 survivors. The siege was one of the last major actions of the war; Mangalore was where the treaty ending the war was signed in March 1784.
