= John Le Couteur (British Army officer, born 1760) =

Lieutenant-General John Le Couteur
- Born: 26 August 1760; Jersey
- Died: 23 April 1835 (aged 74); Jersey
- Military career
- Allegiance: United Kingdom
- Branch: British Army
- Conflicts: Second Anglo-Mysore War, Napoleonic Wars

Lieutenant-General John Le Couteur (1760–1835), a Jersey native, was a British military officer and colonial official. He was the father of the eponymous John Le Couteur (1794–1875).

== Early life and service in India ==
A member of a prominent Jersey family, John Le Couteur was the son of John Le Couteur (1718–1794), and Marie Bertault. Educated at the Royal Grammar School, Guildford, he obtained an ensigncy by purchase in the old 95th Foot in 1780, and served under Major Francis Peirson during the January 1781 Battle of Jersey. The same year, Le Couteur was promoted lieutenant in the old 100th Foot and was sent out with that regiment to India. While in the subcontinent, he was involved in operations against Hyder Ali during the Second Anglo-Mysore War. He was appointed brigade-major to Colonel Thomas Humberston and later served with General Matthews in Malabar. He was taken prisoner at the Siege of Bednore in April 1783 by Tipu Sultan, and, following nearly a year of harsh imprisonment, was released following the Treaty of Mangalore in March 1784. Le Couteur described his campaigns in Letters, Chiefly from India, giving an Account of the Military Transactions on the Coast of Malabar during the late War (1790).

== Return to Jersey ==
Le Couteur became captain-lieutenant in 1784, and captain in 1785, when the 100th was disbanded and he was placed on half-pay. Le Couteur returned to Jersey and became adjutant in the Jersey militia in 1787. In 1793 he married Marie (1774–1845), daughter of Sir John Dumaresq; they had two sons. He was brought on full pay in the 11th Foot in 1793, and made brigade-major of the Jersey militia, where he gained a reputation as an energetic reformer. Between 1793 and 1795, he was charged with maintaining confidential contacts, via Jersey, between the British government and French royalists.

He was promoted to major in the 16th Foot in 1797, but remained on the staff in Jersey until 1798, when he joined his regiment in Scotland as a brevet lieutenant-colonel. He was appointed inspecting-officer of militia in Jersey the following year, and was assistant quartermaster-general on the island during the detention on Jersey of Russian troops from the Texel in 1799–1800. He remained inspector of militia for twelve years. In 1811, Le Couteur was appointed a major-general on the staff in Ireland, and afterwards in Jamaica, where he led a brigade for two and a half years.

== Curaçao ==
Le Couteur was appointed lieutenant-governor of Curaçao and its dependent islands in 1813, which he found on the verge of starvation. Curaçao, off the Venezuelan coast, was an important Caribbean commercial centre, but Anglo-American War of 1812 prevented the arrival of corn from Britain, and the orders in council banned the importation of foreign grain. Le Couteur set aside the orders to stave off famine. When the island was returned to the Dutch after the peace in 1815, the legislative bodies, the inhabitants, and Spanish refugees presented Le Couteur with addresses acknowledging the important services he had rendered to the colony. Le Couteur declined the Duke of York's offer to recommend him for command of a regiment, claiming he did not feel entitled to the honour as long as Peninsular officers remained unprovided for.

== Retirement and death ==
He retired to Belle Vue, the home he had bought in Saint Aubin, Jersey in 1792. Le Couteur became a lieutenant-general in 1821, and died aged 74 on 23 April 1835. He was buried at St Brelade's churchyard on 27 March.

== Family and legacy ==
Le Couteur was father of Colonel John Le Couteur, whose well-known memoirs of his War of 1812 service in the 104th Foot were edited and published by Donald Graves in 1993 as Merry Hearts Make Light Days. The younger John Le Couteur also dabbled in agricultural science in later life, was elected as a Fellow of the Royal Society in 1843, and served as an aide-de-camp to William IV and Victoria.
