= Siege of Bednore =

Military engagement during the Anglo-Mysore war

- Part of the Second Anglo-Mysore War
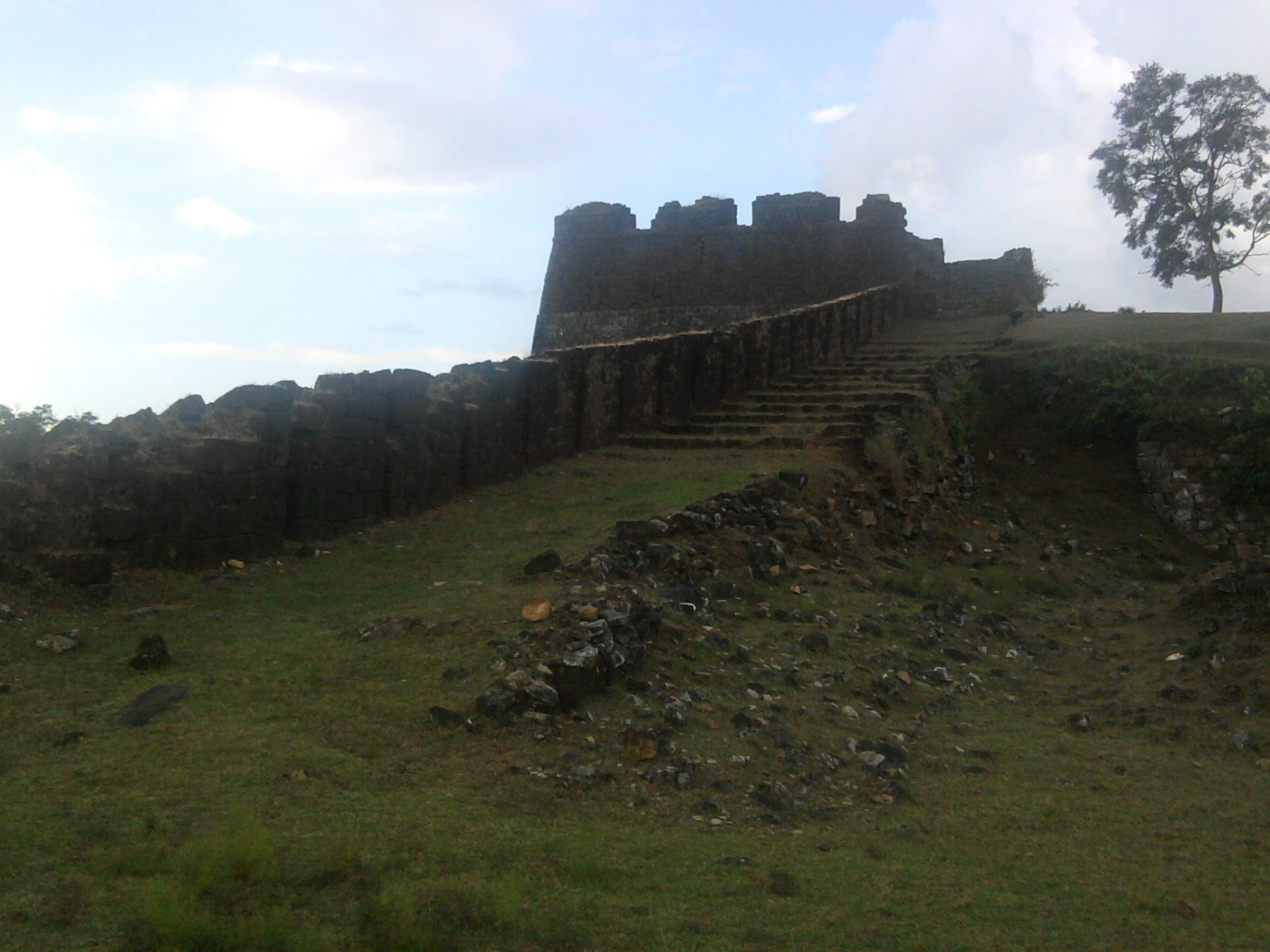
- Remains of Bednore fort
Date	9 April – 28 April 1783
Location	Bednore (modern day Nagara), India 13.8205°N 75.0345°E
Result	Franco-Mysorean victory

Belligerents
Great Britain: British East India Company	Sultanate of Mysore; France

Commanders and leaders
(Kingdom of Great Britain) Richard Matthews	Tipu Sultan

Strength
600 Europeans and 1,000 Indian sepoys	2,000 French and 100,000 Mysore troops

Casualties and losses
500	Unknown

The siege of Bednore was a battle of the Second Anglo-Mysore War. The British had captured Bednore (modern day Nagara) and other strongholds in the Malabar coast from Mysore in early 1783, while the Mysore leader, Tipu Sultan, was leading his army on campaign in the Carnatic. The British commander, Brigadier-General Richard Matthews, formed a small garrison of 1,600 men at Bednore and split the remainder of the force into detachments to plunder the surrounding region. Tipu Sultan brought his army of more than 100,000 men west and managed to approach within 6 kilometres (4 mi) of Bednore undetected by 9 April. Matthews deployed his troops in the field outside of Bednore and was swiftly defeated. Matthews abandoned the town and retreated to the fort which was quickly besieged by the Mysore army.

Matthews lost much of his ammunition in the retreat and was short of provisions. Suffering losses from disease, he arranged a ceasefire with the Mysore on 24 April and surrendered on 28 April. The terms of the surrender were generous allowing the garrison to march out with all the honours of war, providing free passage to Bombay and allowing the officers to retain their personal property. However Matthews divided the garrison's treasury, which should have been surrendered, among his officers which outraged the Mysoreans. Matthews and 19 of his most senior officers were seized and later poisoned and searches recovered the bulk of the missing treasure. The junior officers were marched to Chittledroog and mistreatment resulted in some deaths. Sepoy non-commissioned officers who refused to join the Mysore army were thought, by the British officers, to have been murdered. Surviving prisoners were released in March 1784 under the Treaty of Mangalore.

== Background ==
Bednore (today known as Nagara) lies in the Malabar Coast region of South-Western India. It was a traditional stronghold of the Nayakas of Keladi until they were defeated by Hyder Ali in 1763 and the territory incorporated into the Kingdom of Mysore. Ali looted the town of £12 million and renamed it as Hydernuggur. The area was afterwards peaceful until the Second Anglo-Mysore War (1780-84) between Ali (and his son Tipu Sultan) and the British (and the East India Company). In early 1783 while Tipu Sultan's army was fighting in the Carnatic region near India's east coast the East India Company sent Brigadier-General Richard Matthews with part of the Bombay Army to the Malabar Coast. Matthews captured all the Mysore forces in the region and set about looting the area, splitting his force into small detachments to cover a wide area.

== Siege ==
Tipu Sultan decided to cut short his campaign in the Carnatic and return to the Malabar Coast with his army. Matthews' troops were thinly spread and more intent on plunder than reconnaissance. Tipu Sultan's army, consisting of 2,000 French regulars and 100,000 Indian troops, was not spotted until 9 April when it was at Fattiput, just 6 kilometres (4 mi) from Bednore. Matthews was unable to bring his detachments together in time but chose to face Tipu Sultan in the field at an open plain in front of Bednore. Matthews' army, some 600 European troops and 1,000 Indian sepoys, suffered 500 casualties within minutes and, abandoning the town, he retreated to the fort.

Much of the garrison's ammunition was stored in the town and this was lost in the retreat. The defenders were also low on provisions and little work had been done to improve the fort's ruined defences. The Mysore army brought up their artillery and began a siege of the fort.

With disease reducing his number Matthews arranged a ceasefire with Tipu Sultan on 24 April. Two days later he held a council of war with his officers, at which they agreed to surrender terms. The terms agreed with the Mysore included free passage for the British force to Bombay, with safe transport for their sick and wounded, and retention of arms for 100 sepoys to act as an escort as far as Sadashagur, where they would embark for Bombay. On 28 April the British garrison marched out with all the honours of war, and piled their arms on the fort's glacis.

== Aftermath ==
The British garrison was marched, under guard, about 800 metres (0.5 mi) to a water tank (reservoir) where they were held for some days. On 1 May the enlisted men, their wives and camp followers were searched and any valuables taken by the Mysore army. The officers had been permitted to retain their personal property but all public property was to have been turned over. The garrison's treasury, including plunder, had been divided by Matthews among the officers. Matthews and some of his senior officers were summoned to meet Tipu Sultan on a pretext and were seized. A search recovered the bulk of the missing treasury and Matthews and the 19 most senior officers were killed by poisoning.

The sick and wounded at Bednore were mistreated by the Mysore army, being tipped from their litters. The King's and regimental colours of the 98th Regiment of Foot, 100th Regiment of Foot (Loyal Lincolnshire Regiment) and the 102nd Regiment of Foot were seized on 3 May.

The 34 junior British officers (subalterns) were chained and fettered and marched to confinement at Chittledroog (modern day Chitradurga). They were mistreated and some died en-route. John Le Couteur, who later became a general, was among the junior officers and, in 1790, published an account of the Malabar campaign. The officers were offered their freedom if they agreed to serve in the Mysore Army but none chose to do so. A number of sepoy non-commissioned officers who refused to defect were presumed to have been murdered. The officers considered that they were also to have been murdered but that the order to do so was countermanded when peace negotiations opened between the British and the Tipu Sultan. The surviving prisoners were released in March 1784 under the terms of the Treaty of Mangalore.
