= John Campbell of Stonefield =

British Army officer (1753–1784)

John Campbell, of Stonefield
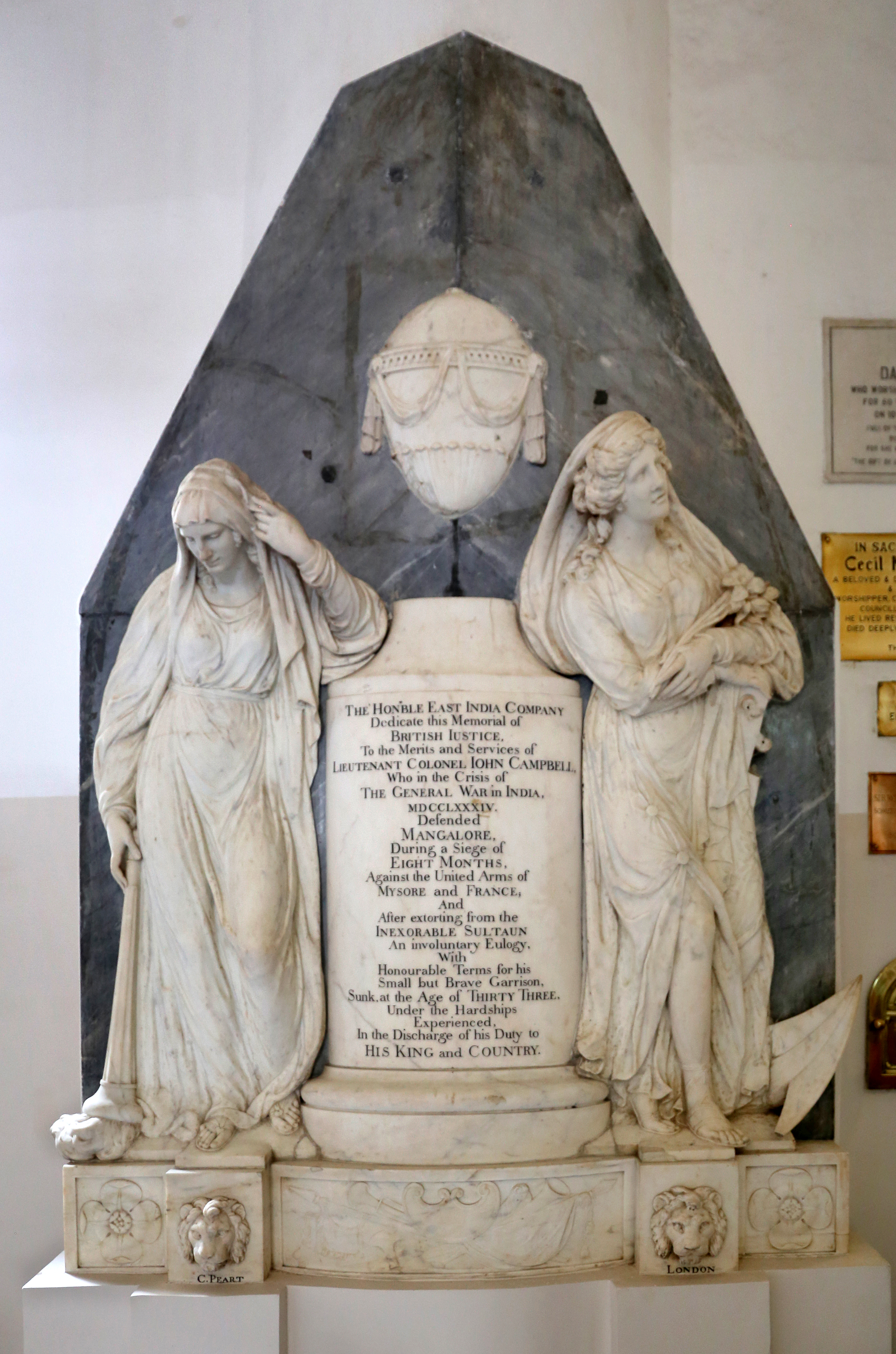
- Born: 7 December 1753; Dumbarton, Scotland
- Died: 23 March 1784 (aged 30); Bombay, India
- Occupation: British Army officer
- Known for: Defence of Mangalore

Lieutenant-Colonel John Campbell, of Stonefield (1753–1784) was a Scottish soldier known for his defence of Mangalore.

== Early life ==
John Campbell was born at Dumbarton on 7 December 1753, the second son of John Campbell of Stonefield (d. 1801), a judge of the Court of Session, and Lady Grace Stuart (1725–1783), sister to John Stuart, 3rd Earl of Bute. He was educated (1759–1763) at the Royal High School, Edinburgh.

== American Revolutionary War ==
Campbell joined the army as an ensign of the 37th Regiment of Foot on 25 June 1771 and was appointed lieutenant in the 7th Fusiliers on 9 May 1774, serving in Quebec, where he was taken prisoner in the Siege of Fort St. Jean in 1775. On his release he continued his American war service in the 71st Regiment of Foot (Fraser's Highlanders), being appointed a captain in December 1775, and a major of the 74th Regiment of Foot (Argyleshire Highlanders) in December 1777.

== Second Mysore War ==
Campbell returned to England in 1780 and transferred into the 100th Regiment of Foot, as a major and then a lieutenant-colonel from 19 February 1781.

Having been diverted from the Cape to the defence of India, he disembarked with his troops at Bombay on 26 January 1782, and subsequently transferred to the 2nd battalion Black Watch, assuming its command in the Second Mysore War.

Early in 1783, Campbell distinguished himself in a successful engagement against Tipu Sultan at Paniana, receiving a serious wound. Forces under his command thereafter stormed the fort of Anantapur on the Malabar coast.

== Siege of Mangalore ==
In May 1783 the Commander-in-Chief, Brigadier-General Richard Matthews, was accused of procrastination and suspended by the Government of Bombay, and Campbell received provisional command of the 1883-strong garrison at the strategic fort of Mangalore, but was soon after cut off by large concentrations of the enemy advancing from Bednore.

Campbell held Mangalore against Tipu's direct assault from 23 May to 2 August 1783, in the course of which the embattled garrison suffered 749 killed or wounded. Campbell then accepted a truce, and the siege was converted to a blockade which continued until 24 January 1784, by which time deprivations and exposure had further reduced the garrison to 856 men fit for duty. Campbell's defence of Mangalore won a valuable respite for the British position in India by occupying almost the whole of Tipu's forces, contemporaneously reckoned at 140,000 men with 100 artillery pieces, for eight months. On 30 January 1783 the defenders capitulated to Tipu on excellent terms, and embarked for Tellicherry with the full honours of war.

== Death ==
Campbell died at Bombay of consumption aggravated by fatigue on 23 March 1784. He was buried in St. Thomas Cathedral, Mumbai, in a monument sculpted by Charles Peart.
