= 100th Regiment of Foot (Loyal Lincolnshire Regiment) =

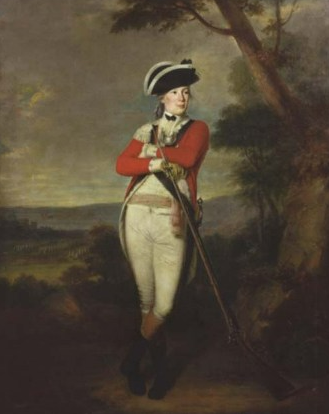
- Captain John Alston of the 100th Regiment; painting by John Trotter, circa 1780.
- Active: 1780–1785
- Country: United Kingdom
- Branch: British Army
- Type: Line Infantry
- Size: One battalion
- Engagements: Second Anglo-Mysore War * Siege of Bednore * Siege of Mangalore

The 100th Regiment of Foot, or the Loyal Lincolnshire Regiment, was an infantry regiment of the British Army, formed in 1780 and disbanded in 1785. Despite the name, the regiment was primarily recruited in the Highlands of Scotland. It sailed for India in 1781, with the troop convoy encountering a French fleet in the Battle of Porto Praya. After arrival, it served in the Second Anglo-Mysore War from 1782 to 1784. Detachments of the regiment were present in the garrisons at the Siege of Bednore and Siege of Mangalore, where they took heavy losses. The regiment returned to England in 1784 and was disbanded the following year.

== History ==
The regiment was raised for service in India by Colonel Thomas Humberston. In 1778, Humberston had assisted his cousin, the Earl of Seaforth and chief of Clan Mackenzie, to raise the 78th Regiment of Foot, recruited from among the Seaforth estates in the Highlands of Scotland.

The new regiment had an authorised strength of five companies of 100 men each; five more were authorised in August 1780, including a grenadier company. Recruiting began in England but, as with Humberston's previous recruiting for the 78th, took place mostly in Scotland. The regiment was stationed at Inverness and then Dundee, from where they sailed south to England. When leaving Dundee, it was noted that "the behaviour of the privates has been irreproachable", with no complaints from the town. The regiment wore standard red uniforms with white facings; the buttons of the coat carried a Roman numeral "C", rather than "100", for the regimental number.

Prior to leaving England, they were reviewed in Hyde Park by King George III. The 100th sailed from Portsmouth as part of William Medows' expedition to attack the Cape of Good Hope in March 1781. While en route, the expedition clashed with a French squadron sent to reinforce the Cape, with an inconclusive engagement at the Battle of Porto Praya; the regiment lost 28 men. On arrival at the Cape, it was found to be too heavily defended to attack, and the expedition proceeded to India, arriving at Bombay (now Mumbai) in early 1782 for service in the Second Anglo-Mysore War.

The 100th were sent to operate from Calicut (now Kozhikode) in Kerala, and along with a small group of locally raised sepoy troops, fought two successful battles against Mysore forces there. They were then deployed to Panianee to continue diversionary operations on the west coast, but had to fall back when confronted with a larger army led by Tipu Sultan. On 29 November 1782 the 100th and the 2nd Battalion of the 42nd Highlanders repelled an attack on Panianee, with five officers and 33 men of the 100th killed and wounded.

Humberston learned in November 1782 that following the death of his cousin, Kenneth Mackenzie, 1st Earl of Seaforth, he had been appointed to succeed him as colonel of the 78th Highlanders. Rather than depart, however, he stayed with the 100th. Thomas Bruce was appointed colonel-commandant of the 100th. Humberston remained with the 100th, however, until his ship was captured while sailing from Bombay in April 1783; he was seriously injured, and died in captivity three weeks later. Another officer of the 100th, Major Shaw, and several men of the regiment were killed at the same time.

In early 1783 a detachment of the 100th was part of the force which captured Bednore (modern Nagara). It was then besieged there in April at the Siege of Bednore, and taken prisoner when the fortress surrendered on 28 April. A second detachment was part of the defending force at the Siege of Mangalore, which was besieged from May 1783 until it surrendered on 30 January 1784; the defenders were allowed to retreat.

A peace treaty was signed in March 1784. Following this, the regiment returned to England and was disbanded at Chatham in late 1785, though some of the last groups of men did not arrive until early 1786. Those men who wished to remain with the army in India rather than return home were transferred to the 78th Highlanders as volunteers. In total, 39 officers and around 1,200 men were killed or died of disease during the regiment's service in India. In December 1781, a recruiting company had been formed in England by transferring the 2nd recruiting company of the 102nd Regiment. It remained there and was disbanded in October 1783.

Officers of the regiment included John Le Couteur, later lieutenant-governor of Curaçao, and Thomas Russell, who would later become a founder of the United Irishmen and was executed following the Irish rebellion of 1803.

The "Loyal Lincolnshire" title was used unofficially when the regiment was first being raised by Humberston in Lincolnshire, before it was taken onto the establishment and numbered as the 100th Foot. It is not clear if the title was ever used after that. The title was later reused by the 123rd Regiment, raised in 1794 and disbanded in 1796.

== Sources ==
- Baldry, W. Y.; White, A. S. (1922). "DISBANDED REGIMENTS. The 100th Foot". Journal of the Society for Army Historical Research. 1 (5): 205–211. ISSN 0037-9700.
- Carman, W. Y. (1982). "Major Henry Rooke of the 3rd King's Own Dragoons". Journal of the Society for Army Historical Research. 60 (244): 209–212. ISSN 0037-9700.
- Cormack, Andrew (1996). "Captain John Alston". Journal of the Society for Army Historical Research. 74 (299): 141–143. ISSN 0037-9700.
- Rickword, G. O. (1946). "629. the Loyal Lincolnshire Regiment, 1780". Journal of the Society for Army Historical Research. 24 (100): 208–208. ISSN 0037-9700.
- Whitton, Frederick Ernest (1924). The History of the Prince of Wales's Leinster Regiment (Royal Canadians): Volume 1: The Old Army.
