= 98th Regiment of Foot (1780) =

- Active: 1780–1785
- Country: Kingdom of Great Britain (1707–1800)
- Branch: British Army
- Type: Infantry

Commanders
- Colonel of the Regiment: Colonel William Fullarton

The 98th Regiment of Foot (1780–1785) was a short-lived infantry regiment in the British Army which was raised in England in 1780 as a infantry corps for service in India.

En route to India by sea the regiment was involved in the indecisive naval battle of Porto Praya in the Cape Verde Islands, where they had anchored to take on water. After arriving in India in 1781 the regiment took part in the Second Mysore war against the Kingdom of Mysore, but was obliged to surrender to the forces of Tipu Sultan at the siege of Bednore and were interned until the Treaty of Mangalore in 1784.

Following its release the regiment sailed home to England and were disbanded in 1785.

The Colonel-Commandant of the Regiment throughout its short life was Colonel William Fullarton, who was later made colonel of the 101st Foot.
