= Charles Peart =

British sculptor

- Born: 22 December 1759; Newton, Monmouth, Wales
- Died: 1798 (age about 38)
- Education: Royal Academy School
- Occupation: Sculptor

Charles Peart (22 December 1759 – 1798) was a British sculptor of the late 18th century.

== Life and career ==
Peart was born at Newton, a rural parish located immediately north-east of Monmouth

By 1778 he was in London, where he entered the Royal Academy School in 1781 and won a medal the following year for a bas-relief of Hercules and Omphale. After leaving the school, he worked as an assistant to John Charles Lochee and then as a modeller for Josiah Wedgwood, and was commissioned by the Marquess of Buckingham to carve a series of reliefs for his country house at Stowe. Some of this work was in partnership with the painter Vincenzo Valdré. From the late 1780s, he began working on designs for large monuments as well as portrait busts. The family connections of his wife Elizabeth with the East India Company led to him working on sculpture for monuments that were erected in India. These included memorials to Lieutenant-Colonel John Campbell in St. Thomas Cathedral, Mumbai; and another, at Fort St George, to Colonel Joseph Moorhouse who was killed at the Siege of Bangalore in 1791. In 1792, Peart provided a statue of Henry V above the entrance to the Shire Hall in the king's birthplace of Monmouth. Peart continued to work for Wedgwood, and also carved a marble chimneypiece for the Marquess of Buckingham's London residence in Pall Mall He died in 1798, leaving a widow, Elizabeth, and a young child.
