= Silpa Avenue Colony =

Shilpa Avenue Colony
- Location in Telangana, India
- Coordinates: 17.29°N 78.22°E
- Country: India
- State: Telangana
- District: Ranga Reddy
- Mandal: Kukatpally

Government
  - MLA: Sri M Krishna Rao, TDP
  - MP: Sri Malla Reddy, TDP

Population (2011)
  - Total: 6,139

Languages
  - Official: Telugu, Hindi
- Time zone: UTC+5:30 (IST)
- PIN: 500049

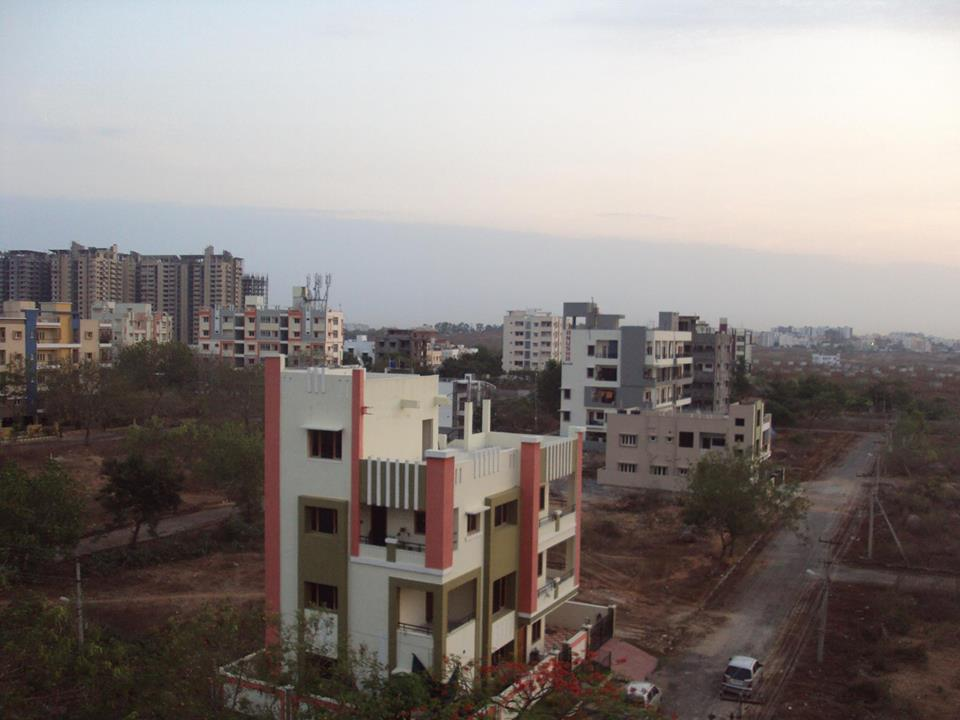
Silpa Avenue Colony View from Silpa Pearl Apartment

Silpa Avenue Colony, also Shilpa Avenue Colony, is a sublocality of Hafeezpet, Hyderabad, India, near Hydernagar. It is located 20.9 kilometres (12.9 mi) northwest of Hyderabad, is part of GHMC and 100% HUDA approved colony with 226 plots and six parks. Transportation is managed by UMTA.

It has six parks with two parks fully developed, upscale residential apartments and communities with Manjira Drinking Water Pipeline connection available. It is developing into a residential colony. The colony having all facilities like Shops, Parks, and also located having within 3 km radius Metro Rail, MMTS Rail, Farmers Market, Forum Mall, and Cinema Halls. Also the colony is surrounded by Miyapur on one side, Kondapur on another and also Hitech city on one side and Kukatpally on another side. It is designated as a "high-rise" zone and the demand for real-estate has skyrocketed.

== About Silpa Avenue Colony ==
=== Languages ===
Telugu is the Local Language here.

== Transport for Silpa Avenue Colony ==
=== Rail ===
Hafizpeta Rail Way Station and Hitech Rail Way Station are the very nearby railway stations to Silpa Avenue Colony. However, Secunderabad Central Railway Station is 18 km from Silpa Avenue Colony. Metro Railway Station is 1 km from Silpa Avenue Colony.

=== Local Bus ===
Hafeezpet Bus Stop Bus Station, Miyapur Bus Stop Bus Station, Miyapur X Roads Bus Station, Kondapur Bus Stop Bus Station, Hydernagar Bus Station are the nearby by Local Bus Stops to Silpa Avenue Colony .

==== Sujana Forum Mall ====
The Forum Sujana Mall is just 2 km from Silpa Avenue Colony
