= John Le Couteur =

British Army officer (1794–1875)

Sir John Le Couteur
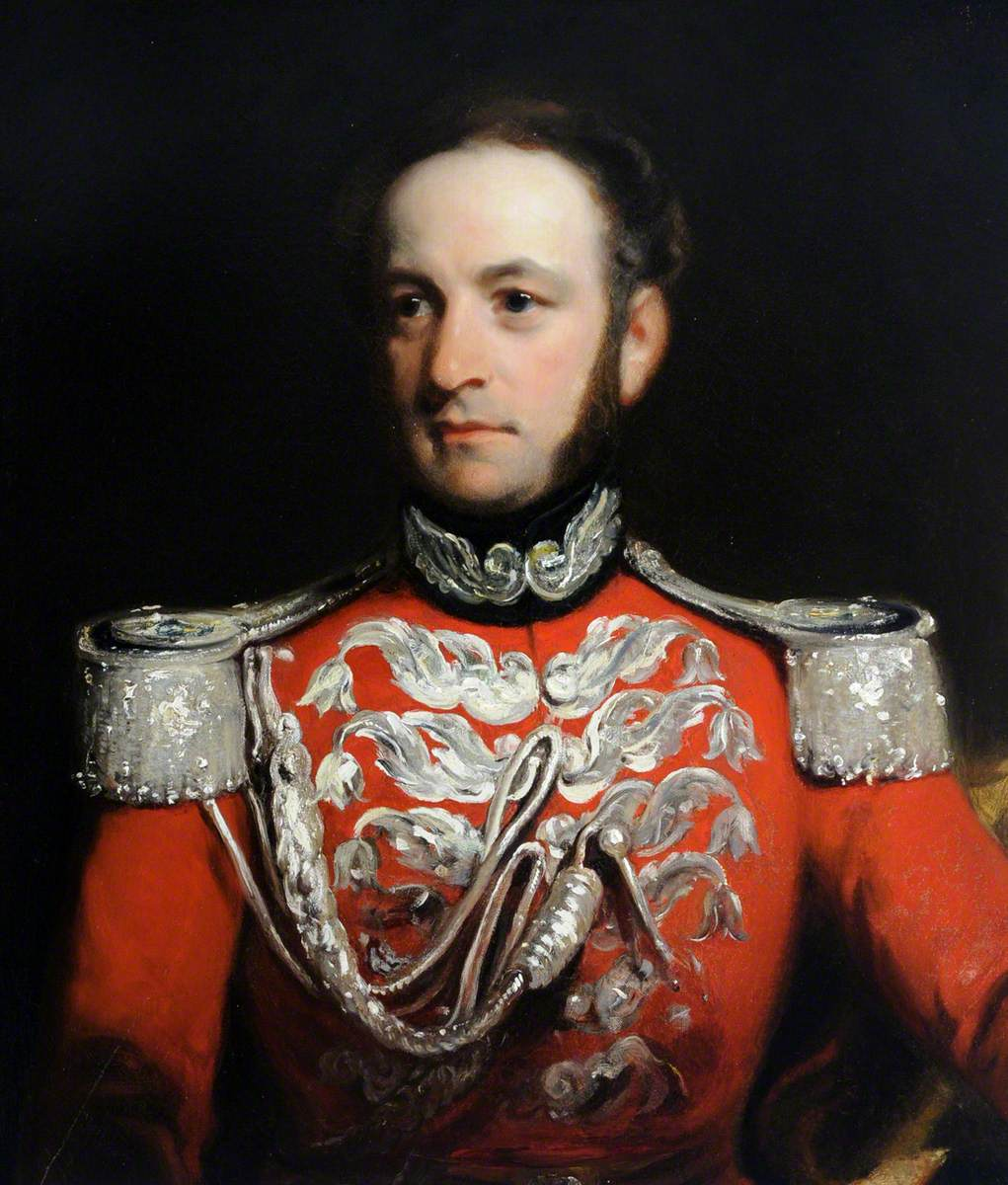
- Born: 21 October 1794; Saint Aubin, Jersey
- Died: 24 December 1875 (aged 81); Saint Aubin, Jersey
- Military career
- Allegiance: United Kingdom
- Branch: British Army
- Rank: Colonel
- Unit: 104th Regiment of Foot (New Brunswick Regiment)
- Conflicts: War of 1812
- Other work: Aide-de-camp for Jersey

Colonel Sir John Le Couteur (21 October 1794 – 24 December 1875) was a British Army officer and aide-de-camp for Jersey to William IV and Victoria. Son of Lieutenant General John Le Couteur (1761–1835), he is best known for his War of 1812 memoirs of his service as a lieutenant in the 104th Foot, published in 1993 as Merry Hearts Make Light Days.

== War of 1812 ==
In November 1811, at the age of 17, Le Couteur was promoted from Ensign in the 96th Regiment (on Jersey) to a Lieutenant in the 104th Regiment of Foot and was ordered to join his regiment in New Brunswick. During the Anglo-American War of 1812, the 104th was ordered to march 700 miles from Fredericton, in the less vulnerable region of New Brunswick, to defend Kingston in the threatened area of Upper Canada. This was necessary because the Commander-in-Chief in Canada, Sir George Prevost, found himself with only 3000 troops to defend 1100 miles of frontier. The march of the 104th, of which Le Couteur's journal provides a detailed account, lasted from 21 February to 12 April 1813. The men marched across difficult terrain in extreme winter conditions, and with temperatures dropping as low as −27 °F (−32 °C), few escaped frostbite.

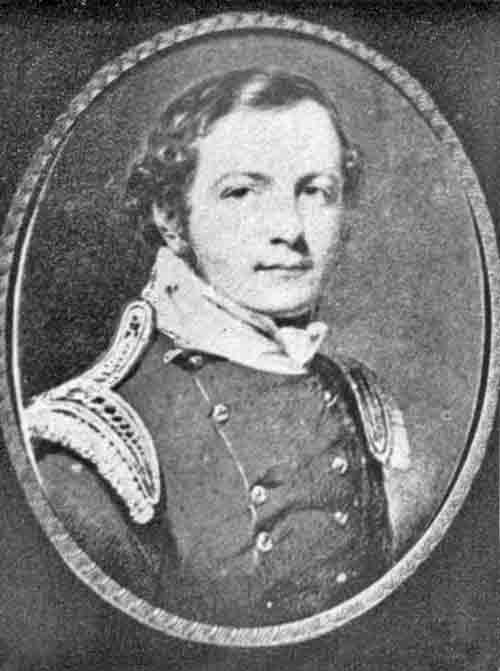
Image of John Le Couteur as a subaltern officer, c.1811.

Le Couteur later took part in the Siege of Fort Erie, the Battles of Sackett's Harbour and Lundy's Lane and thirty-three skirmishes.

In his journal, Le Couteur expresses admiration for the bravery of the First Nation allies but considers them 'very savage' and cruel to prisoners.

After the war, in 1816, Le Couteur was appointed aide-de-camp to his father, Lieutenant-General John Le Couteur, in Curaçao before returning to Canada the following year.

== Life and work in Jersey ==
When the 104th Regiment was disbanded in 1818, Le Couteur returned to Jersey as a captain and married his cousin, Harriet Janvrin. He had two sons and three daughters.

He became Colonel of the West Regiment of the Militia in 1829.

In Jersey, Le Couteur held a number of official posts: he was elected Connétable of Saint Brélade in 1826 and Jurat in 1835. He was appointed Aide-de-camp in 1831 to William IV and this position was renewed when Victoria came to the throne in 1837 (Victoria visited the island in 1846). Le Couteur held the position of Aide-de-camp until 1872 and he was knighted in the same year.

== Agricultural science ==
Le Couteur had many interests and was a competent artist. He undertook a sustained scientific study of wheat and produced several books on agriculture: On the Varieties, Properties, and Classification of Wheat (1836); On the Use of the Jersey Trench Plough (1842); On the Rise, Progress and State of Agriculture in Jersey (1852). In recognition of his enquiries, Le Couteur was elected a Fellow of the Royal Society in 1843.

== Historiography and legacy ==
Le Couteur was a prolific writer; his voluminous papers are held by the Société Jersiaise in Saint Helier. Selections were published in 1969 in Joan Steven's Victorian voices: An introduction to the papers of Sir John Le Couteur. His War of 1812 memoirs, edited by Canadian historian Donald E. Graves, were published in 1993 as Merry Hearts Make Light Days.

Le Couteur also gained renewed public attention in both Canada and Jersey when his account of the 104th Regiment's 1813 trek from Fredericton, New Brunswick to Kingston, Upper Canada was adapted into a short film, The Winter March, in 2013. The project won the Historica-Dominion Institute's War of 1812 bicentennial Heritage Minute student contest and was screened at the Toronto International Film Festival's Next Wave showcase.
