= 102nd Regiment of Foot (1781) =

Infantry regiment of the British Army

The 102nd Regiment of Foot was a regiment of the British Army between 1781 and 1785.

== History ==
The regiment was raised in 1781. The regiment fought in India during the Second Anglo-Mysore War and lost its king's colour and regimental colour on 3 May 1783 during the Siege of Bednore when the fortress fell to Mysore forces. The regiment was disbanded in 1785.
