= Battle of Porto Novo =

1781 battle

Coordinates: 11°29′31″N 79°45′58″E

- Part of the Second Anglo-Mysore War
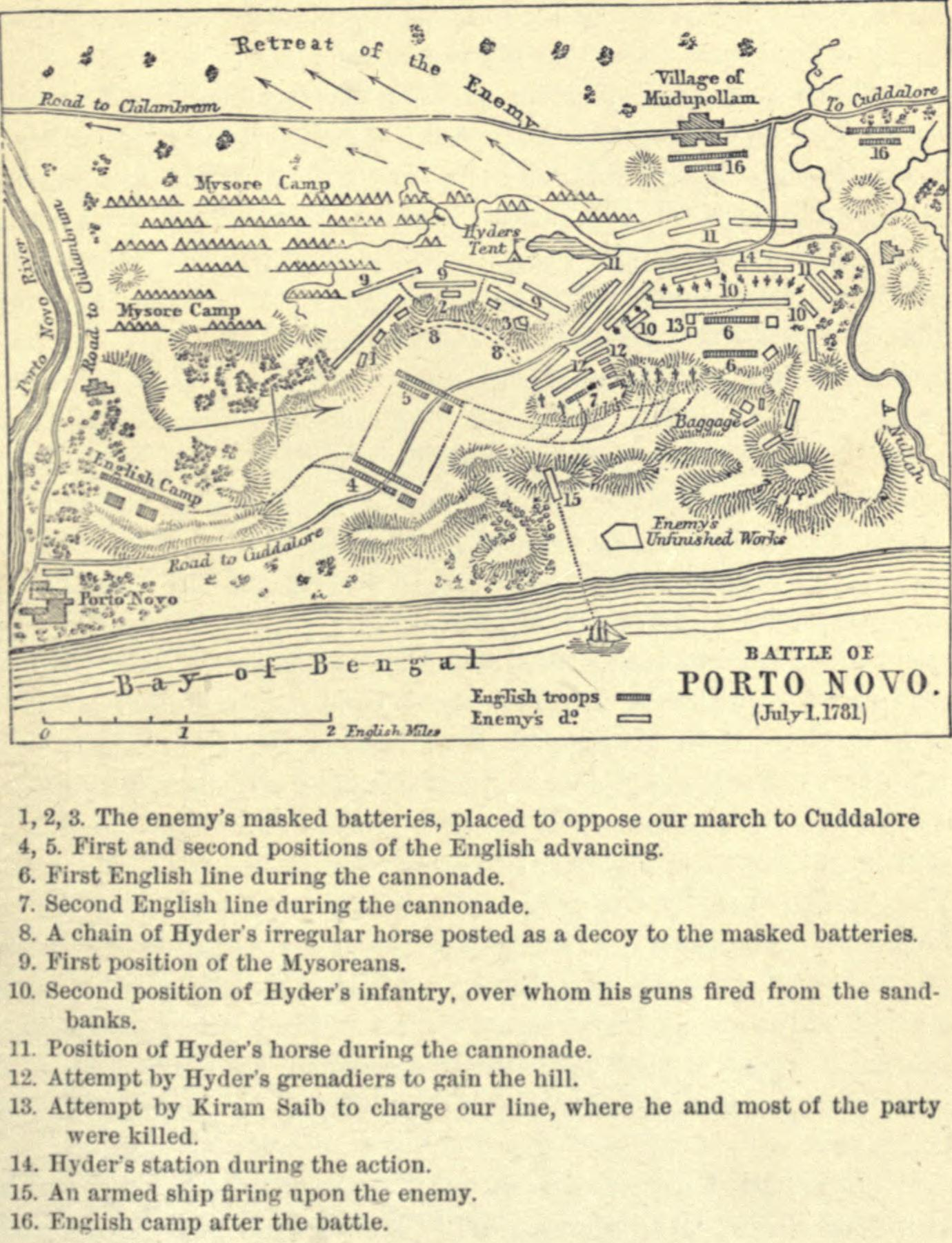
- Map of the battle
Date	1 July 1781
Location	Parangipettai, Cuddalore district
Result	British victory

Belligerents
East India Company	Mysore

Commanders and leaders
Sir Eyre Coote	Hyder Ali

Strength
~8,000	~40,000

The Battle of Porto Novo was fought on 1 July 1781 between forces of the Kingdom of Mysore and British East India Company in the place called Porto Novo (now known as Parangipettai) on the Indian subcontinent, during the Second Anglo-Mysore War. The British force, numbering more than 8,000 men under the command of Sir Eyre Coote defeated a force estimated at 40,000 under the command of Hyder Ali.

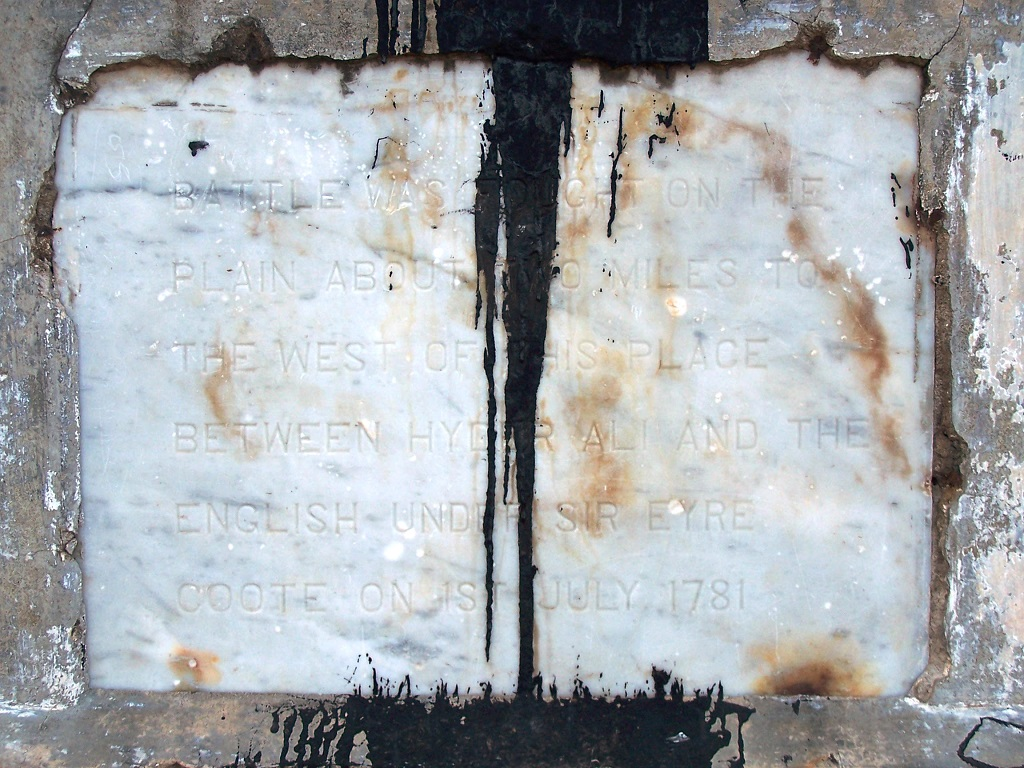
Memorial for the Battle of Porto Novo, 1781 at Porto Novo

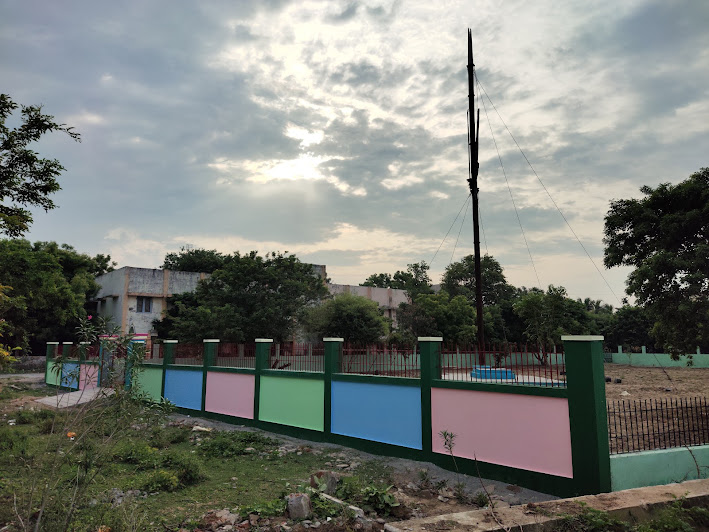
The Battle of Porto Novo Memorial Park

It is also called the Battle of Chelambram (Chidambaram) One of the most crucial battles ever fought in southern India, after the war known that Hyder Ali ordered not to take any prisoners.
