= Richard Matthews (East India Company officer) =

Soldier (??–1783)

Brigadier-General Richard Matthews (d. 1783) was a soldier who fought with the Army of the East India Company. He fought in the Second Anglo-Mysore War (1780-84).

== Bednore ==
After initial successes in seizing the forts of Rajamundroog and Mirjan (Merjee) before moving on and taking Honnavar (Onore), Matthews was ordered to advance on Bednore. Following the death of Hyder Ali, the commander of Bednore, when Hyat Sahib, the Mysore commander, surrendered to Matthews after learning that Hyder's son and successor Tipu Sultan intended to remove him from command.
