= Nagara, Karnataka =

Nagara Fort Bidanuru kote
- village
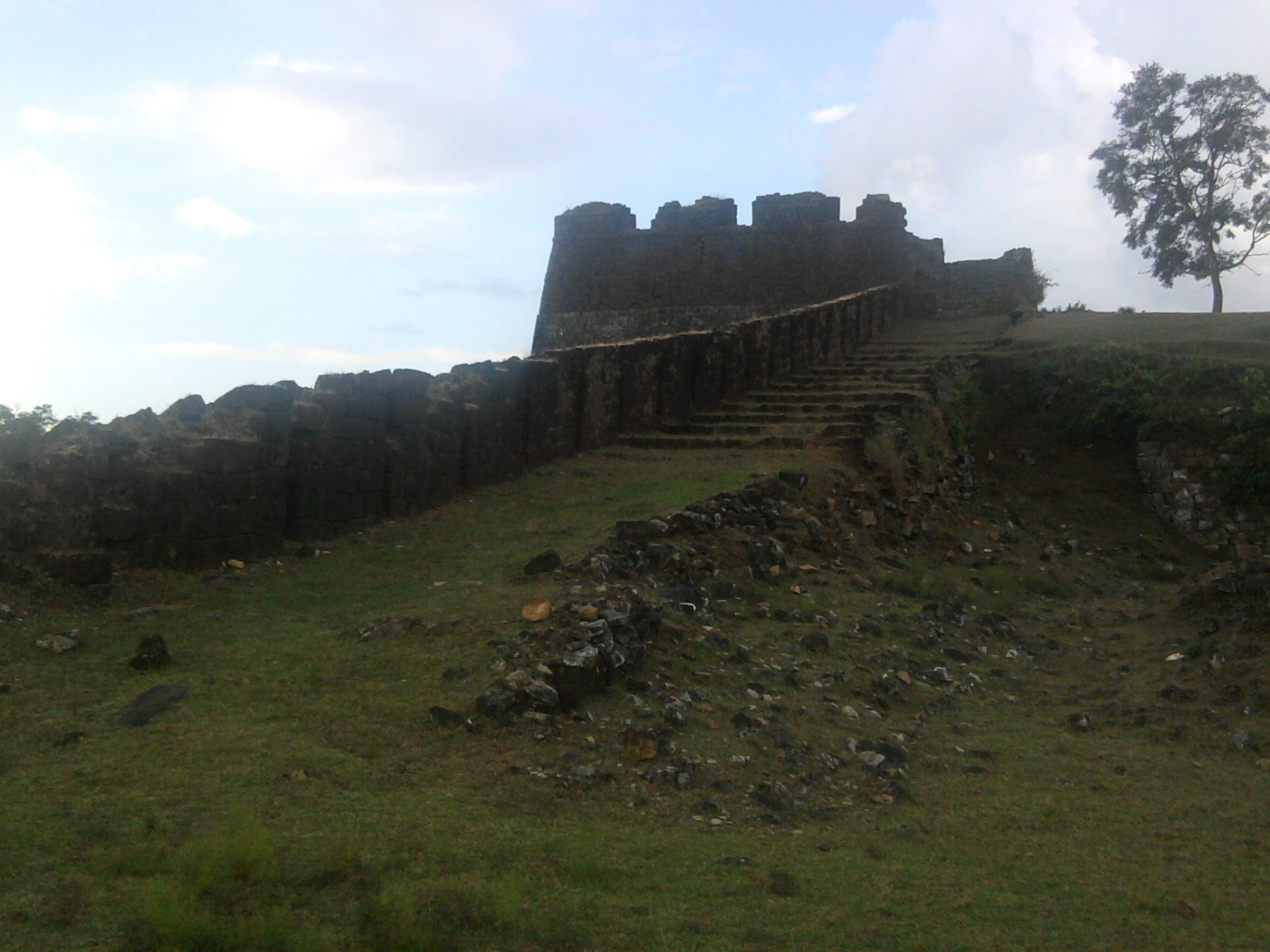
- Shivappa Nayaka Fort, Nagara

- Location in Karnataka, India Nagara Fort (India)
- Coordinates: 13.824°N 75.034°E
- Country: India
- State: Karnataka
- District: Shivamogga

Languages
  - Official: Kannada
- Time zone: UTC+5:30 (IST)
- PIN: 577 425
- Telephone code: 08185
- Website: http://nagara.in

Nagara (Kannada: [nɐɡɐrɐ]) is a historic village in the Shivamogga district of the state of Karnataka, India. It is 17 kilometres (11 mi) from Hosanagara or 84 kilometres (52 mi) from Shivamogga. This was called Bidanur (Bidanoor) (Kannada: [bid̪ɐnuːru]) or Bidnur (Bidanoor) earlier during the 16th century, this was the last capital city of Nayakas of Keladi.

In 1763, Hyder Ali, Sarvadhikari of Mysore captured this fort and called Hydernagar or Hydernagara after his name "Hyder". In 1783 it surrendered to a British detachment under General Matthews, but being shortly after invested by Mysore's Tipu Sultan, the garrison capitulated on condition of safe conduct to the coast. Tippoo violated the stipulation, put General Matthews and the principal officers to death, and imprisoned the remainder of the force.

Farmers of the region in and around the village were instrumental in sparking the Nagar revolt against the Mysore kingdom in 1830.

Nagara was resided by an independence activist by the name of Sripathy Rao Baliga (1914–2003) who continued to work for the welfare of the village in the post independence era.

Shivappa Nayaka palace, fort, Devaganga tank, Neelakenteshwara temple and Gudde Venkataramana Swamy temple are worth visiting. The fort is built on a small hill, beside a lake. The fort has a system to circulate water around it for safety.

On the hill, within the fort, there are Darbar Hall (King's Court), remains of a palace, two tanks called Akka Thangi Kola (Tanks of two sisters), and a cannon. Devaganga tank is a cluster of seven tanks for bathing. Nagara in Kannada language literally means city. The place is amidst green thick forests which are giving way to urbanisation and eventually to deforestation. The nearest Airport is Kuvempu Airport, Shivamogga which is 40 KM from Nagara . Kollur Mookambika temple is 40 kilometres (25 mi) from here. The nearest airport is Mangalore International Airport, situated 146Km from Nagara.

== See also ==
- Ikkeri
- Keladi
- Kodachadri
- Silpa Avenue Colony
