= Treaty of Mangalore =

1784 treaty which ended the Second Anglo-Mysore War

Treaty of Perpetual Peace and Friendship between the Honourable the East India Company and the Nawab Tippoo Sultan Bahadoor, on his own behalf, for the countries of Seringapatam, Hyder Nagur, etc., and all his other possessions, settled by Anthony Sadlier, George Leonard Staunton, and John Hudleston, Esquires, on behalf of the Honourable English East India Company for all their possessions and for the Carnatic Payen Ghat, by virtue of powers delegated to the Honourable the President and Select Committee of Fort St. George for that purpose, by the Honourable the Governor-General and Council appointed by the King and Parliament of Great Britain to direct and control all political affairs of the Honourable English East India Company, and by the said Nawab, agreeable to the following Atricles, which are to be strictly and invariably observed, as long as the sun and moon shall last, by both parties; that is to say, by the English Company and the three Governments of Bengal, Madras and Bombay, and the Nawab Tippoo Sultan Bahadoor.
- Type: Treaty of Peace
- Context: Second Anglo-Mysore War
- Signed: 11 March 1784
- Location: Mangalore
- Ratified: (East India Company) 20 April 1784
- Parties: (Kingdom of Mysore) Sultanate of Mysore; East India Company
- Languages: Persian and English

The Treaty of Mangalore was signed between Tipu Sultan and the British East India Company on 11 March 1784. It was signed in Mangaluru and brought an end to the Second Anglo-Mysore War.

== Background ==
Hyder Ali became dalwai Dalavayi of Mysore by force in 1761 displacing the Wodeyar Dynasty which had previously ruled the Kingdom. In 1766, war with the British broke out and Hyder's forces came close to capturing Madras, before his attacks began to falter. The war ended three years later with the Treaty of Madras in April 1769. This provided the mutual restoration of all conquests as well as mutual aid and alliance in a defensive war.

The Second Anglo-Mysore war broke out for a number reasons, primary among them being that Hyder Ali considered the British in breach of the treaty of April 1769 since they provided no aid in Mysore's defensive war with the Marathas. War with the British broke out in 1780 when Hyder led 80,000-90,000 men into the Carnatic region burning and destroying much of the countryside around the British strongholds of Vellore and Madras.

The British sent an army of about 5,000 men to lift the siege of Arcot by Hyder who retaliated with an opposing force of about 10,000 men under the command of Tipu Sultan, his son. Tipu led his force to a crushing victory over the British at Pollilur. The British lost about 4,000 men during this battle which was the worst defeat of the British East India Company to date in India. Hyder continued his siege and Tipu continued to menace the British in the Carnatic region.

Tipu won another victory against the Company in 1782 when he defeated Colonel Braithwaite at Tanjore. The entire force of about 2,000 men and about 10 field pieces were either killed or captured. By the end of 1781, the British began their counterattack. In quick succession, the British won the battles of Porto Novo, 2nd Pollilur, Sholinghur and the siege of Negapatam. In 1782, Hyder suddenly died, and Tipu became king. In 1783, the British took the town of Coimbatore and by January 1784, Tipu retook Mangalore from the British. With neither side in a position to win, the war ended in stalemate and was then concluded with the Treaty of Mangalore.

== Consequences ==
The great advantage of the treaty to Tipu was the psychological impact of the actual treaty on the British. The Commissioner for the British East India Company in Madras had to go to Mangalore, a recent reconquest of Tipu's, on the opposite coast of India, to sign the treaty. The humiliation of the Treaty (coupled with the recent loss of the Thirteen Colonies, in America) made the British determined to defeat Tipu.

The Treaty of Mangalore in Britain was seen by many as the beginning of the end of the British East India Company. As a result, stock prices in the Company dived and the British East India Company began to fail. This was of great concern to the British government since its trade represented a sixth of the British national income. It was decided to fix the problems through what is now called Pitt's India Act. This act solved the issues of corruption, and it invested powers in the Governor-General to act in the interest of King and Country to stop an issue like the Treaty of Mangalore from happening again.

== Text ==
TREATY Honourable the English East India Company and the Nawab Tipu Sultan Bahadur, on his own behalf; for the countries of Seringapatam Hyder Nagur etc. and all his other possessions settled by Anthony Sadlier, George Leonard Staunton and John Hudleston Esquires, on behalf of the Honourable English East India Company for all their possessions, and for the Carnatic Payen Ghaut, by virtue of powers delegated to the Right Honourable the President & Select Committee of Fort St. George for that purpose, by the Honourable the Governor General & Council appointed by the King & Parliament of Great Britain, to direct & controul all political affairs of the Honourable English East India Company in India, by the said Nawab agreeably to the following Articles, which are to be strictly and invariably, observed as long as the Sun & Moon shall last, by both parties, that is to say, by the English Company & the three Governments of Bengal, Madras, and Bombay, and the Nawab Tipu Sultan Bahadur.

Article 1st.—Peace & friendship shall immediately take place between the said Company the Nawab Tipu Sultan Bahadur & their friends, and allies, particularly including therein the Rajahs of Tanjore & Travencore, who are friends & allies to the English and the Carnatic Payen Ghaut, also Tipu Sultan's friends & allies, the Biby of Cannanore, and the Rajahs or Zamindars of the Malabar coast, are included in this treaty, the English will not directly or indirectly assist the enemies of the Nawab Tipu Sultan Bahadur nor make war upon his friends or allies, and the Nawab Tipu Sultan Bahadur will not directly or indirectly assist the enemies, nor make war upon the friends or allies of the English.

Article 2nd.—Immediately after signing and sealing the Treaty by the Nawab Tipu Sultan Bahadur and the three English Commissioners, the said Nawab shall send orders for the complete evacuation of the Carnatic, and the restoration of all the forts and places in it, now possessed by his troops, the forts of Amboorgur and Satgur excepted; & such evacuation and restoration shall actually & effectually be made in the space of thirty days from the day of signing the treaty, and the said Nawab shall also immediately after signing the treaty send orders for the release of all the persons who were taken & made prisoners in the late war, and now alive, whether European or Native, and for their being safely conducted to & delivered at such English Forts or Settlements, as shall be nearest to the places where they now are, so that the said release & delivery of the prisoners shall actually & effectually be made in thirty days from the day of signing the Treaty; the Nawab will cause them to be supplied with provisions and conveyances for the journey, the expense of which shall be made good to him by the company. The Commissioners will send an officer or officers to accompany the prisoners to the different places, where they are to be delivered, in particular Abdul Wahab Cawn, taken at Chittoor, and his family shall be immediately released, & if willing to return to the Carnatic shall be allowed to do so. If any person or persons belonging to the said Nawab, and taken by the Company in the late war, be now alive, & in prison in Bencoolen, or other territories of the Company such person or persons shall be immediately released, and if willing to return shall be sent without delay to the nearest fort or settlement in the Mysore country. Baswapa, late Amuldar of Palicacherry, shall be released & at liberty to depart.

Article 3rd.—Immediately after signing and sealing the treaty the English Commissioners shall give written orders for the delivery of Onore, Carwar and Sadasewgude, and forts or places adjoining thereto, and send a ship or ships to bring away the Garrisons. The Nawab Tipu Sultan Bahadur will cause the troops in those places to be supplied with provisions and any other necessary assistance for their voyage to Bombay (they paying for the same). The Commissioners will likewise give at the same time written orders for the immediate delivery of the forts & districts of Caroor, Avaracourchy, & Daraporam; and immediately after the release and delivery of the prisoners, as before mentioned, the fort and district of Dindigul shall be evacuated & restored to the Nawab Tipu Sultan Bahadur, and none of the troops of the Company shall afterwards remain in the country of the Nawab Tipu Sultan Bahadur.

Article 4th.—As soon as all the prisoners are released and delivered, the fort & district of Cananore shall be evacuated and restored to Ali Rajah Biby, the Queen of that country, in the presence of any one person, without troops, whom the Nabob Tipu Sultan Bahadur may appoint for that purpose, and at the same time that the orders are given, for the evacuation and delivery of the forts of Cananore and Dindigull, the said Nabob shall give written orders for the evacuation, and deliver of Amboorgur and Satgur to the English, and in the meantime none of the troops of the said Nawab shall be left in any part of the Carnatic, except in the two forts above mentioned.

Article 5th.—After the conclusion of this treaty the Nawab Tipu Sultan Bahadur will make no claim whatever in future on the Carnatic.

Article 6th.—All persons whatsoever, who have been taken & carried away from the Carnatic Payen Ghaut (which includes Tanjore) by the late Nawab Hyder Ali Cawn Bahadur, who is in heaven, or by the Nawab Tipu Sultan Bahadur, or otherwise belonging to the Carnatic, and now in the Nawab Tipu Sultan Bahadur's dominions, and willing to return, shall be immediately allowed to return with their families & children, or as soon as may be convenient to themselves, and all persons belonging to the Vencatagerry Rajah, who were taken prisoners in returning from the fort of Vellour, to which place they had been sent with provisions, shall also be released & permitted immediately to return. Lists of the principal persons belonging to the Nawab Mahomed Ali Cawn Bahadur and to the Rajah of Vencatagherry shall be delivered to the Nawab Tipu Sultan's ministers, and the Nawab will cause the contents of this article to be publicly notified throughout his country.

Article 7th.—This being the happy period of general peace and reconciliation, the Nawab Tipu Sultan Bahadur as a testimony and proof of his friendship to the English, agrees that the Rajahs or Zamindars on this coast, who have favoured the English in the late war shall not be molested on that account.

Article 8th.—The Nawab Tippoo Sultan Bahadur hereby renews & confirms all the commercial privileges & immunities given to the English by the late Nawab Hyder Ali Cawn Bahadur, who is in heaven, and particularly stipulated & specified in the treaty between the company, and the said Nawab concluded 8 August 1770.

Article 9th.—The Nawab Tipu Sultan Bahadur shall restore the factory and privileges possessed by the English at Callicut until the year 1779 (or 1193 Heggra) and shall restore Mount Dilly & its district, belonging to the settlement of Tellicherry and possessed by the English, till taken by Sadar Cawn, at the commencement of the late war.

Article 10th.—This treaty shall be signed and sealed by the English Commissioners and a copy of it shall afterwards be signed & sealed by the President and Select Committee of Fort St. George, and returned to the Nawab Tipu Sultan Bahadur, in one month, or sooner, if possible, and the same shall be acknowledged under the hands & seals of the Governor General & Council of Bengal, & the Governor & Select Committee of Bombay, as binding upon all the Governments in India, and copies of the treaty, so acknowledged, shall be sent to the said Nabob in three months, or sooner, if possible.

In testimony whereof, the said contracting parties have signed, sealed, and interchangeably delivered two instruments of the same tenor and date, to wit, the said three Commissioners on behalf of the Honourable English East India Company, and the Carnatic Payen Ghaut, and the said Nawab Tipu Sultan Bahadur on his own behalf, and the dominions of Seringapatam and Hyder Nagur & ca. Thus executed at Mangalore (otherwise called Codial Bunder) this 11th day of March & year 1784, of the Christian Era & 16th day of the Moon Rabillasany in the year of the Heggra 1198.

TIPU SULTAN'S Signature.

(A True Copy.)

W. C. JACKSON, Secretary to the Embassy.

Signed:

SANTHONY SADLIER.

GEORGE LEONARD STAUNTON.

JOHN HUDLESTON.
