= Fathul Mujahidin =

Army rules

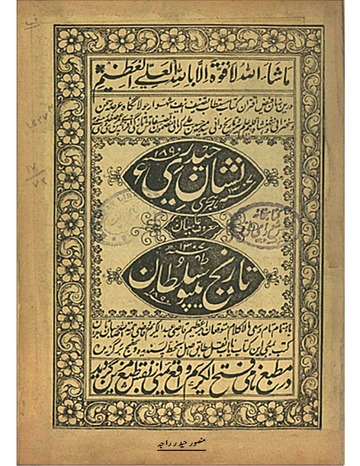
1890 reproduction of the cover page. Originally written in 1783

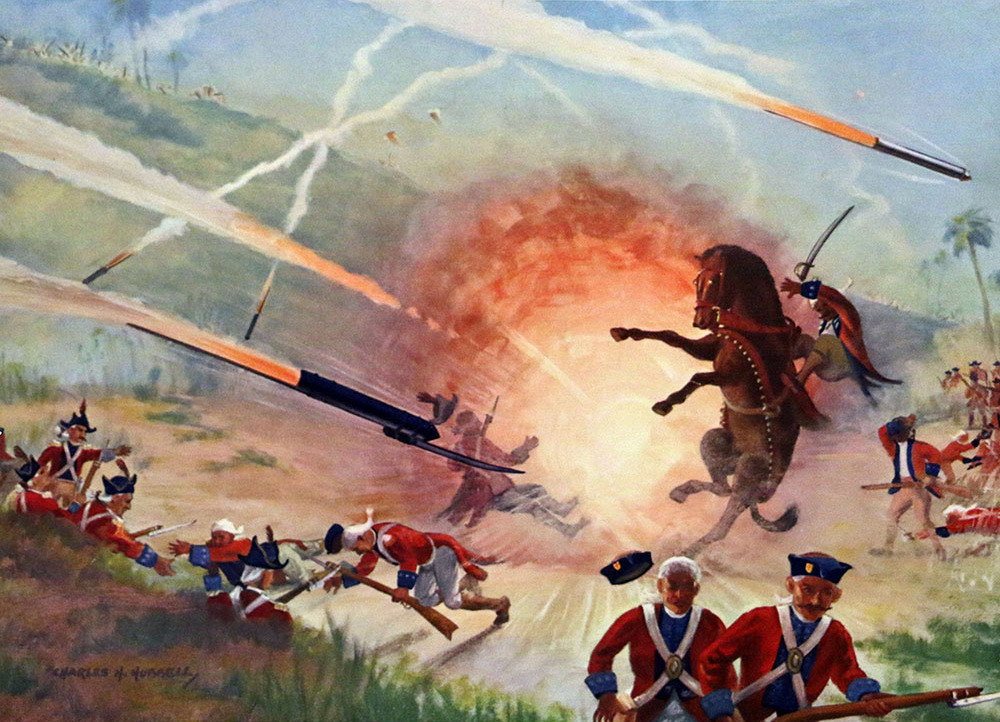
Mysorean rockets being used by Mysore forces against British troops at the Battle of Pollilur

Fathul Mujahidin (Victory of the Mujahids), was written in 1783 by Zainul Abedin Shustari at the instruction of Tipu Sultan, is a work on the rules and regulations for the army describing the duties of a soldier engaged in Jihad (Holy War). Mysore started to equip their army with rockets in the 1750s and during the Second Anglo–Mysore War (1780–1784) Tipu and his father Haider Ali used this technology against British troops. Tipu Sultan used rockets in battle against the British in the 1792 Siege of Srirangapatna, a battle at the end of the Third Anglo-Mysore War.

Tipu distributed copies of his military manual to all of his officers. In the manual he defined 200 men to handle rockets within each of the Mysore cushoons, with 16 to 24 cushoons of infantry. The personnel handling the rockets were trained to define the launch angle to properly affect the curve at which the rocket would land. Tipu also defined in the manual a multiple rocket launcher (much like a musical organ) that would launch up to 10 rockets. Some of the rockets had blades in the front of the bamboo guiding rods, while others were designed as incendiary rockets.

Although not the first use of rockets by Mysore, the 1792 Siege of Srirangapatna reportedly began with showers of as many as 2,000 rockets fired simultaneously.

According to Stephen Oliver Fought and John F. Guilmartin, Jr. in Encyclopædia Britannica (2008):

Hyder Ali, prince of Mysore, developed war rockets with an important change: the use of metal cylinders to contain the combustion powder. Although the hammered soft iron he used was crude, the bursting strength of the container of black powder was much higher than the earlier paper construction. Thus a greater internal pressure was possible, with a resultant greater thrust of the propulsive jet. The rocket body was lashed with leather thongs to a long bamboo stick. Range was perhaps up to three-quarters of a mile (more than a kilometre). Although individually these rockets were not accurate, dispersion error became less important when large numbers were fired rapidly in mass attacks. They were particularly effective against cavalry and were hurled into the air, after lighting, or skimmed along the hard dry ground. Hyder Ali's son, Tippu Sultan, continued to develop and expand the use of rocket weapons, reportedly increasing the number of rocket troops from 1,200 to a corps of 5,000. In battles at Seringapatam in 1792 and 1799 these rockets were used against the British.

== See also ==
- Congreve rocket
- Hyder Ali
- Tipu Sultan
- Mughal weapons
