= William Baillie (East India Company officer) =

Lieutenant-Colonel William Baillie (died 1782) was a British lieutenant-colonel in the East India Company's service. He was captured by Hyder Ali in 1780 at the Battle of Pollilur, and died in captivity in Seringapatam.

Records in the India Office show that he entered the army of the East India Company on 18 October 1759 as a lieutenant in the infantry at Madras, and that the dates of his subsequent commissions were as follows: brevet-captain 5 September 1763, substantive captain 2 April 1764, major 12 April 1772, lieutenant-colonel 29 December 1775.

The historian Wilks identifies him with the Captain Baillie who did good service as commandant of one of the three 'English' battalions in the pay of the company, employed under Colonel Joseph Smith, in the operations against Hyder Ali in 1767–8 (Wilks, Hist. Sketches, vol. i. and index to work). He was in command at Pondicherry during the destruction of the French works there in 1779 (Vibart, vol. i.), and in 1780 was at the head of a detached force, consisting of two companies of European infantry, two batteries of artillery, and five battalions of native infantry, in the Northern Circars. When Hyder Ali, with an army of 100,000 fighting men, swooped down on the Carnatic by way of the Changama Pass in July of that year, Baillie was ordered to unite his force with the army collecting near Madras under command of Lord Macleod, who was immediately afterwards succeeded by Sir Hector Munro. Moving down with the gigantic camp-following then customary, and, as some writers assert, with many needless delays, Baillie drew near to Madras, defeating a division of the enemy under Hyder's son Tipu Sultan, which attacked him on the march near the village of Perambaukum.

Thence he sent on word to Munro, who was encamped at Conjeveram, fourteen miles distant, that his losses prevented his further movement. Munro appears to have feared having his stores exposed at Conjeveram, and, instead of bringing the help which Baillie expected, merely sent a small reinforcement of Highlanders and sepoys under Colonel Fletcher. Indeed, a want of judgment and energy seems to have pervaded the measures of both commanders, the result being that Baillie, moving forward from Pollilur in the direction of Conjeveram, on the morning of 10 September 1780, found himself assailed by Hyder Ali's entire host. In the engagement which ensued, the blowing-up of two tumbrils within the oblong into which Baillie had formed his troops, followed by a general stampede of camp-followers through his ranks, produced irretrievable confusion. Despite the brave efforts of their officers, the sepoys, panic-stricken, could not be rallied; but the Europeans, to the number of five hundred, got together in square under Colonel Baillie, who was on foot, and, taking post on a rising bank of sand, fought with a stubborn determination never surpassed. Again and again they withstood the fierce charges of fresh bodies of Hyder's horse, supported by masses of infantry in the intervals, until all the officers lay killed or wounded, and but sixteen soldiers out of the five hundred of all ranks in the square remained unhurt. The survivors, including such of the wounded as were thought worth removal, were swept from the field as prisoners, and carried off to Seringapatam. Among the number grievously wounded was Colonel Baillie, whose personal courage in the fight and in the subsequent captivity was admitted alike by friends and foes.

In dungeons at Seringapatam, and most of the time in chains, the prisoners remained until 1784, when the survivors were returned to Madras. A few among them, like Captain David Baird, 73rd (71st) Highlanders, afterwards General Sir Baird, witnessed the day of retribution, long deferred, when the fortress fell to British arms on 4 May 1799; but Colonel Baillie was not of the number, death having ended his sufferings in captivity on 13 November 1782 (Hook's Life of Baird, vol. i.).

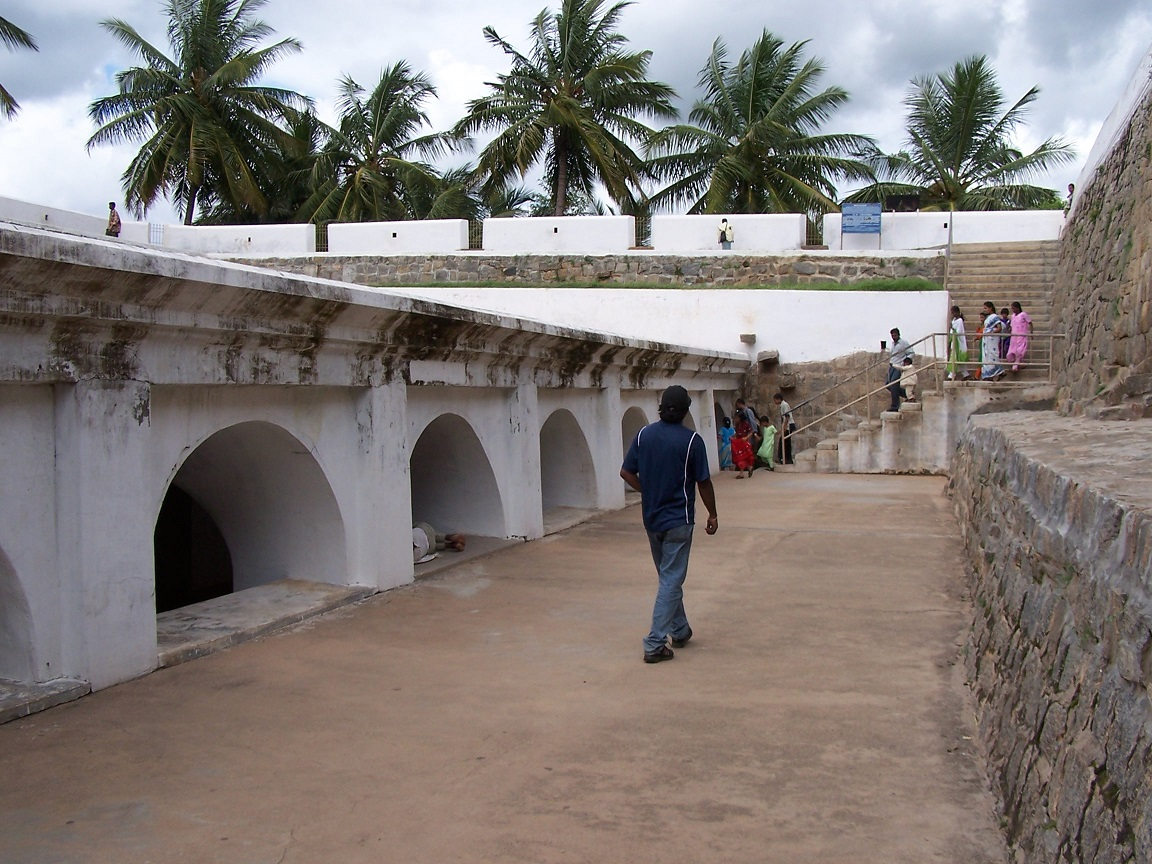
Baillie Dungeon, Seringapatam (2004)

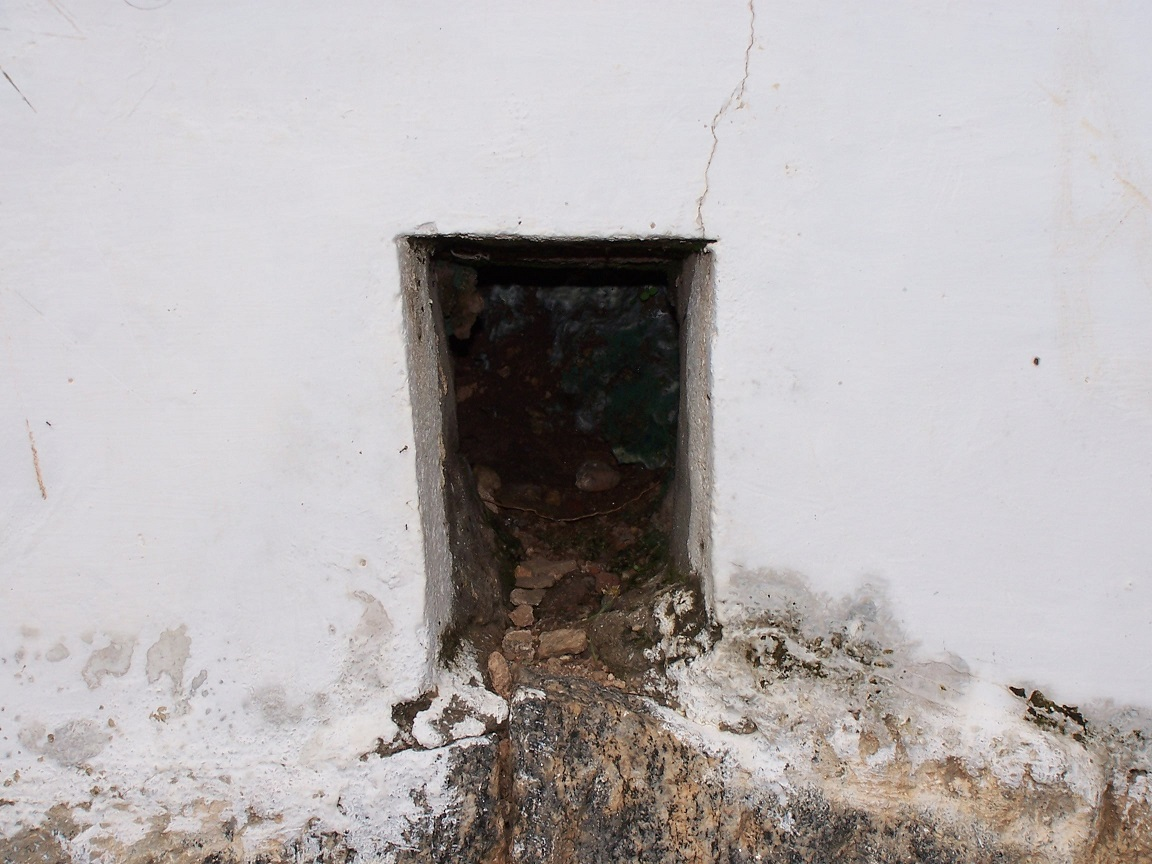
Narrow Passage to Colonel Baillie's Dungeon, Seringapatam (2004)
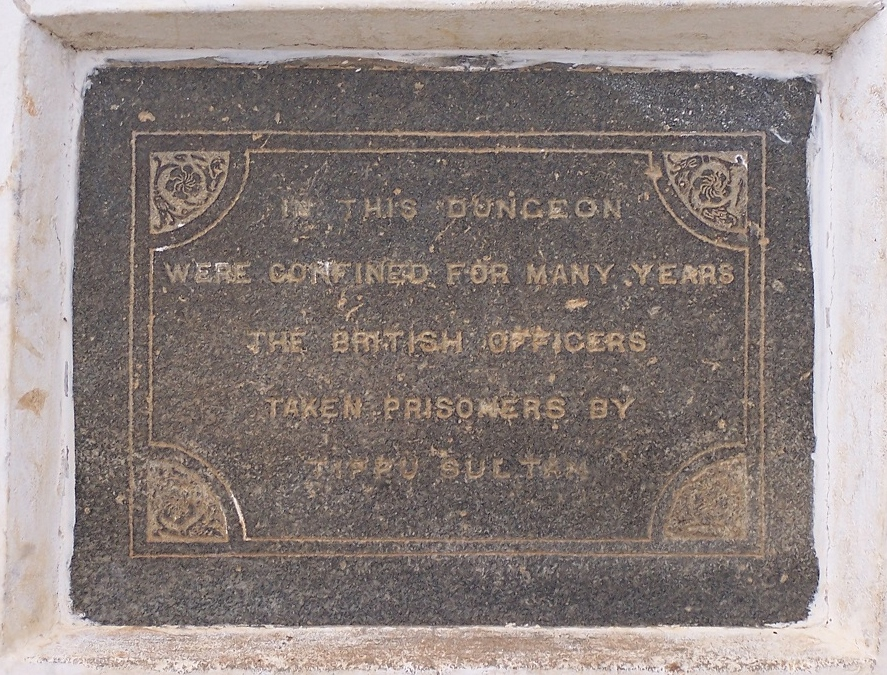
Memorial Plaque at Baillie Dungeon, Seringapatam

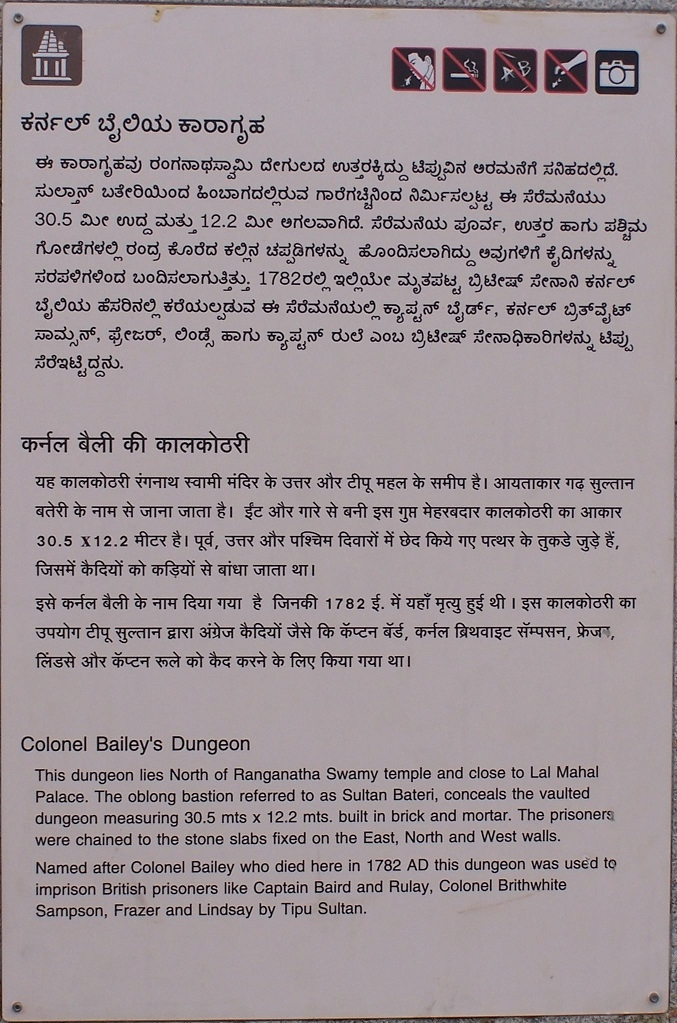
Signboard at Baillie Dungeon, Seringapatam

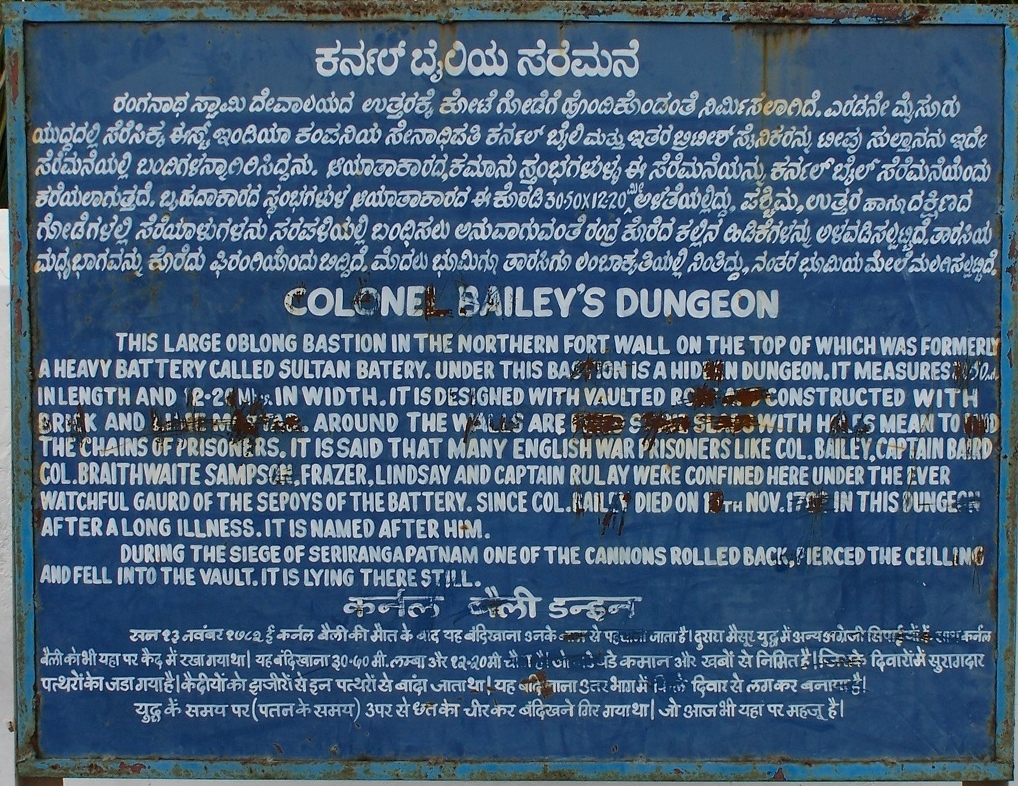
Old Signboard at Baillie Dungeon, Seringapatam

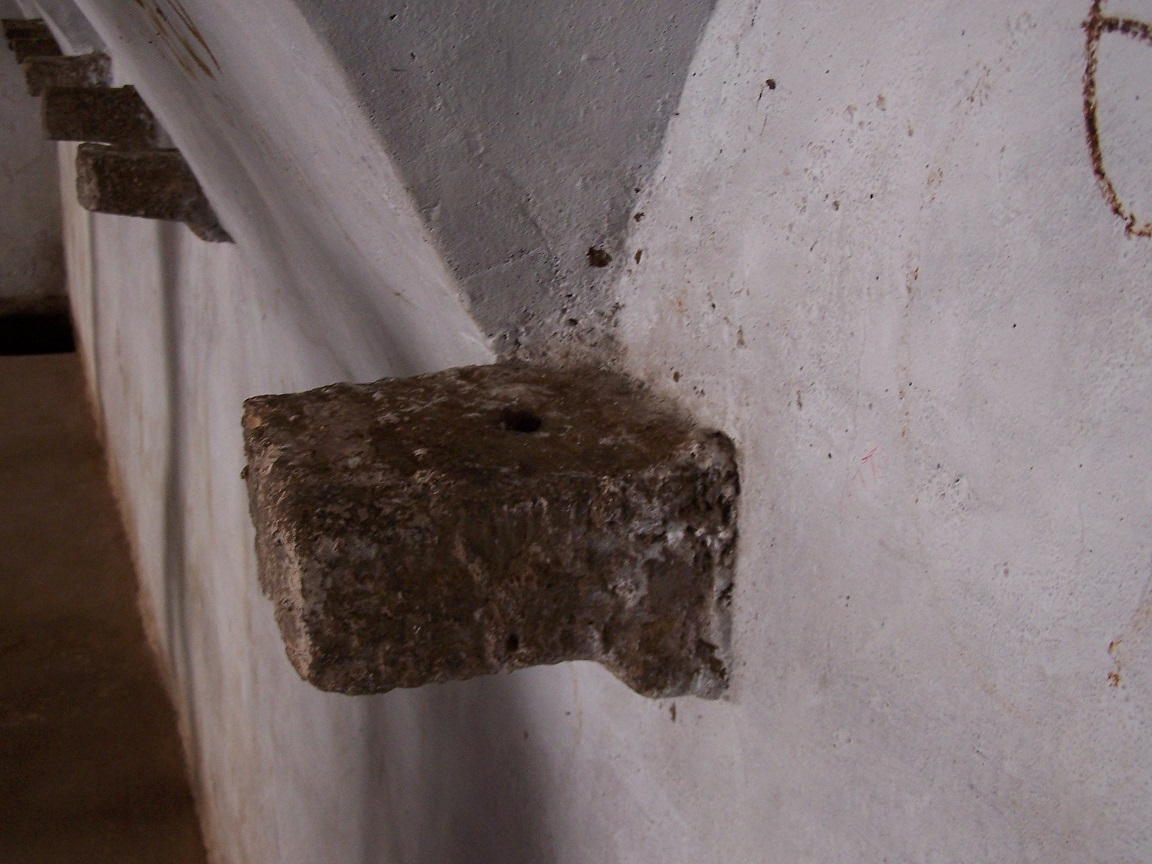
Stones to which prisoners were tied to, Baillie Dungeon, Seringapatam

Thirty-five years after Col Baillie's death, and 17 years after the fall of Tippu Sultan, Lt Col John Baillie who was his nephew, and served as the British Resident in the Court of the Nawab of Oudh, Lucknow, commissioned a memorial for Col. Baillie. It is located next to the Gumbaz, where Tippu Sultan is buried. It is an austere, but poignant and pretty structure.

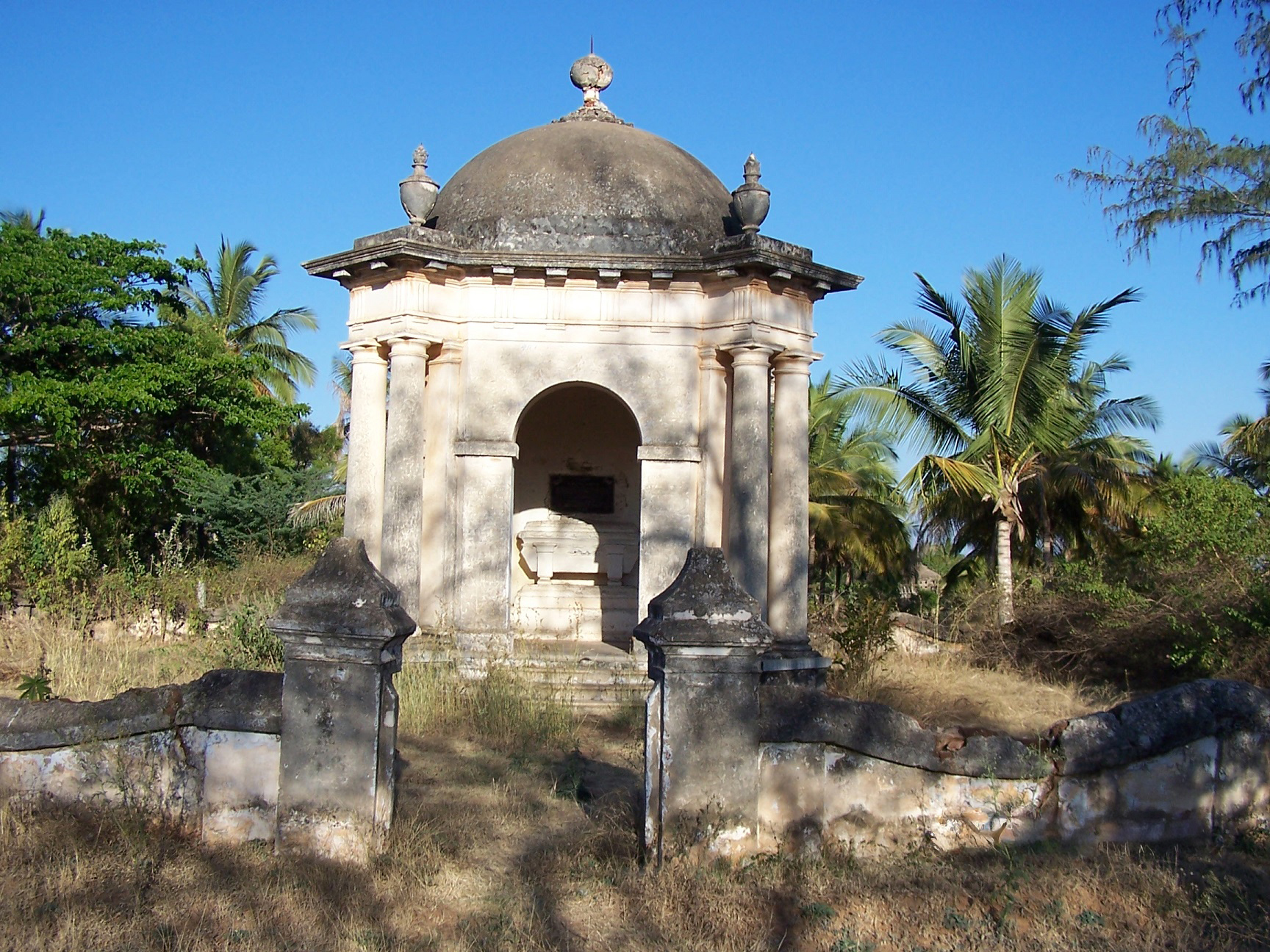
William Baillie Memorial, Seringapatam

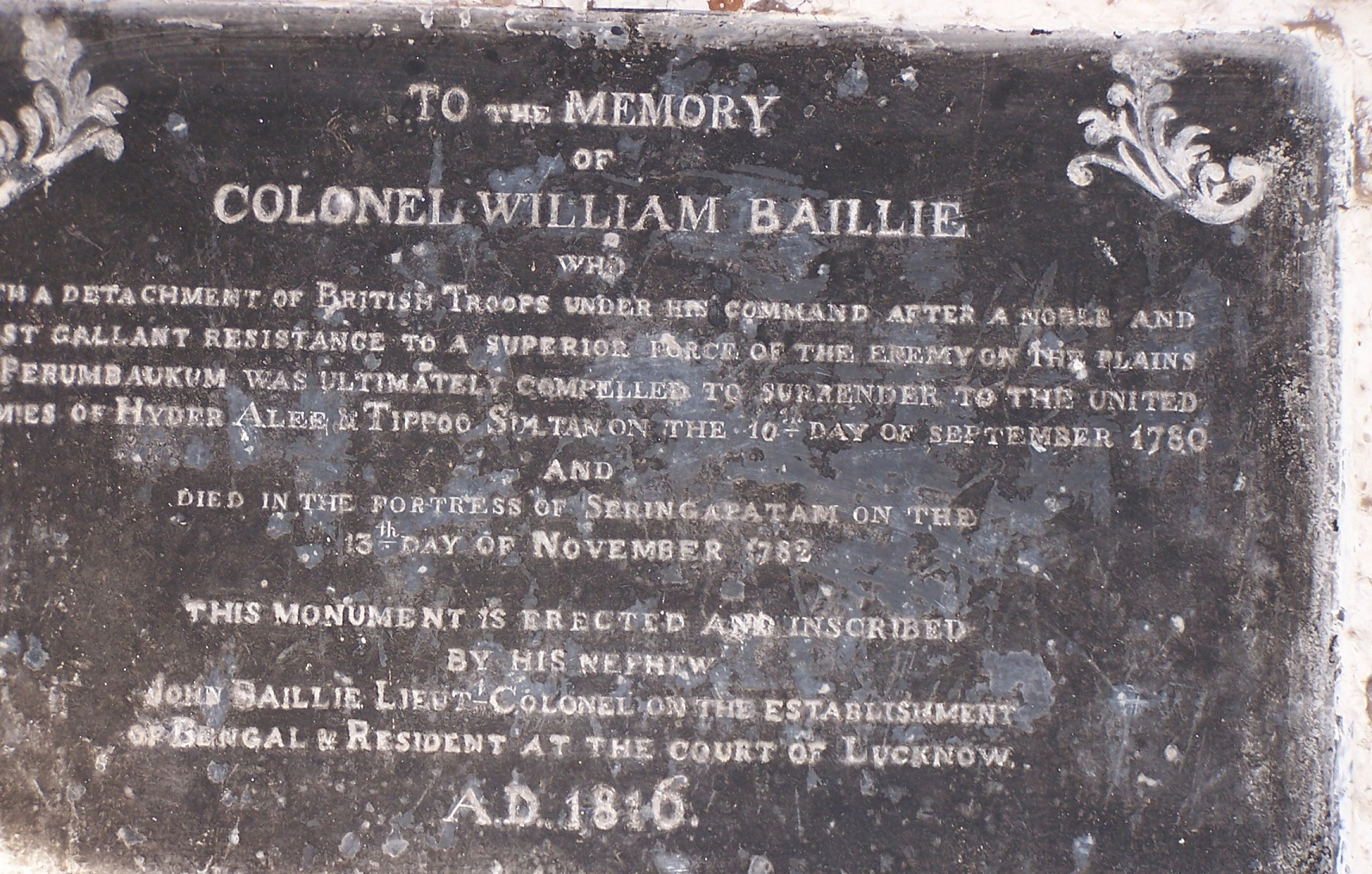
Plaque of the William Baillie Memorial, Seringapatam
