= Mysorean rockets =

Early modern Indian artillery weapon

Mysorean rocket
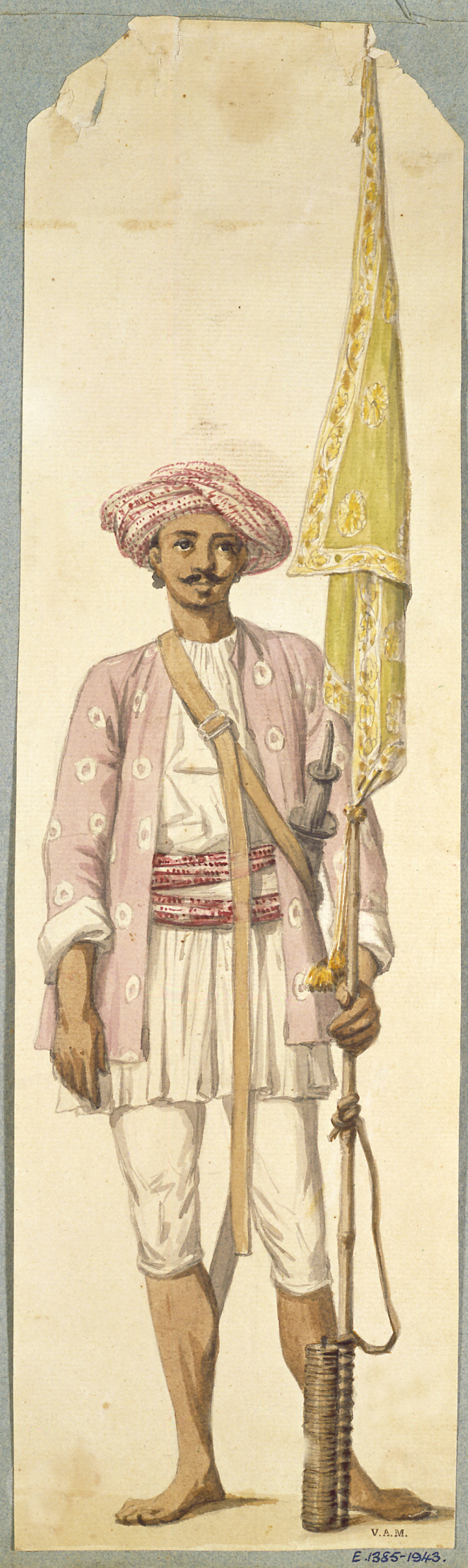
- A Mysorean soldier, using his rocket as a flagstaff (Robert Home, 1793/4).
- Type: Rocket
- Place of origin: Kingdom of Mysore

Service history
- Used by: King Hyder Ali and King Tipu Sultan
- Wars: Anglo-Mysore wars

Specifications
- Length: 200 mm (7.9 in)
- length: 1,000 mm (39 in)
- Diameter: 38–76 mm (1.5–3.0 in)
- Crew: 1
- Propellant: Black powder

Mysorean rockets were iron-cased rockets that were successfully deployed for military use. They were the first successful iron-cased rockets, developed in the late 18th century in the Kingdom of Mysore (part of present-day India) under the rule of King Hyder Ali. The Mysorean army, under King Hyder Ali and his son King Tipu Sultan, used the rockets effectively against the British East India Company during the 1780s and 1790s. Their conflicts with the company exposed the British to this technology further, which was then used to advance European rocketry with the development of the Congreve rocket in 1805.

== Technology and deployment ==
There was a regular rocket corps in the Mysore Army, beginning with about 1,200 men in King Hyder Ali's time. During the Second Anglo-Mysore War, Colonel William Baillie's ammunition stores are thought to have been detonated by a stray rocket at the Battle of Pollilur in 1780, which contributed to British defeat in the battle. At Pollilur, rockets restricted East India Company vanguard movement, skimming along the surface, lacerating troops, and in one specific instance, shattered an Ensign's leg. With rocket bombardment and harassment, East India Company forces were caught in a double envelopment movement by Mysore cavalry, encircled and routed.

King Hyder Ali and his son King Tipu Sultan deployed them against the larger British East India Company forces during the Anglo-Mysore Wars. The British took an interest in the technology and developed it further during the 19th century. Due to the use of iron tubes for holding the propellant, higher thrust and longer range for the missile (up to 2 km (1.2 mi) range) could be achieved. Rockets also existed in Europe, but they were not iron-cased and their range was far less than their Indian counterparts. These hammered soft iron rockets were crude, but the bursting strength of the container of black powder was much higher than the earlier paper construction, and a greater internal pressure was possible. These rockets were used with considerable effect against the British East India Company in battles at Srirangapatam in 1792 and 1799.

By the order of King Tipu Sultan, his general Mir Zain-ul-'Abidin Shushtari compiled a military manual called Fathul Mujahidin in which 200 rocket men were assigned to each Mysorean cushoon (brigade). Mysore had 16 to 24 cushoons of infantry. The rocket men were trained to launch their rockets at an angle calculated from the diameter of the cylinder and the distance to the target. In addition, wheeled rocket launchers were used in war that were capable of launching five to ten rockets almost simultaneously.

Rockets could be of various sizes but usually consisted of a tube of soft hammered iron about 8 inches (20 cm) long and 1.5 to 3 inches (3.8 to 7.6 centimetres) in diameter, closed at one end and strapped to a shaft of bamboo about 4 ft (1 m) long. The iron tube acted as a combustion chamber and contained well-packed black powder propellant. A rocket carrying about one pound (450 g) of powder could travel almost 1,000 yards (910 m). In contrast, rockets in Europe could not take large chamber pressures, not being iron cased, and were consequently not capable of reaching such distances.

The entire road alongside Jumma Masjid near City Market and Taramandalpet, Bangalore was the hub of King Tipu's rocket project where he had set up a laboratory.

== Use in Mysorean conflicts ==
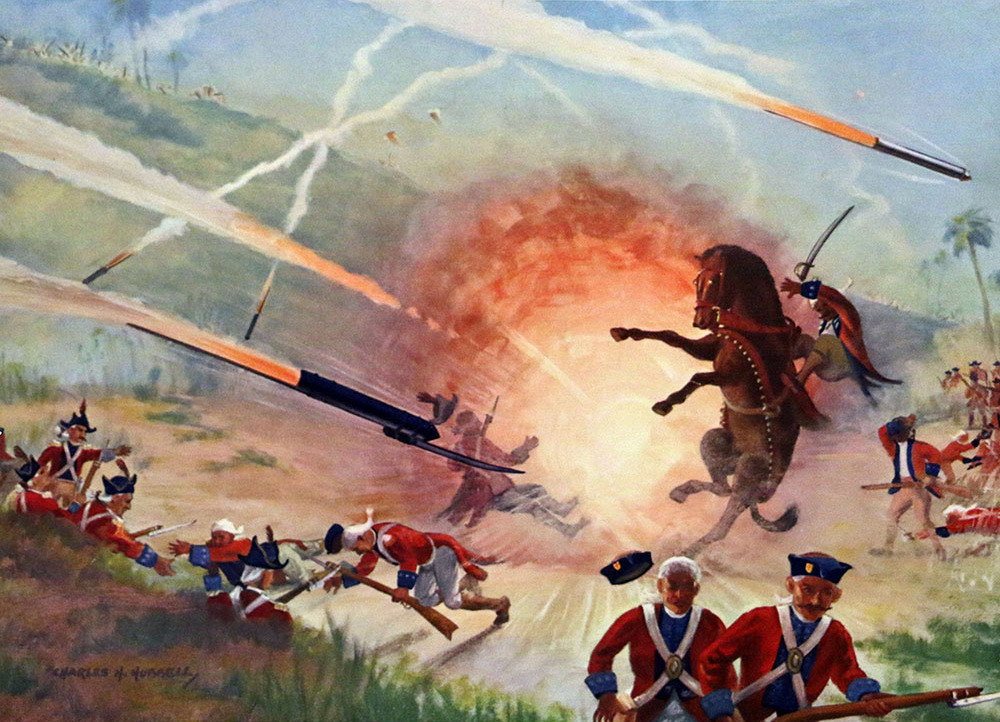
A painting showing the British forces confronted with Mysorean rockets

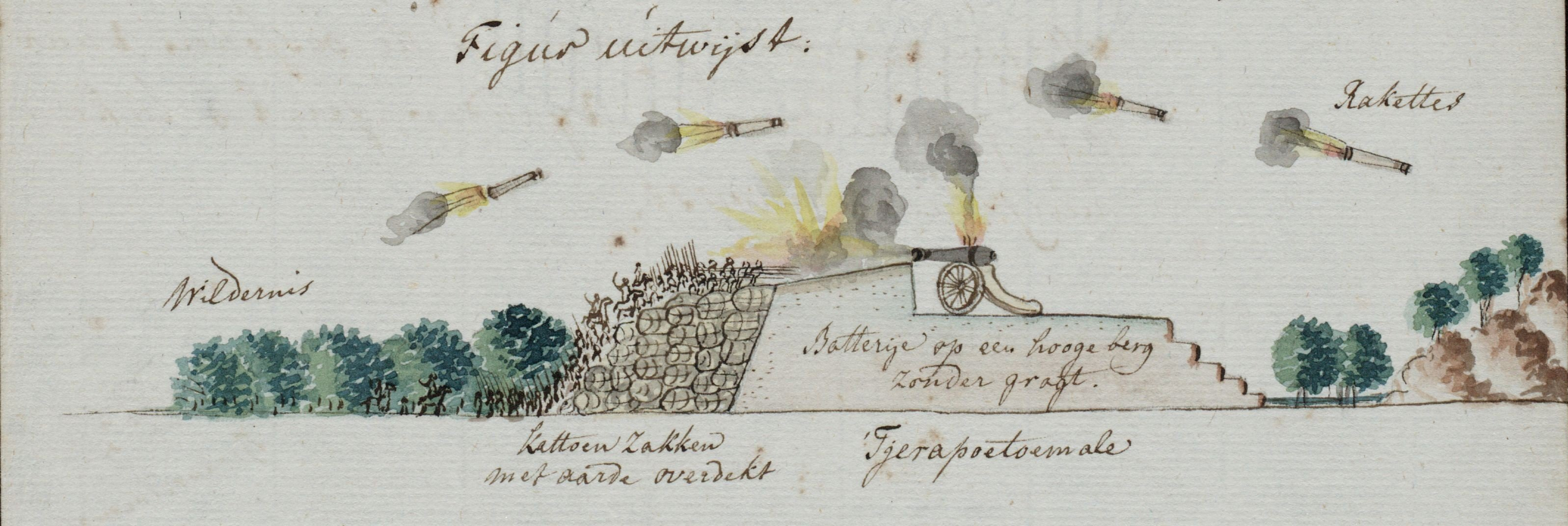
Use of rockets in an assault by Mysorean troops on Travancore Line fortification (29 December 1789)

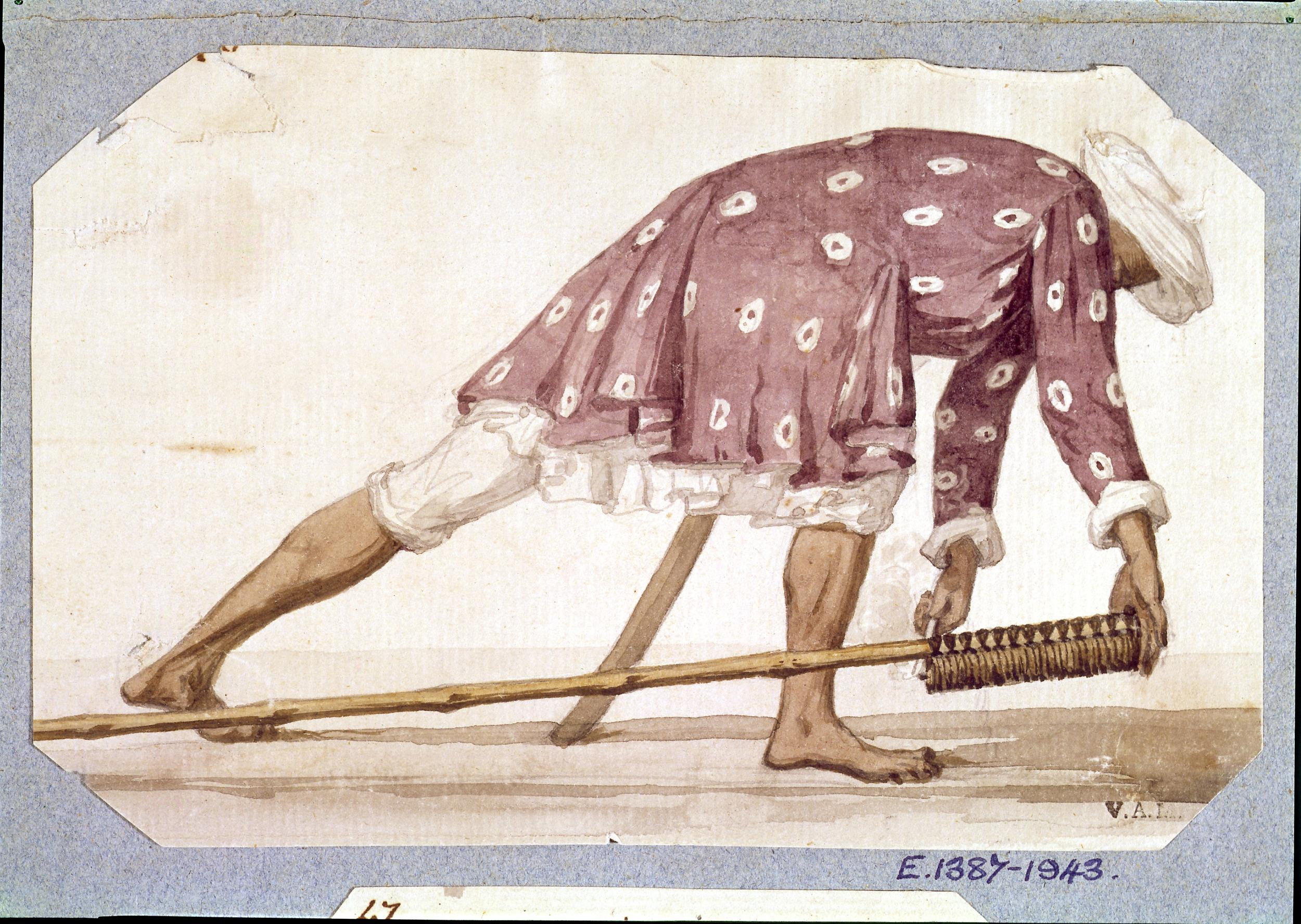
Rocket being lit by a Mysorean soldier (Illustration by Robert Home)

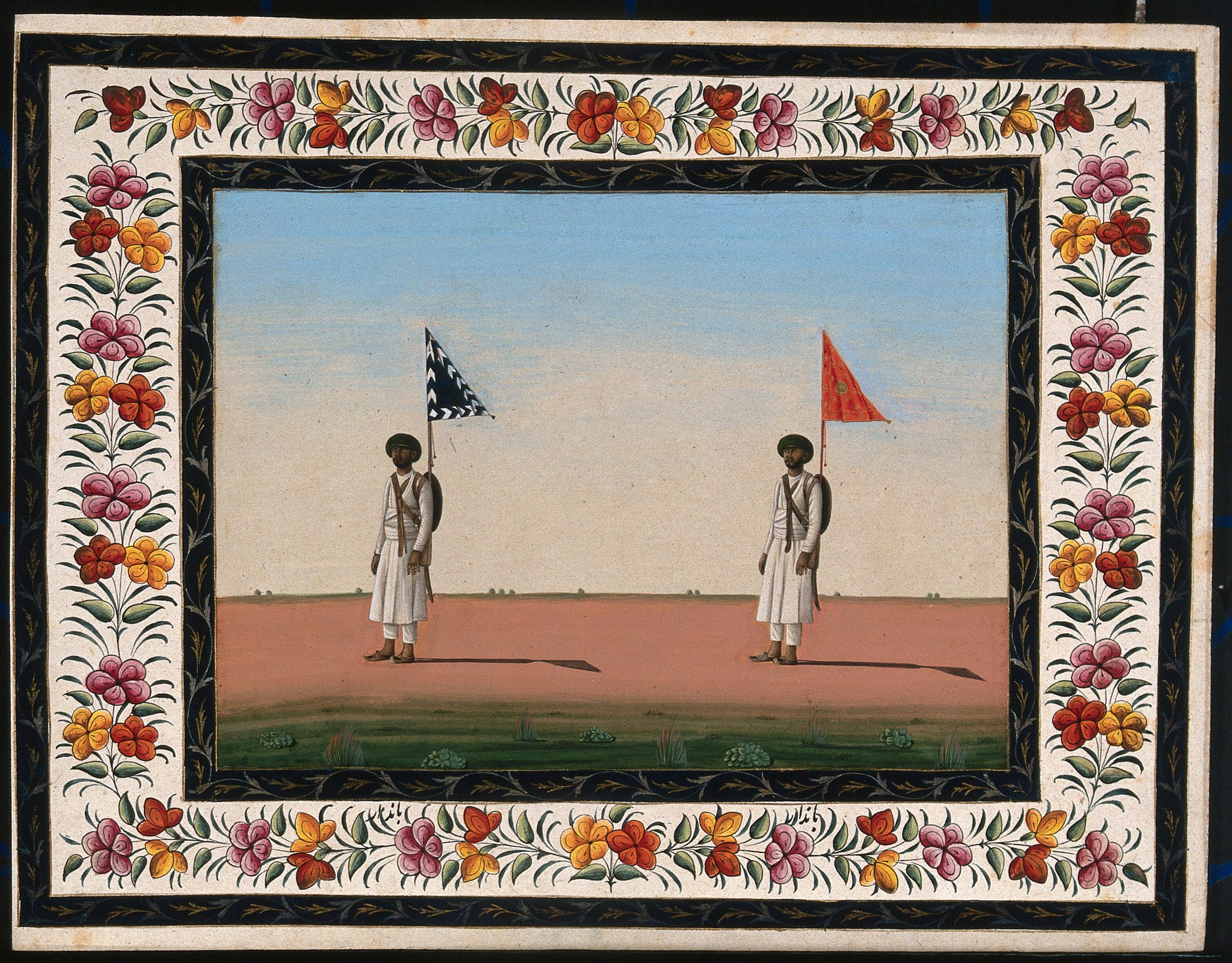
Illustration depicting two rocket-men (Baan-daar) carrying rockets with flags hoisted on their bamboo shafts.

Two rocket units were fielded by Tipu Sultan in 1792 during the Third Anglo-Mysore War, one of 120 men and the other of 131 men. Lt. Col. Knox was attacked by rockets near Srirangapatna on the night of 6 February 1792 while advancing towards the Kaveri River from the north. The Rocket Corps ultimately reached a strength of about 5,000 in Tipu Sultan's army. Mysore rockets were also used for ceremonial purposes. The Jacobin Club of Mysore sent a delegation to Tipu Sultan, and 500 rockets were launched as part of the gun salute.

Rockets were again used on several occasions during the Fourth Anglo-Mysore War. One of these involved Colonel Arthur Wellesley, later famous as the First Duke of Wellington. Wellesley was almost defeated by Tipu's Diwan Purnaiah at the Battle of Sultanpet Tope.

Wellesley launched a fresh attack with a larger force the following day, and took the whole position without losing a single man. Rocketeers worked their way around to the rear of the British encampment on 22 April 1799, 12 days before the main battle, and fired a large number of rockets at the same moment to signal the beginning of an assault by 6,000 Indian infantry and a corps of Frenchmen, all directed by Mir Golam Hussain and Mohomed Hulleen Mir Mirans. The rockets had a range of about 1,000 yd (910 m). Some burst in the air like shells, while others (called ground rockets) would rise again on striking the ground and bound along in a serpentine motion until their force was spent. A young English officer named Bayly observed: "So pestered were we with the rocket boys that there was no moving without danger from the destructive missiles". He continued:

The rockets and musketry from 20,000 of the enemy were incessant. No hail could be thicker. Every illumination of blue lights was accompanied by a shower of rockets, some of which entered the head of the column, passing through to the rear, causing death, wounds, and dreadful lacerations from the long bamboos of twenty or thirty feet, which are invariably attached to them.

A British shot struck a magazine of rockets within Tipu Sultan's fort during the decisive British attack on Srirangapattana on 2 May 1799, causing it to explode and send a towering cloud of black smoke with cascades of exploding white light rising up from the battlements. Baird led the final attack on the fort on the afternoon of 4 May and was again met by "furious musket and rocket fire", but this did not help much; the fort was taken in about an hour's time. Perhaps within another hour Tipu had been shot (the precise time of his death is not known), and the war was effectively over.

== British adoption of the technology ==
After the fall of Srirangapattana, 600 launchers, 700 serviceable rockets, and 9,000 empty rockets were found. Some of the rockets had pierced cylinders, to allow them to act like incendiaries, while some had iron points or steel blades bound to the bamboo. By attaching these blades to rockets they became very unstable towards the end of their flight.

These experiences eventually led the Royal Woolwich Arsenal to start a military rocket research and development program in 1801, based on the Mysorean technology. Several rocket cases were collected from Mysore and sent to Britain for analysis. Their first demonstration of solid-fuel rockets came in 1805 and was followed by publication of A Concise Account of the Origin and Progress of the Rocket System in 1807 by William Congreve, son of the arsenal's commandant. Congreve rockets were systematically used by the British during the Napoleonic Wars and the War of 1812. They were also used in the 1814 Battle of Baltimore, and are mentioned in "The Star-Spangled Banner", the national anthem of the United States: And the rockets' red glare, the bombs bursting in air.

== Discovery ==
In 2002, a cache of metallic shells was unearthed during restoration of an old well in Nagara, 60 kilometres from Shivamogga. About one hundred of these rusted cylindrical shells were stored in Shivappa Nayaka Palace Government Museum identified only as 'shells' and without being registered in museum catalog. In 2010, these shells were identified to have a possible link to King Tipu's rockets. And only in 2013, these shells were recognized for their significance.

In April 2017, 102 unused rockets of varying sizes were found in Shimoga district.

In July 2018, another 500 rockets (or 1,000, according to one source) were found in an abandoned well in the same area, confirming it as a major repository and fort under the King Tipu Sultan.

As of November 2019, more than 3,000 such rockets have been recovered during debris clearances undertaken in Nagara.

== See also ==
- Bō-hiya
