= Battle of Pollilur (1780) =

Battle of the Second Anglo-Mysore War

- Part of the Second Anglo-Mysore War
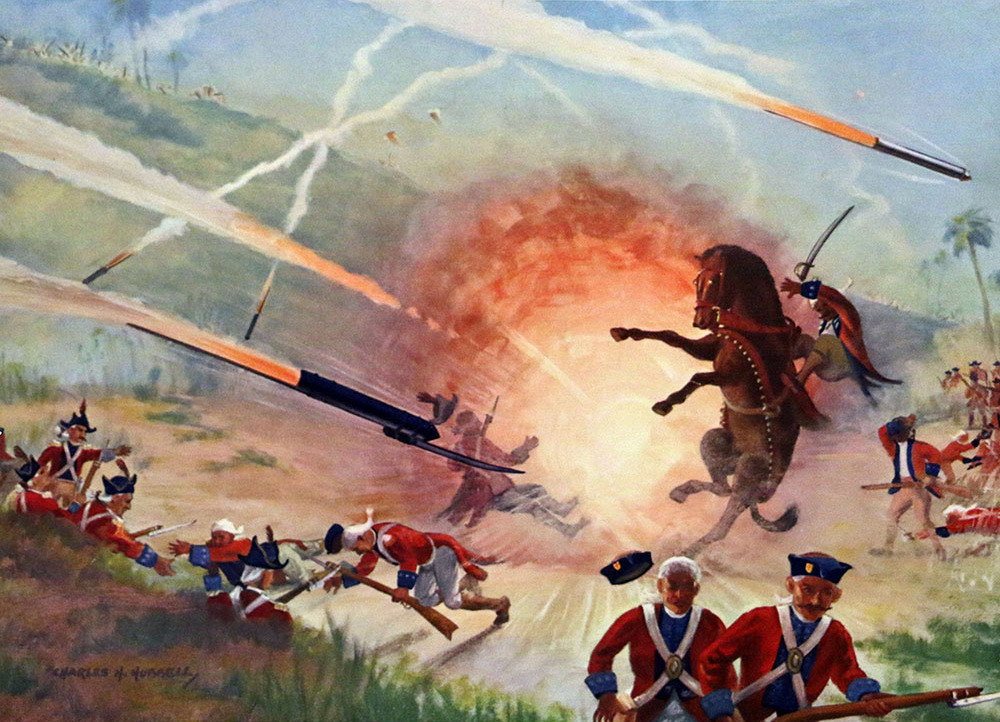
- Illustration of the battle
Date	10 September 1780
Location	Pullalur, Kanchipuram
Result	Mysorean victory

Belligerents
Sultanate of Mysore	East India Company

Commanders and leaders
Tipu Sultan; Sultan Hyder Ali	William Baille (surrendered)

Strength
11,000 in total	3,853

Casualties and losses
Unknown	2,016 killed 1,000 captured

The Battle of Pollilur (a.k.a. Pullalur), also known as the Battle of Polilore or Battle of Perambakam, took place on 10 September 1780 at Pollilur near Conjeevaram, the city of Kanchipuram in present-day Tamil Nadu state, India, as part of the Second Anglo-Mysore War. It was fought between an army commanded by King Tipu Sultan of the Kingdom of Mysore, and a British East India Company force led by William Baillie. The EIC force suffered a high number of casualties before surrendering. It was fought between a Brigade Column of the East India Company, led by Colonel William Baillie, and the Mysore Army, under the command of Haidar Ali and Tipu Sultan. It was the worst loss the East India Company suffered on the subcontinent until Chillianwala. Benoît de Boigne, a French officer in the service of 6th Regiment of Madras Native Infantry, wrote, "There is not in India an example of a similar defeat".

== Background ==
King Tipu prevented Baillie from joining another force, consisting of two companies of European infantry, two batteries of artillery, and five battalions of native infantry from Guntur led by Hector Munro at Conjeevaram, while King Tipu's father King Hyder Ali continued the siege at Arcot.

== Battle ==
Baillie's men, suffering desertions and uncoordinated leadership, formed a defensive square on a patch of high ground, with William Baillie leading a final stand. Cut off from both Conjeevaram and the stronghold of Fort St. George in Madras where a larger EIC force remained encamped, Baillie's men were caught in a double envelopment movement, encircled and routed. Of the men under Baillie's command, only 50 European officers and 150 men were taken prisoner after the "general massacre". Baillie was taken to Seringapatam (Srirangapatnam near Mysore in the present-day Karnataka state). Pullalur was also the site of the Battle of Pullalur, where the king of Badami Chalukya, Pulakesin II fought the Pallava king, Mahendravarman I, in the 7th century.

== Aftermath ==
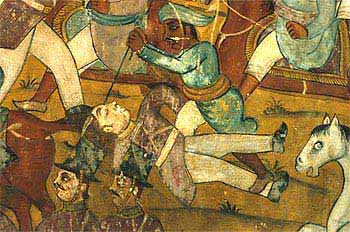
Mural of the battle on the walls of King Tipu's summer palace.

Baillie and many of his officers were captured and taken to the Mysore capital at Seringapatam. After British reinforcements from Calcutta arrived, Eyre Coote was able to stabilise the situation and counter-attack. A second battle was fought a year later in the same area, resulting in a drawn battle where both sides retreated and claimed victory.

== Rockets ==
The Mysore rockets used during the battle were much more advanced than the British East India Company had previously seen, chiefly because of the use of iron tubes for holding the propellant; this enabled higher thrust and longer range for the missile (up to 2 km range). At Pollilur, Mysore rockets restricted the British vanguard movement, skimming along the surface, lacerating troops, and in one specific instance, shattering an Ensign’s leg. After King Tipu Sultan's eventual defeat in the Fourth Anglo-Mysore War and the capture of the Mysore iron rockets, they were influential in British rocket development, inspiring the Congreve rocket, which was soon put into use in the Napoleonic Wars.

== Gallery ==
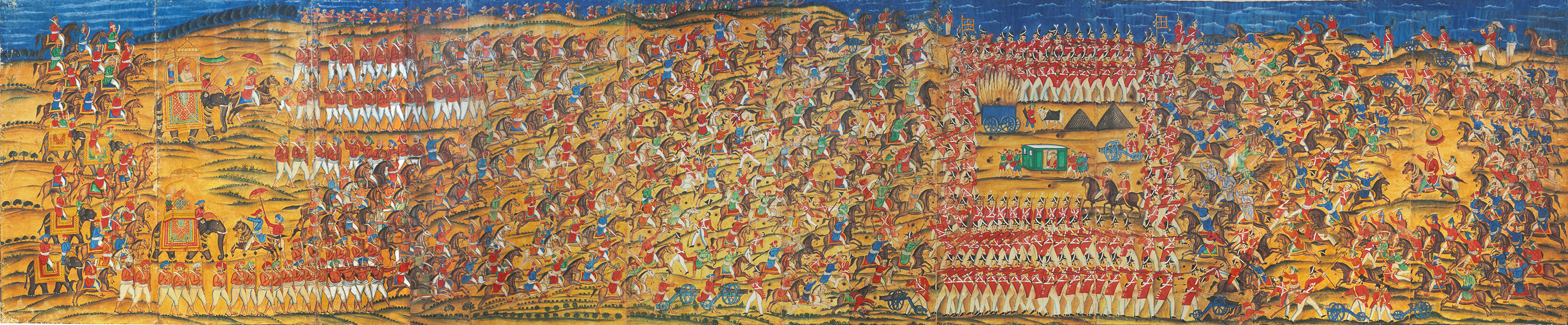
Tipu Sultan commissioned The Battle of Pollilur for the Daria Daulat Bagh to monumentalize his victory; early 19th-century, gouache on paper, 10 sheets of paper on canvas, mounted on restoration fabric, 962 × 200 cm, private collection.
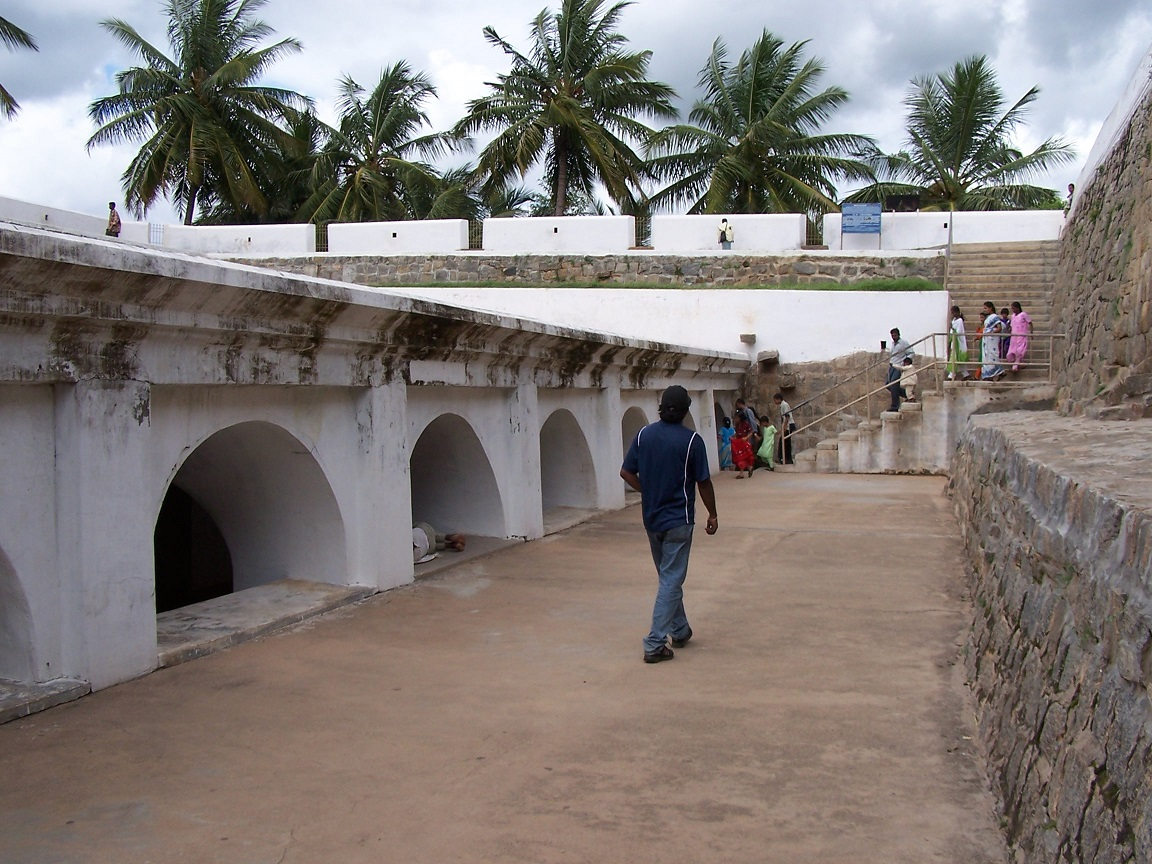
Baillie Dungeon, Seringapatam (2004)

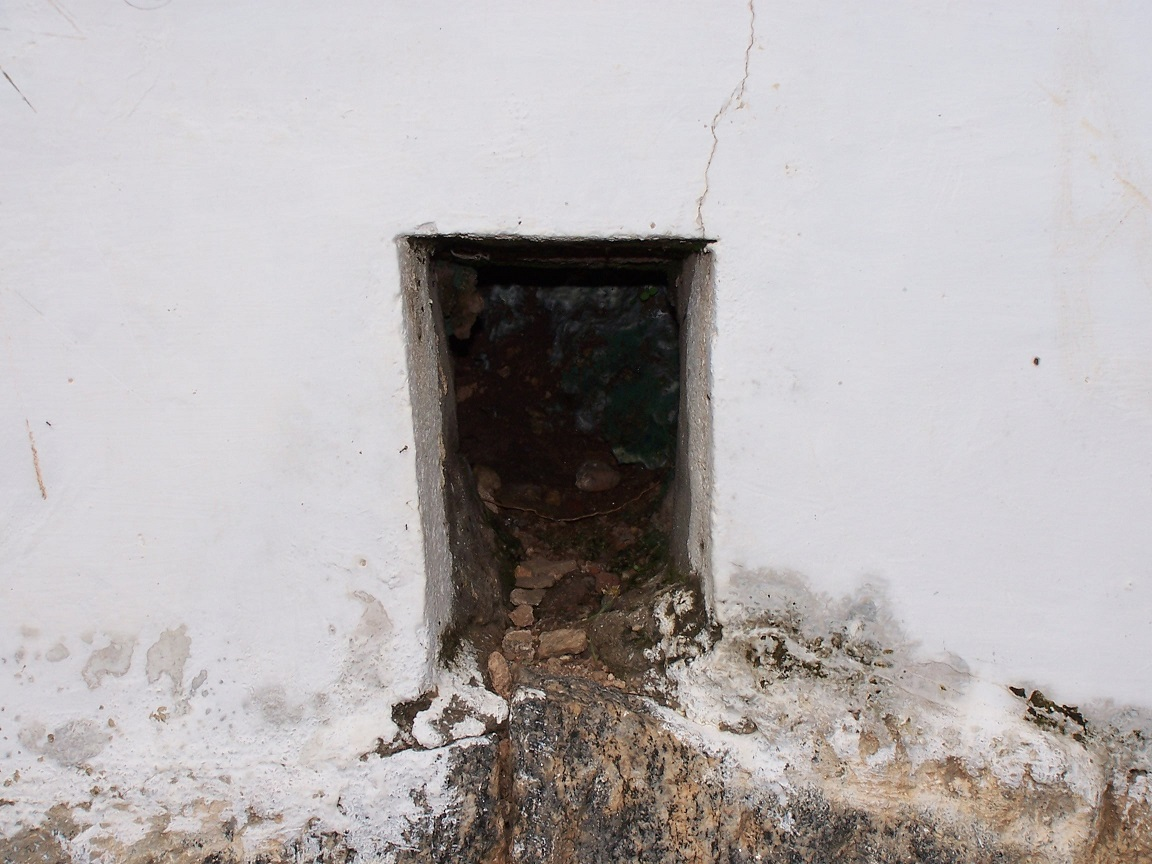
Narrow Passage to Colonel Baillie's Dungeon, Seringapatam (2004)

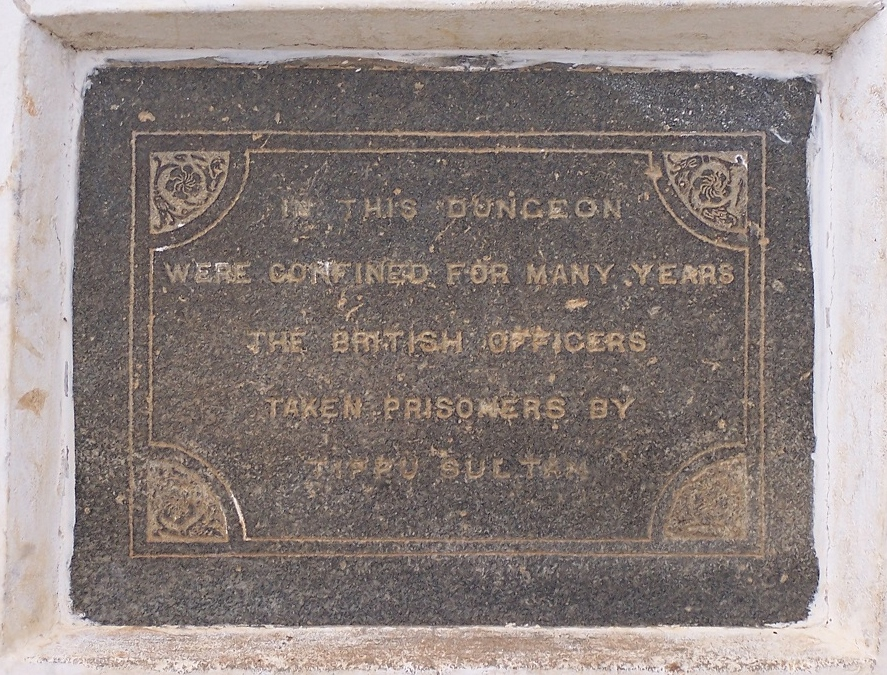
Memorial Plaque at Baillie Dungeon, Seringapatam

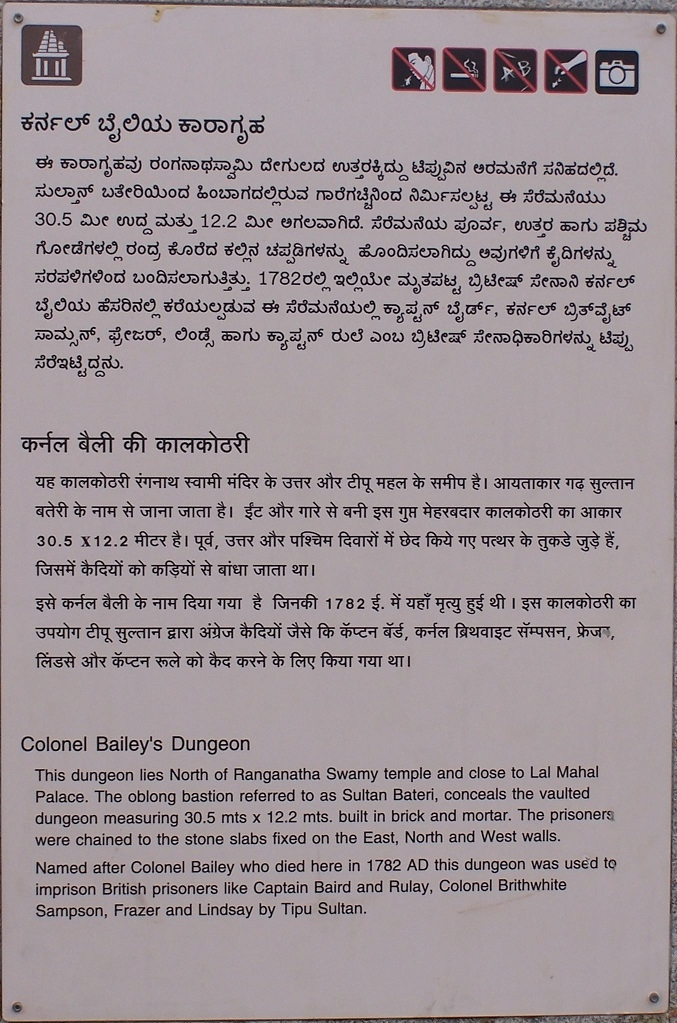
Signboard at Baillie Dungeon, Seringapatam

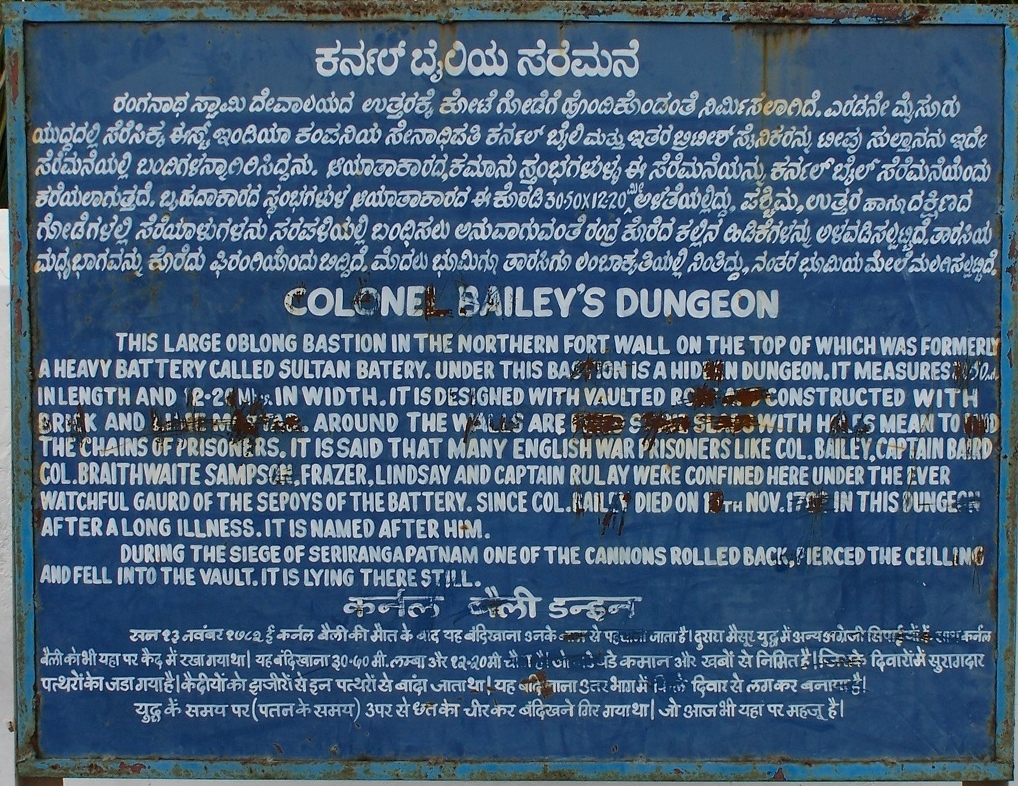
Old Signboard at Baillie Dungeon, Seringapatam

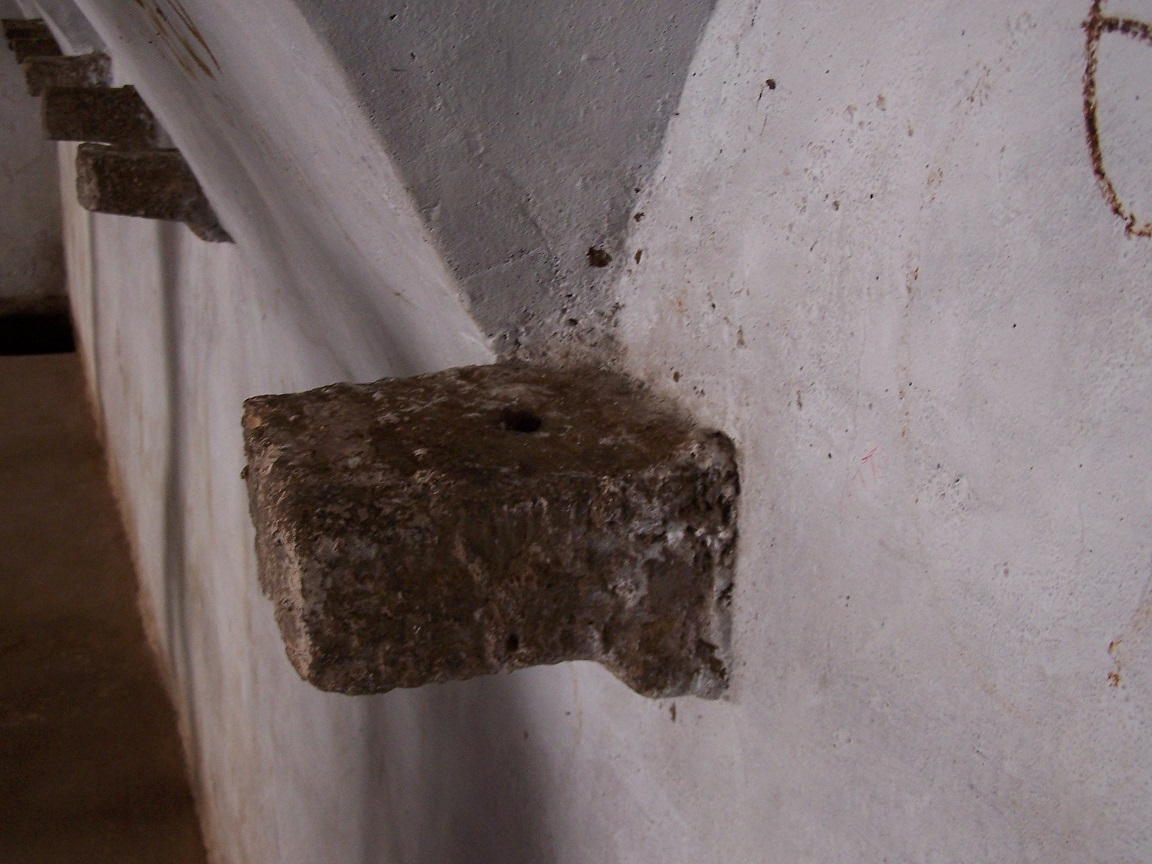
Stones to which prisoners were tied, Baillie Dungeon, Seringapatam

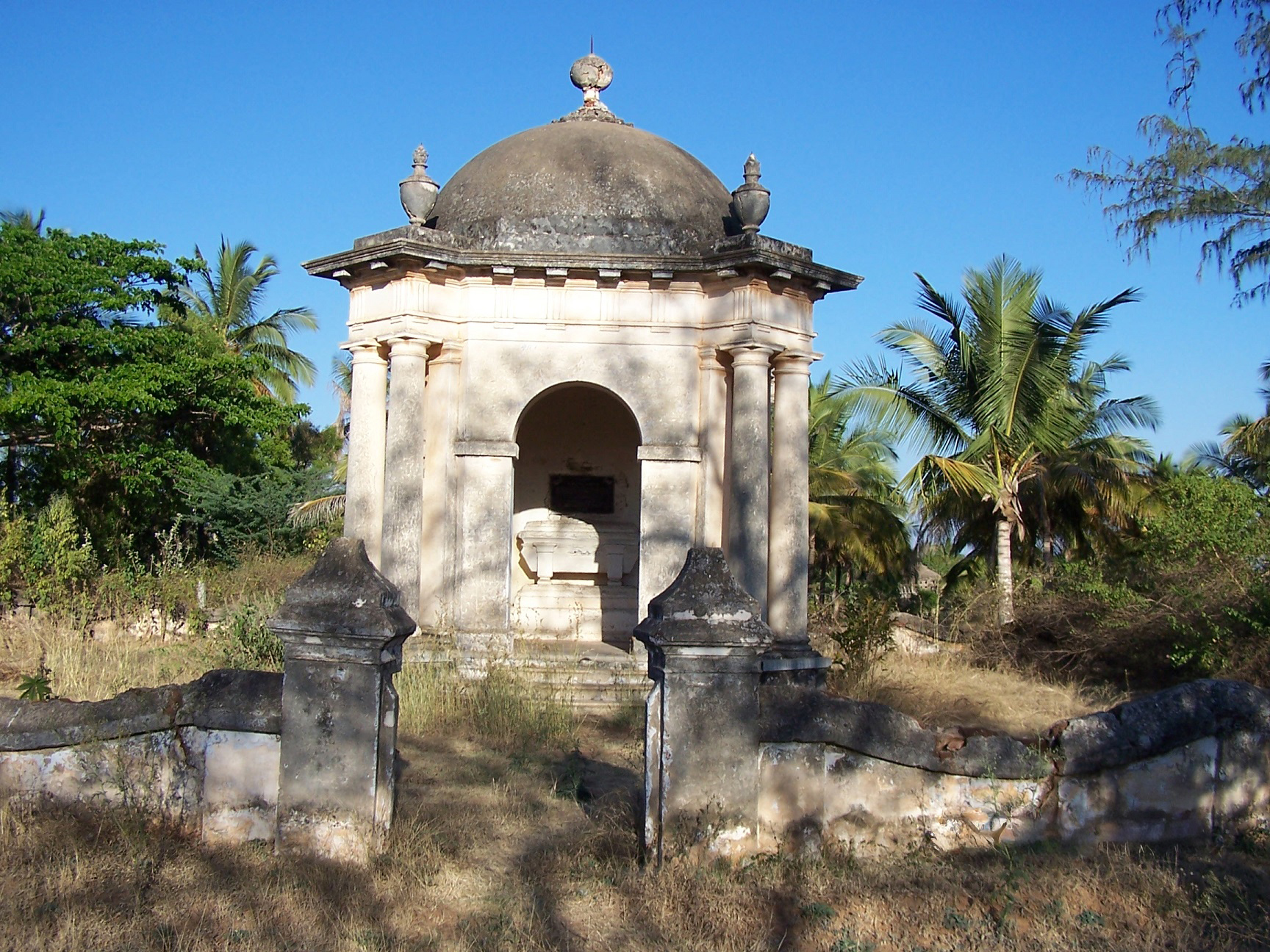
William Baillie Memorial, Seringapatam

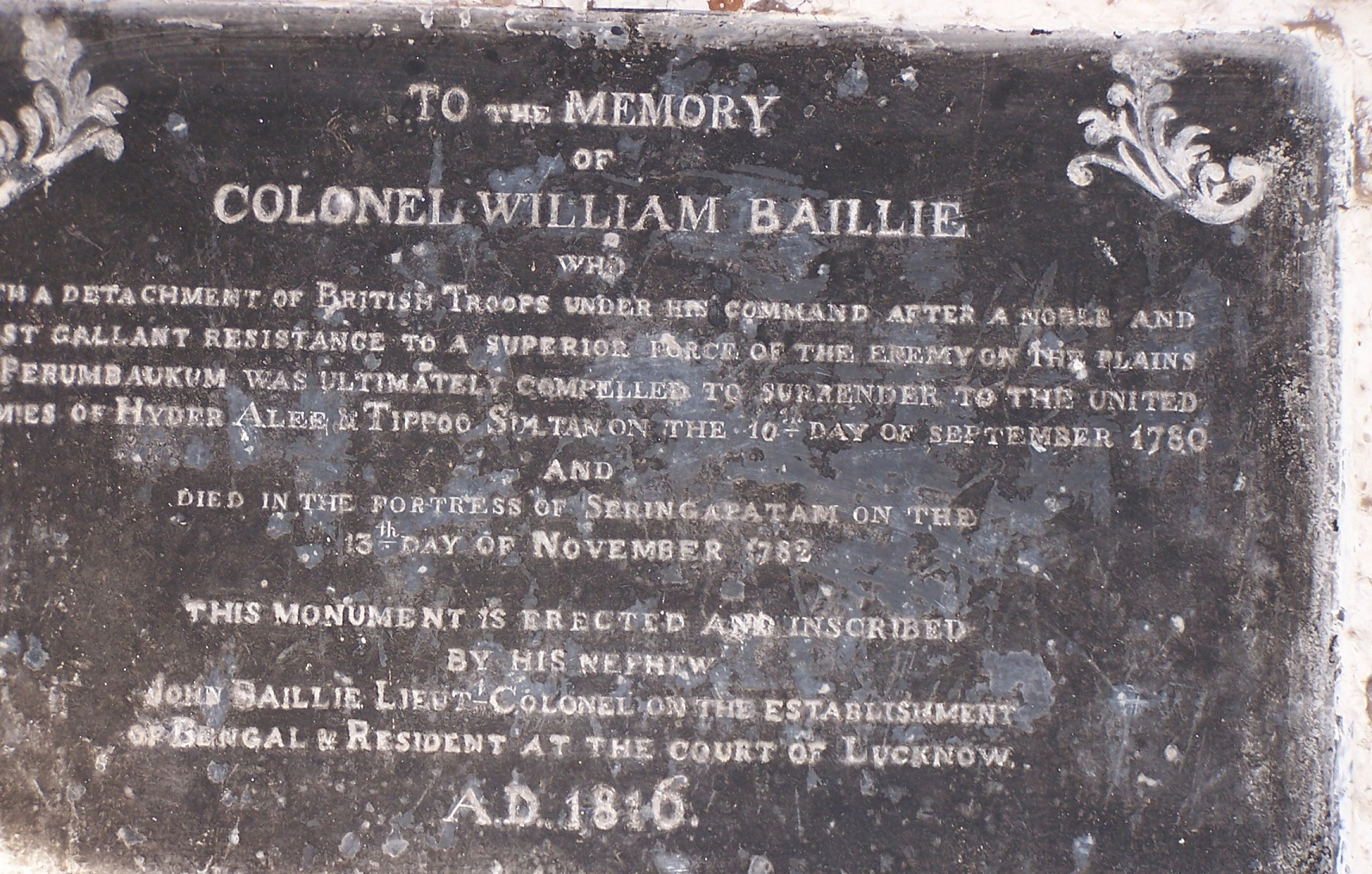
Plaque of the William Baillie Memorial, Seringapatam

== See also ==
- Tipu Sultan
- Hyder Ali
- Mughal weapons
