= Battle of Pollilur (1781) =

1781 Battle of the Second Anglo-Mysore War

- Part of the Second Anglo-Mysore War
Date	27 August 1781; 244 years ago
Location	Pollilur, Kanchipuram, India 12°58′N 79°42′E
Result	British victory

Belligerents
East India Company	Mysore

Commanders and leaders
Eyre Coote	Hyder Ali

Strength
11,000	Unknown

Casualties and losses
421	2,000+
- Location within Tamil Nadu Pollilur (India)

The Battle of Pollilur was fought on 27 August 1781, between forces of the Kingdom of Mysore under Hyder Ali and British East India Company forces led by General Eyre Coote. The battle was fought on the site of a 1780 encounter in which a Company force was almost completely routed or captured.

In the 1781 battle, the company's army was organized into two lines. One line fought against the troops under Tipu Sultan. But Hyder Ali's army faced severe casualties and retreated to Kanchipuram.

After the battle, a shortage of provisions led Coote to move his forces toward Tripassore. Both the sides retreated in a drawn battle and both claimed victory by firing a salute though the British claimed "dubious victory".

== Battlefield today ==
Much of the battle site has been altered owing to paddy cultivation. Two obelisks stand in memory of two officers who served in the army of East India Company. They stand on a higher ground than the surroundings and the inscribed text is very light and faded. Colonel George Brown and Captain James Hislop are remembered in the obelisks.

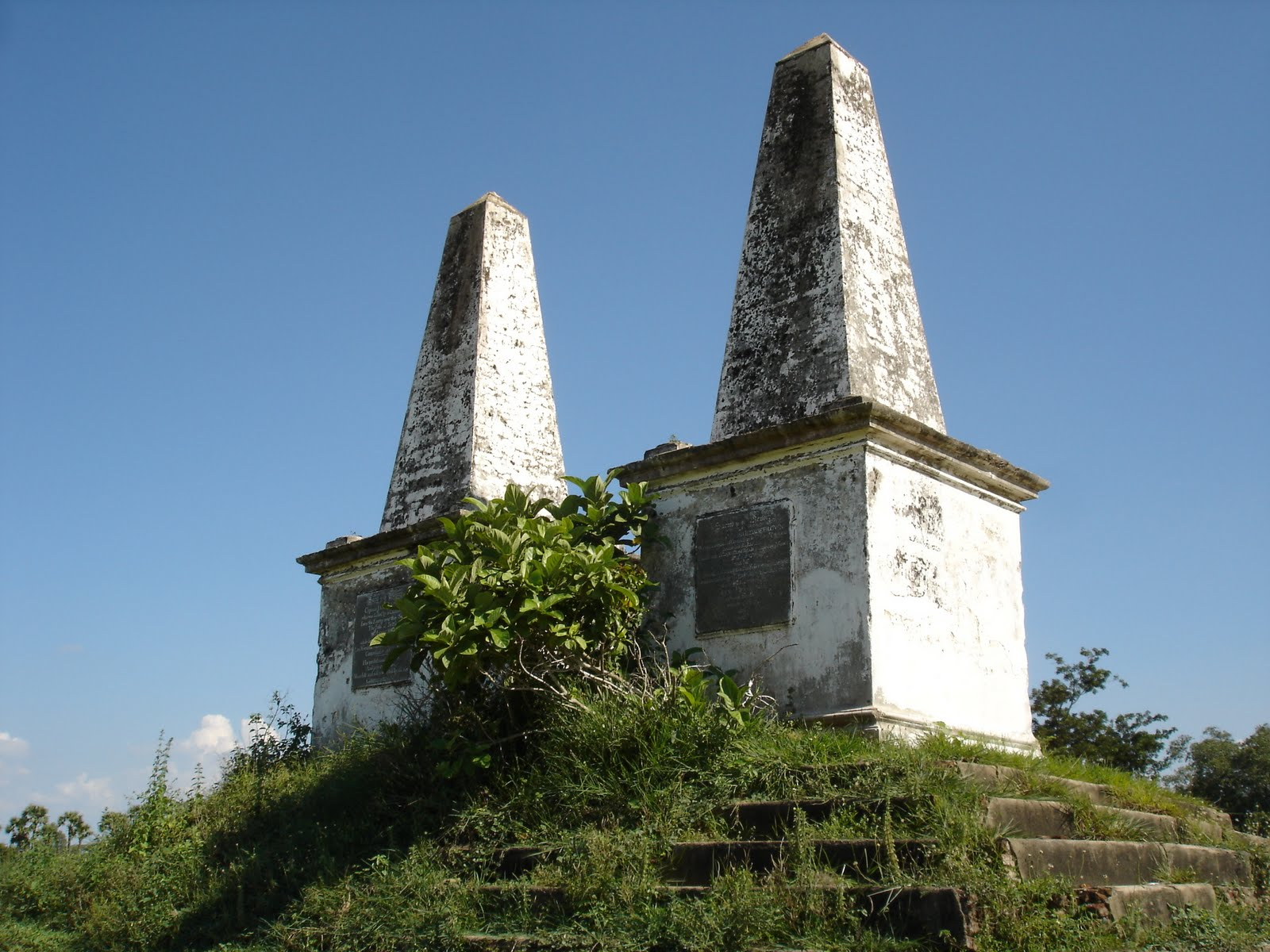
Front view of obelisks

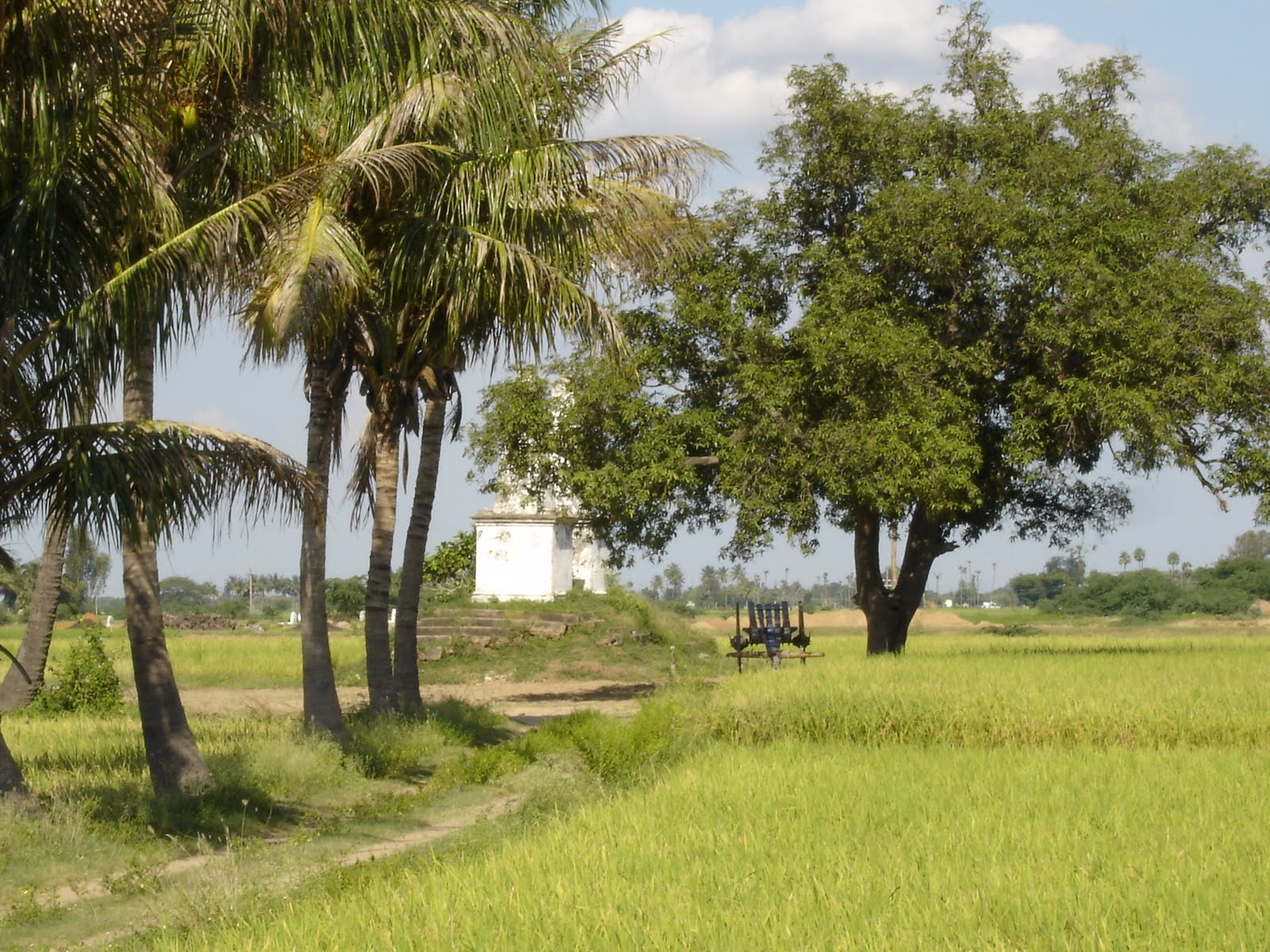
Location of Pullalur obelisks situated amidst paddy fields and coconut grove

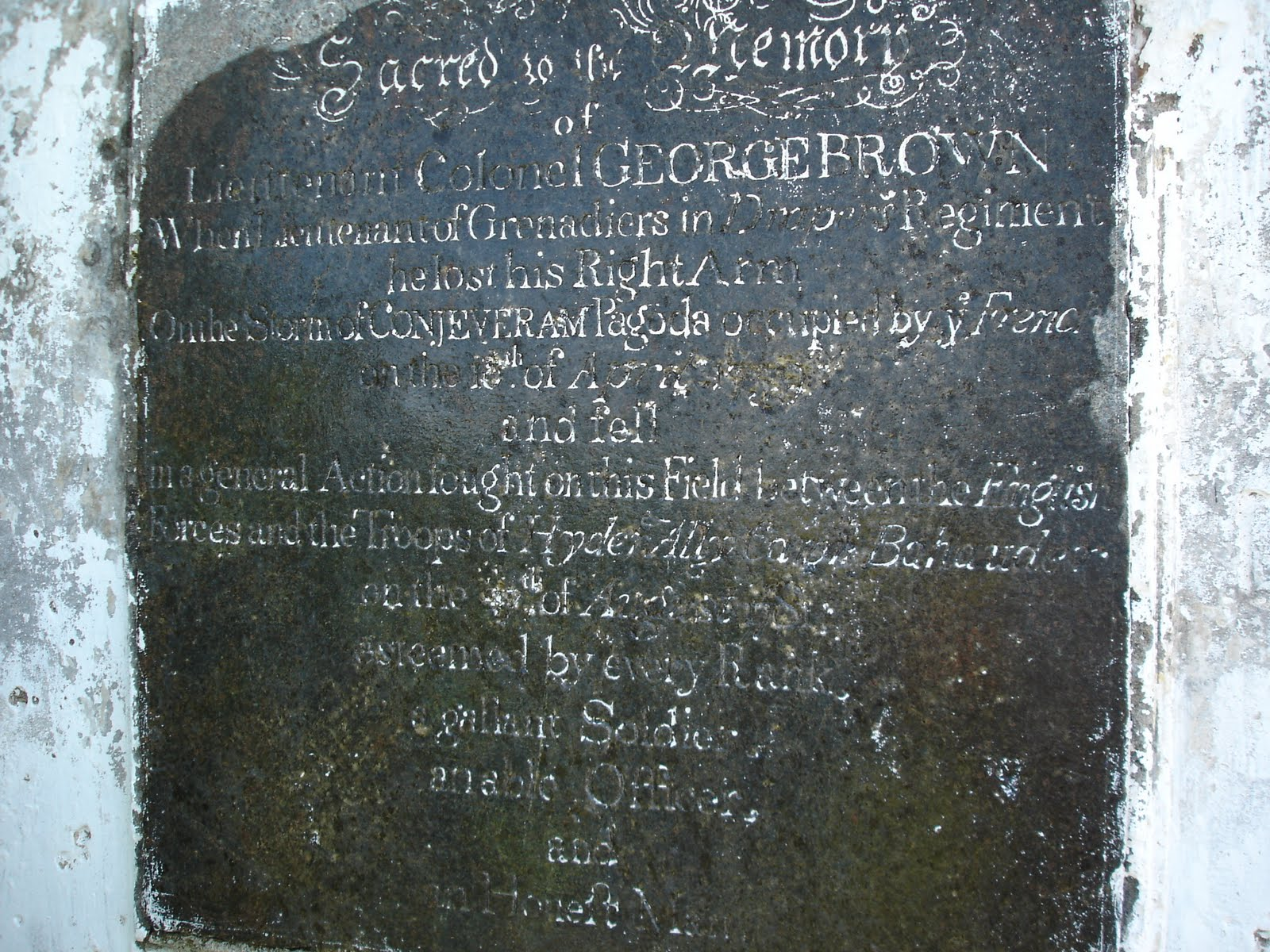
Lieu Col George Brown remembered in this obelisk, text is quite faded and very hard to read in certain places.

The obelisk dedicated to Lieutenant Colonel George Brown bears the following text:

Sacred to the Memory of Lieutenant Colonel George Brown

When Lieutenant of Grenadiers in Draper's Regiment

he lost his Right Arm on the storm of Conjevearam Pagoda occupied by Ye French

on the 18th of April ???? and fell in a general Action fought on this Field between the English

Forces and the Troops of Hyder Ally??? Bahaduer on the 27th of August 1781

esteemed by every Rank a gallant Soldier, an able Officer, and, an Honest Man.

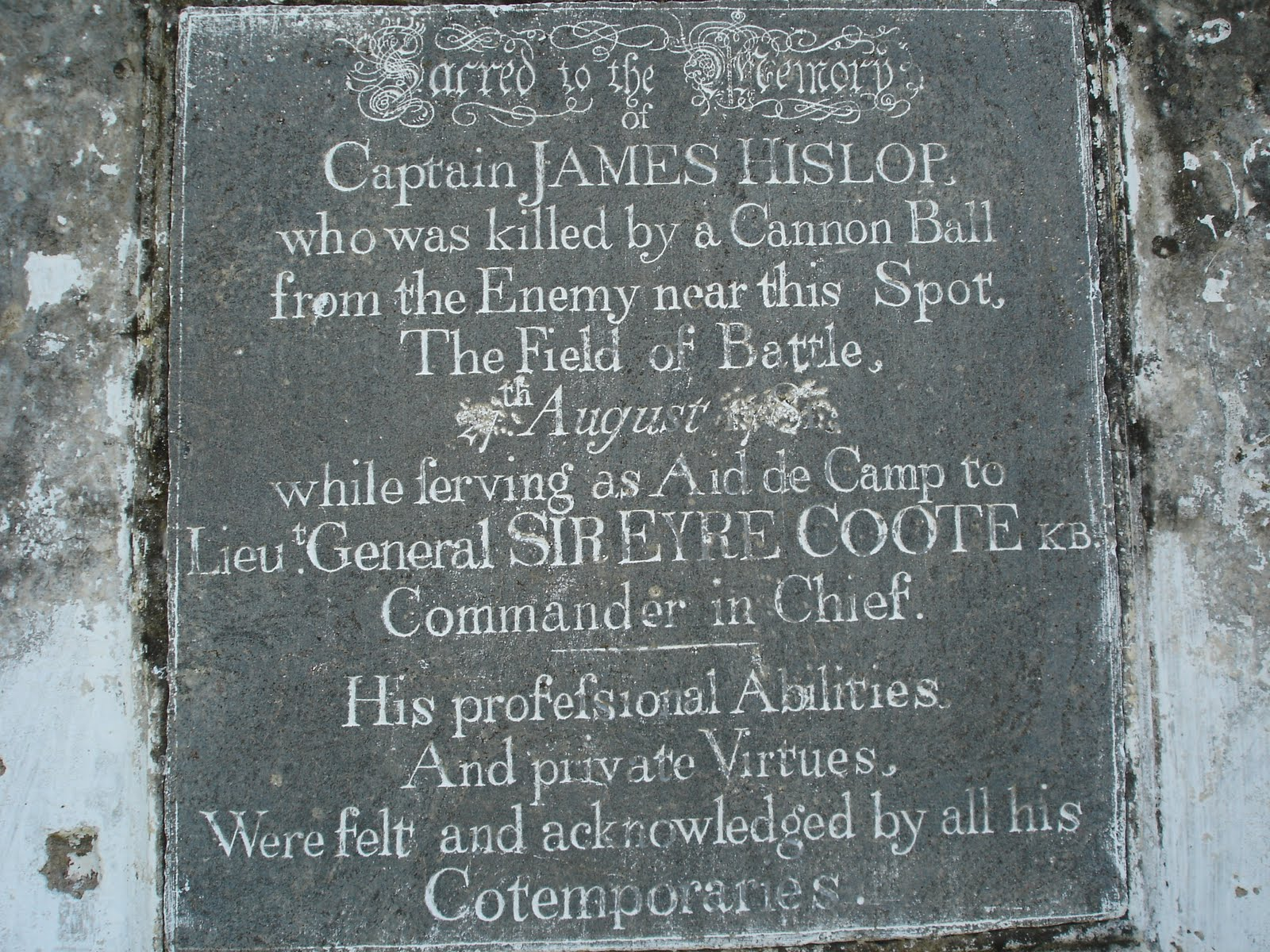
Cap James Hislop remembered in this obelisk, dates are not visible as the text is hardly legible.

The second obelisk, in memory of Captain James Hislop, displays the following text:

Sacred to the memory of Captain James Hislop

who was killed by a Cannon Ball from the Enemy near this Spot,

The Field of Battle, 27 August 1781 while serving as Aid de Camp to

Lieut. General Sir Eyre Coote KB. Commander in Chief

------------------

His professional Abilities and private Virtues,

Were felt and acknowledged by all his Contemporaries.

== Bibliography ==
- Roy, Kaushik. War, Culture, Society in Early Modern South Asia, 1740-1849. Routledge, 2011.
- Vibart, H. M (1881). The military history of the Madras engineers and pioneers, from 1743 up to the present time, Volume 1
