= Pullalur =

Coordinates: 12°58′N 79°42′E

- village
- Interactive map of Pullalur
- Country: India
- State: Tamil Nadu
- District: Kanchipuram

Population (2001)
  - Total: 2,690

Languages
  - Official: Tamil
- Time zone: UTC+5:30 (IST)

Pullalur or Pollilur is a village in the Kanchipuram taluk of Kanchipuram district in Tamil Nadu, India. The village has been the site of three historic battles - the Battle of Pullalur fought between the Chalukya king Pulakesin II and the Pallava king Mahendravarman I in 611-12, the Battle of Pollilur (1780) and Battle of Pollilur (1781) of the Second Anglo-Mysore War between Hyder Ali and the East India Company.

== Demographics ==
As per the 2001 census, Pullalur had a population of 2,690 with 1,315 males and 1,375 females. The sex ratio was 1046 and the literacy rate, 63.52.
