= Battle of Pullalur =

Battle in South India

- Part of Chalukya–Pallava Wars
| Date | 618–619 |
| Location | Pullalur or Pollilur |
| Result | Chalukyan victory |

Belligerents
| Chalukya Empire | Pallava kingdom |

Commanders and leaders
| Pulakeshin II | Mahendravarman I, Paranjothi |

Strength
| Unknown | Unknown |

The Battle of Pullalur was fought between the Chalukya king Pulakesin II and the Pallava king Mahendravarman I in the town of Pullalur (or Pollilur) in about 618–19.

== Causes ==
The rapid expansion of the Chalukya Empire had resulted in the Chalukya annexation of the Vishnukundin kingdom. The Vishnukundina dynasty were allies of the Pallavas of Kanchi who were emerging as a major power in the 6th century AD. This embittered the Pallavas against them and a large number of battles were fought.

== Events ==
In about 617–18, Pulakesin II invaded and annexed Vengi. After his success against Vengi, he proceeded southwards and confining the Pallavas to the area around Kanchi. The Pallava king Mahendravarman I met Pulakesin at the town of Pullalur or Pollilur, about nine miles north of Kanchi. In the ensuing battle, Mahendravarman is believed to have given Pulikesin II a devastating defeat.

The Aihole inscription of Pulakesin II gives a detailed description of the battle

With his sixfold forces, the hereditary troops and the rest, who raised spotless chowries, hundreds of flags, umbrellas and darkness, who churned the enemy elated with the sentiments of heroism and energy, he caused the splendour of the lord of the Pallavas, who had opposed the rise of his power to be obscured by the dust of his army and to vanish behind the walls of Kanchipura

But Historians contradicts this inscription as not so true as Pallavas are ascending in power and had advanced military than Chalukyas

The Kasakudi plates state:

Then the earth was ruled by a king called Mahendravarman who annihilated his chief enemies at Pullalura

While Mahendravarman's enemies are not mentioned by name, some historians interpret this edit as a description of Pallava victory over the Chalukyas. However, many feel that a Pallava victory might have been most probable as there are evidences of the Chalukya army's incursions as far south and rapidly retreating after the battle.

== Aftermath ==
Following this, Pulakesin attacked Kanchi but unable to penetrate the defences of the Pallava capital, he proceeded southwards and tried to ravage the northern and central parts of Tamil Nadu intruding as far as the Kaveri River. Then, after Pallavas and Cholas opposition, unable to accept his submission, Pulakesin II returned to Vatapi.

== Bibliography ==
- Dikshit, D. P. (1980). Political History of the Chalukyas of Badami. Abhinav Publications.
- Heras, H. (1933). Studies in Pallava History. Madras: B. G. Paul and Co.
