= Clydach =

Clydach may refer to any of various settlements and rivers in South Wales:

- Clydach, Monmouthshire (village)
- Clydach, Swansea (village)

- Clydach (electoral ward), an electoral ward in the City and County of Swansea

- Clydach Gorge, (Welsh Cwm Clydach) Monmouthshire
- River Clydach, Monmouthshire, (Welsh Afon Clydach)
- Lower Clydach River, Swansea Valley
- Upper Clydach River, Swansea Valley
- River Clydach (Neath), tributary of River Neath at Neath
- Clydach Vale, (Rhondda Cynon Taff)

== See also ==
- Cwm Clydach (disambiguation)
