= Cwm Clydach =

Cwm Clydach (Cwm is Welsh for "valley" and Clydach is a popular river name) may refer to:

== Places ==
- Cwm Clydach, Kidwelly, a site of special scientific interest (SSSI) near Kidwelly, Carmarthenshire
- Cwm Clydach National Nature Reserve, on the Clydach Gorge in Blaenau Gwent
- Cwm Clydach RSPB Reserve, near the village of Clydach, Swansea
- Cwm Clydach, Rhondda Cynon Taf, a community and electoral ward in Rhondda Cynon Taf based around the village of Clydach Vale
- Cwm Clydach, the Welsh language name for Clydach Vale, a village in Rhondda Cynon Taf
- Clydach Gorge (Blaenau Gwent), also known as Cwm Clydach

== See also ==
- Clydach (disambiguation), in particular for rivers with that name
