= Smart's Bridge =

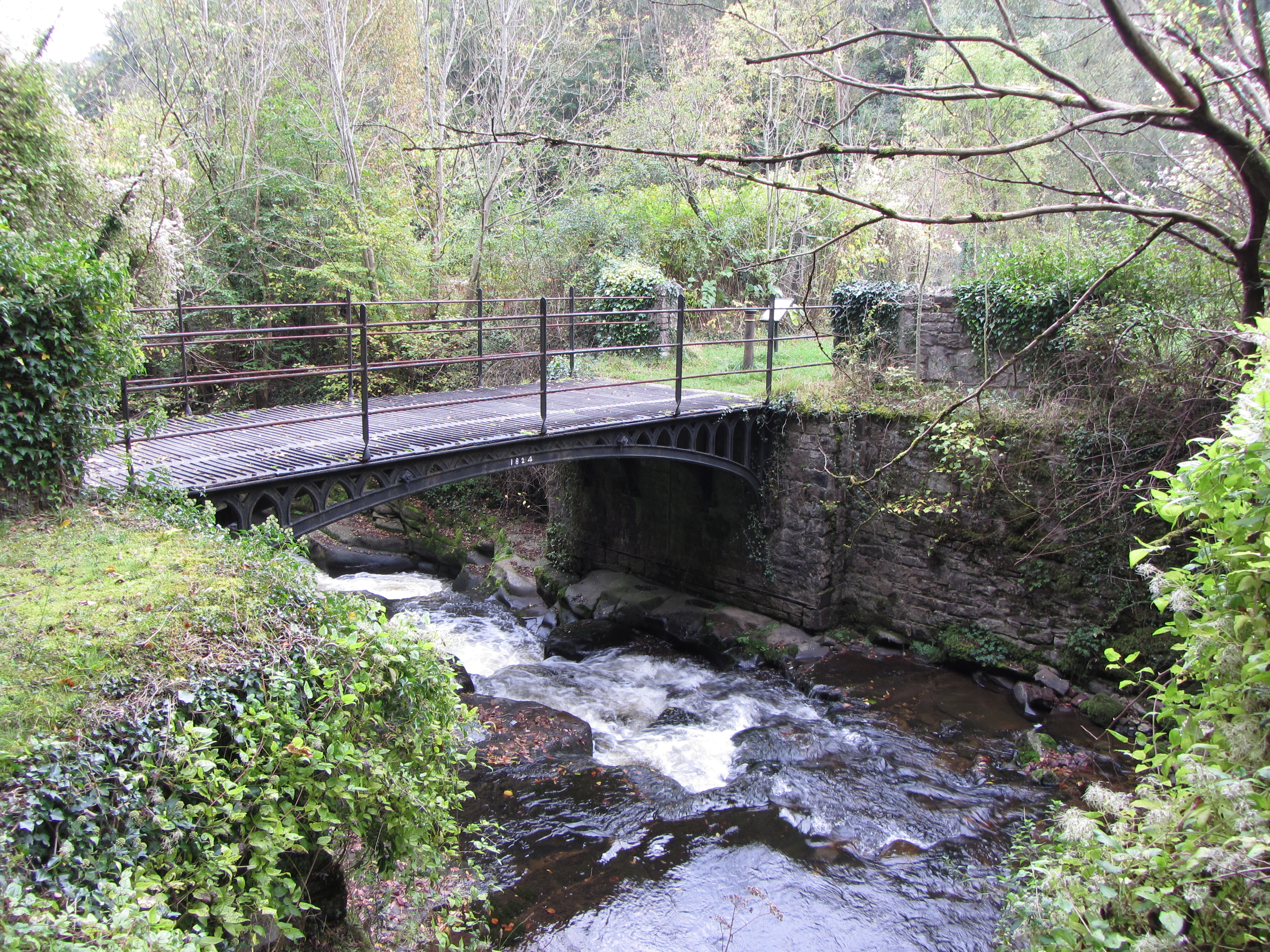
- Coordinates: 51.8127°N 3.1202°W
- Crosses: River Clydach
- Locale: Llanelly, Monmouthshire, Wales

Characteristics
- Material: Cast iron
- Total length: 2.09 m (6 ft 10 in)
- No. of spans: 1

History
- Construction start: 1824
- Construction end: 1824

Statistics
- Daily traffic: tram (original) / pedestrian

Listed Building – Grade II*
- Official name: Smart's Bridge
- Designated: 27 July 2000
- Reference no.: 23813

Smart's Bridge, Llanelly, Monmouthshire, is a cast-iron bridge situated in Clydach Gorge. Constructed in 1824, it gave access to the Clydach Ironworks, the most significant industrial enterprise in the gorge. The bridge was designated a Grade II* listed structure in 2000.

== History ==
The Clydach Ironworks were established in 1793 by Edward Frere and Thomas Cooke, on land sublet from the Duke of Beaufort. By the early 19th century, the works were the major industrial enterprise in the gorge and Smart's Bridge was built in 1824 to give a tramway link from the works to the Clydach Railroad. By the mid 19th century, the firm was heavily in debt, and closed in 1861. The ironworks were bought, firstly, by the Clydach Sheet and Bar Iron Company, and, secondly, by the Brynmawr Coal and Iron Company, and finally closed in 1877.

In 1987, Blaenau Gwent County Borough Council took responsibility for the site, stabilised the remains, and opened it to the public.

== Architecture and description ==
The bridge is a single span, of cast iron, with "lancet tracery in the arch spandrels." The bridge is constructed on rubble piers and is 2.09 meters in length. The railings are replacements from the 1980s.
