= St Elli's Church =

St Elli's Church may refer to two churches in Wales.

- St Elli Church, Llanelli, Carmarthenshire
- St Elli's Church, Llanelly, Monmouthshire
