= St Elli's Church, Llanelly =

Coordinates: 51.827°N 3.1155°W

Church of St Elli
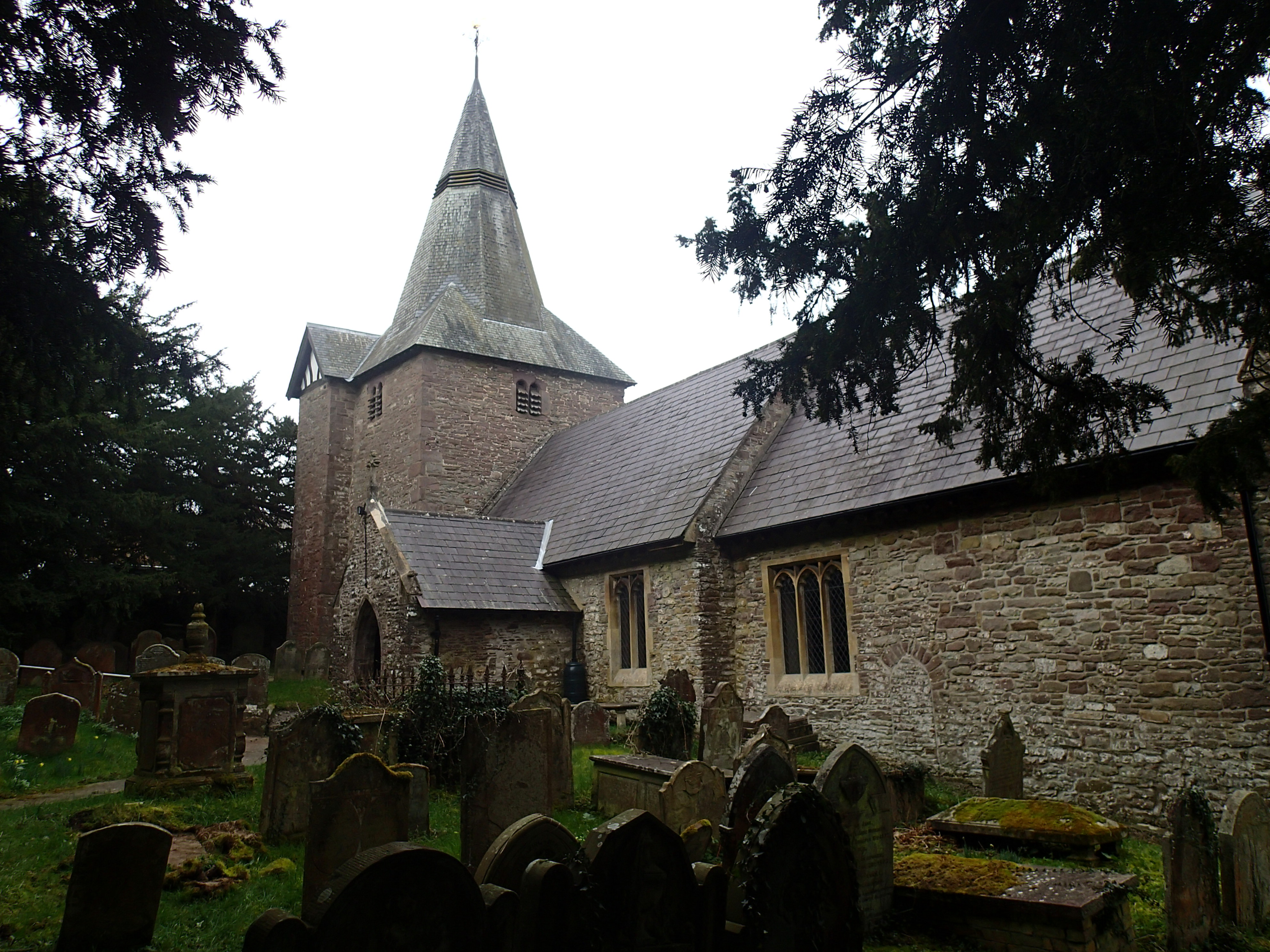
- "monuments of unusually high quality"

- Location in Monmouthshire
- Location: Llanelly, Monmouthshire
- Country: Wales
- Denomination: Church in Wales

History
- Status: parish church
- Founded: early 14th century

Architecture
- Functional status: Active
- Heritage designation: Grade II*
- Designated: 19 July 1963
- Architectural type: Church

Administration
- Diocese: Swansea and Brecon
- Archdeaconry: Brecon
- Deanery: Greater Brecon
- Parish: Llanelli

Clergy
- Vicar: The Reverend C J Bevan

The Church of St Elli, Llanelly, Monmouthshire, South East Wales, is a parish church with its origins in the 14th century. The church underwent three major restorations, in 1867–1868, 1897 and 1910–1911. It remains an active parish church and is a Grade II* listed building. The church is dedicated to the 6th-century Saint Elli.

== Dedication ==
The church carries a dedication to Saint Elli. The 19th-century Welsh historian Theophilus Jones disputed the dedication in his, A history of the County of Brecknock, writing "Llanelly is said to be dedicated to Saint Ellwy, the patroness of Llanelieu, but I think erroneously". He suggested that, like "many stately structures in Wales", the church was in fact dedicated to Saint Almeda. Following David Powel's History of Cambria, which was published in 1584, Jones described Almeda as "one of the daughters of Brychan", (Note: Canon Gabriel O'C. Redmond described Saint Almeda as the fourth of Brychan's daughters.) who was called Eilineth or Ellyned. An unsupported possibility is that the church is dedicated to a male disciple of Saint Cadoc. A later 19th-century history of the church by Arthur Mee supports Jones' interpretation.

== History ==
The church dates from the 14th century, or earlier, but little remains of this period. It is of the clas type and the church guide suggests that in origin it was a hermitage church, rather than one built to serve a village or community. The nave is medieval but its walls were all rebuilt in the restorations of the 19th and 20th centuries. The first of these rebuildings took place in 1867–1868, and was undertaken by the architect Joseph Nevill of Abergavenny. The spire dates from the restoration of 1897 by Baldwin of Brecon. The final rebuilding was undertaken by J. Vaughan Richards of Crickhowell in 1910–1911. The church contains the baptism record of Henry Bartle Frere, later Governor of Bombay and High Commissioner for Southern Africa, who was born at nearby Clydach House in 1815.

Until local government reorganisation of 1974, the parish of Llanelly was in the historic county of Brecknockshire and St Elli's remains an active church under the administration of the Diocese of Swansea and Brecon, although the parish is now in Monmouthshire.

== Architecture and description ==
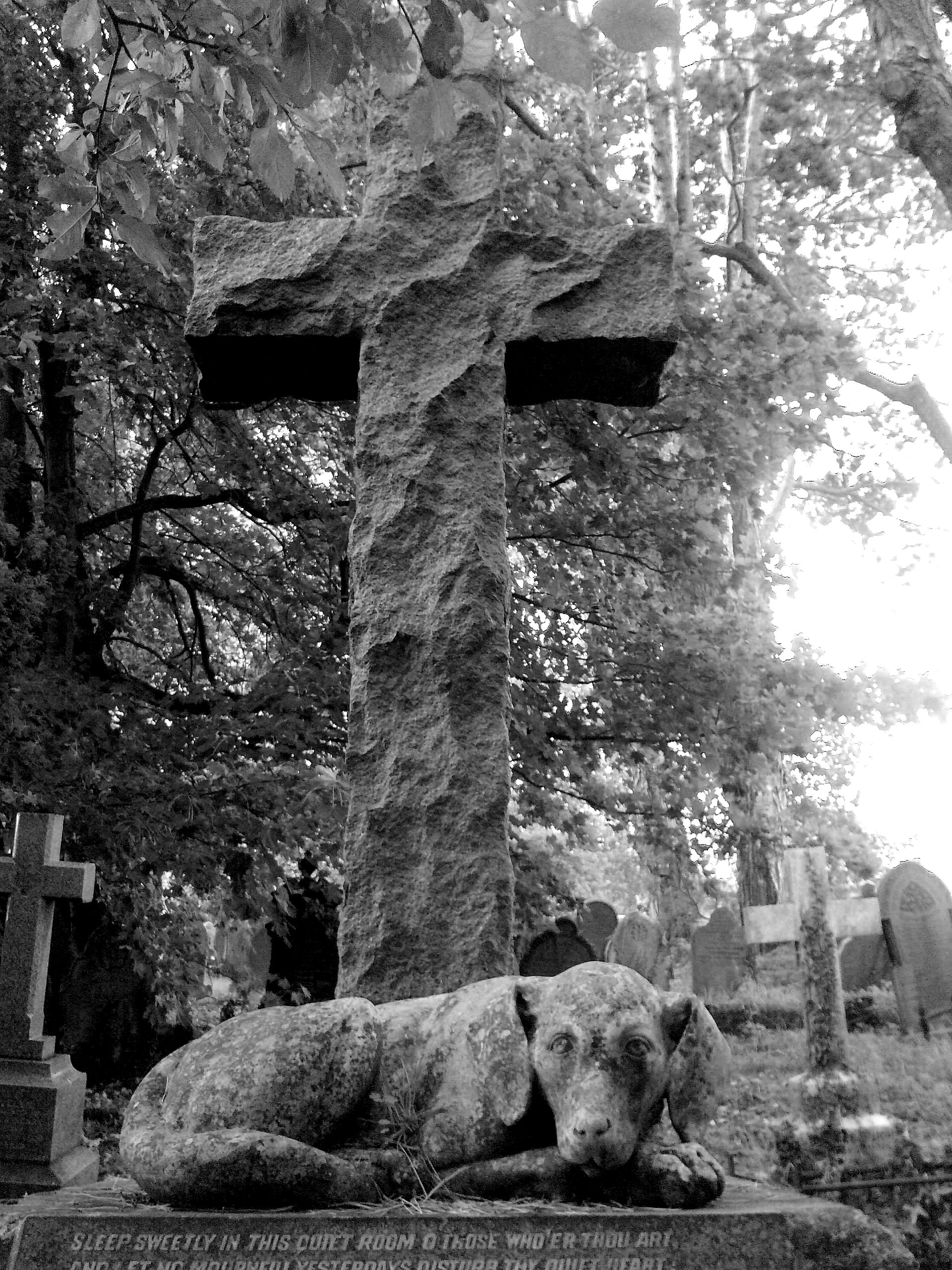
Col. Sandeman's dog

The church is built of Old Red Sandstone rubble. It comprises a nave with west tower, chancel, aisle and porch. The architectural historian John Newman, in his Gwent/Monmouthshire volume in the Buildings of Wales series, described the "broad and squat" tower as the church's most memorable feature. The interior contains some monuments of "unusually high quality" which are noted in the church's listing record for its Grade II* designation.

The churchyard contains the grave of Colonel Robert Preston Sandeman who died in 1932. On the headstone is an effigy of his favourite dog. The dog is reputed to have attended the grave every day after the colonel's death, and finally died there. The dog was interred with him and the effigy raised by Sandeman's widow. The churchyard is surrounded by a circle of ancient yew trees over 800 years old. Local tradition suggests that the Monmouthshire archers who supported Henry V at the Battle of Agincourt cut the yew for their Welsh bows from these trees. The king received strong military support from the archers of Gwent, who were famed for their skill with the Welsh bow. Gerald recorded that "the men of Gwent are more skilled with the bow and arrow than those who come from other parts of Wales". (Note: The most famous of Henry V's Welsh supporters was Dafydd Gam. Shakespeare's character Fluellen, who appears in Henry V and has been suggested as being modelled on Gam, reminds the king: "If your Majesty is remembered of it, the Welshmen did good service in a garden where leeks did grow, wearing leeks in their Monmouth caps, which your Majesty knows, to this hour is an honourable badge of the service, and I do believe, your Majesty takes no scorn to wear the leek upon Saint Tavy's day".)

== Sources ==
- Howell, Raymond (1988). A History of Gwent. Llandysul: Gomer Press. ISBN 978-0-863-83338-0. OCLC 19268836.
- Jones, Theophilus (1809). A history of the County of Brecknock Volume II Part II. George North.
- Mee, Arthur (1888). Llanelly Parish Church: Its history and records. Llanelly: South Wales Press.
- Newman, John (2000). Gwent/Monmouthshire. The Buildings of Wales. London: Penguin. ISBN 0-14-071053-1.
- Redmond, Gabriel O'C. (1898). "History and topography of the parish of Hook, Co. Wexford". Journal of the Waterford & South-East of Ireland Archaeological Society. IV.
