= Gilwern =

Village in Monmouthshire, Wales

Coordinates: 51.83°N 3.083°W

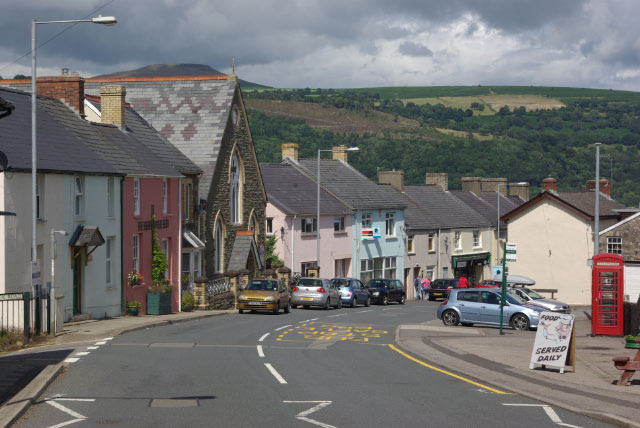
- A4077 in Gilwern

- Location within Monmouthshire
- Principal area: Monmouthshire
- Preserved county: Gwent
- Country: Wales
- Sovereign state: United Kingdom
- Police: Gwent
- Fire: South Wales
- Ambulance: Welsh
- UK Parliament: Monmouth

Gilwern is a village within the Brecon Beacons National Park in Monmouthshire, Wales. Historically in Brecknockshire, it extends to either side of the River Clydach on the south side of the Usk valley. Its position beside the Monmouthshire and Brecon Canal led to it being an important industrial centre at one time.

== Location ==
Gilwern is a village, historically in Breconshire, now in Monmouthshire about 3.5 miles (5.6 km) west of Abergavenny, close to where the A40 trunk road and the A465 Heads of the Valleys road meet. The River Usk and the Monmouthshire and Brecon Canal are close to the village.

The name of the village translates from the Welsh Y Gilwern (from cil-gwern) as "the recess (or bend) of the alders", probably a reference to its position at the point where the Clydach Gorge opens out into the Usk Valley and the River Clydach flows into a sharp bend in the River Usk. Gilwern Hill lies to the south of the village. It is partly tree-clad and has a mast on top.

The village is within the Llanelly parish ward of Monmouthshire County Council. The church of Llanelly, dedicated to St Elli, is on the hillside above the village, and parts date back to the 12th century.

== Industrial history and attractions ==
The local area has a history of iron and lime production. The Monmouthshire and Brecon Canal, which has a wharf at Gilwern, was built to transport coal, limestone and iron products from the surrounding area using a network of tramways and railroads. The Clydach Railroad and the Llam-march Tramroad both serviced the wharf with materials gathered and produced further up the Clydach Gorge. Both are still visible, the former being a road and the latter a footpath between Gilwern and Clydach. The canal crosses the River Clydach on the Gilwern Aqueduct, an embankment over 90 feet high, just next to Gilwern Wharf.

The former Navigation Inn and the Towpath Inn stand on either side of the canal just beyond the aqueduct.

=== World's Widest Pre-Cast Concrete-Spanned Bridge ===
Gilwern's precast-concrete arched bridge, on the A465, ('Head of Valleys Road'), between Gilwern and Brynmawr, is made of 70 individual units. The bridge structure is believed to be the widest-spanned, pre-cast concrete arched bridge in the world. The precast arch over the canal on the Heysham to M6 motorway Link Road was the previous record holder. Gilwrn's bridge has 70 pre-cast units, each weighing 27.5 tons. Its approximated measurements are a total length of 173.4 ft.; a height of 20.6 feet; and a span of 95.9 feet. Three local residents were the first to drive over the bridge when it was formally opened, replacing a former junction, at 14.30 hrs., on Thursday, January 26, 2018.

The Usk Valley Walk passes through Gilwern.

== Notable people ==
- Francis Jayne (1845–1921), academic and Bishop of Chester from 1889, born in Pant-y-beiliau
- James Edmunds (1882–1962), a Welsh trade unionist and politician.
- Mansel Thomas OBE (1909–1986), a Welsh composer and conductor, died in the town
