= Frere baronets =

Set index for Frere baronets

There have been two baronetcies created for persons with the surname Frere, one in the Baronetage of England and one in the Baronetage of the United Kingdom. Both creations are extinct.

- Frere baronets of Water Eaton (1620)
- Frere baronets of Wimbledon (1876)
