= Clywedog =

Clywedog may refer to:

- Afon Clywedog, a tributary of the River Severn at Llanidloes
- River Clywedog, a tributary of River Dee near Wrexham
- A tributary of the Afon Wnion in Gwynedd
- Clywedog Reservoir, a reservoir in Powys
- River Clywedog, Denbigh, a tributary of the River Clwyd
- Clywedog Brook, Powys, a tributary of the Wye.

== See also ==
- Clydach (disambiguation)
