= Llanelly =

Large parish in Monmouthshire, Wales

Coordinates: 51.82652°N 3.11579°W

Llanelly: Welsh: Llanelli
- Village and community
- Location within Monmouthshire
- Principal area: Monmouthshire
- Country: Wales
- Sovereign state: United Kingdom
- Police: Gwent
- Fire: South Wales
- Ambulance: Welsh
- List of places UK Wales Monmouthshire Map of the community

Llanelly (Welsh: Llanelli) is a village, community, and parish in the county of Monmouthshire, South East Wales. Until 1972 it existed in the historic county of Brecknockshire. The population of the community and ward at the 2011 census was 3,899. The Brecon Beacons National Park encompasses the parish and the surrounding area.

== Location ==
The community lies in the Clydach Gorge. It is bisected by the Heads of the Valleys Road, and lies between Brynmawr in the west and Abergavenny in the east.

== Settlements ==
The main settlements of the community are: Llanelly Hill, Blackrock, Clydach, Maesygwartha and Gilwern. Llanelly Hill is the north-west hilltop of the Clydach Gorge. It developed as a result of coal mining and limestone quarrying for the nearby ironworks which included the Clydach Ironworks and further west, the Ebbw Vale Ironworks.

Blackrock and Clydach North (which is also referred to as 'Cheltenham') were built up along the turnpike road that ran on the north side of the river between Govilon and Merthyr Tydfil. Clydach South developed on the south side of the river above the ironworks. It climbs the north-west slopes towards Llanelly Hill.

Gilwern is located at the mouth of the River Clydach, where it meets the River Usk. Maesygwartha lies between Clydach and Gilwern along one of the many tramroads in the gorge.

== History ==
The Church of St Elli dates from the 14th century or earlier. Noted Welsh historian Theophilus Jones (1809) documented his genealogy of the Maybery family in the context of its churchyard. He began by citing a gravestone there for 'John Mabery died April 22 1758, aged 63, Elizabeth, his widow, in 1782, aged 92.' He then commented:

'This family, who now write their name Maybery, settled first at Pipton, in the latter end of the seventeenth or the beginning of the eighteenth century, they were then and afterwards, until the present generation, in the iron trade; from Pipton, when the iron works ceased, the elder branch came to Brecon and continued in the same business, the late Mr Maybery left issue three sons, one (Thomas) in the law at Brecon, who is married and has several children; the second died in the East Indies, and the youngest (Charles) settled in America in an iron foundry: this Maybery, at Llanelly, was of this family.'

Several subsequent accounts about the Maybery family contrast with Jones' claim that it 'settled first at Pipton'. John Lloyd (1904) documented: 'The Mayberys came from Powick Forge in Worcestshire'. Later Lloyd (1906) documented that the Maybery family 'came from Powick Forge, on the Teme, in Worcestershire'. Minchinton (1961) documented that Thomas Maybery 'had previously been engaged in iron production at the Powick Forge in Worcestershire.' A genealogy of the Maybery family by Collins (2014) supports the previous claims. Finally, Lloyd (1906) and Redmonds, King and Hey (2011) documented that in 1753, Thomas Maybery acquired the Pipton forge for his son, John.

== Governance ==
In the 1890s the highest part of the parish, the southwest, was transferred into the new urban district of Brynmawr. Subsequently, from the local government reorganisation of 1974 until that of 1996, the community was part of the district of Blaenau Gwent. However, the electors overwhelmingly voted to be transferred out of the district.

The electoral ward of Llanelly Hill is coterminous with the Llanelly community and elects one county councillor to Monmouthshire County Council.

== Notable persons ==
- Sir Henry Bartle Frere (1815–1884), Governor-General of South Africa at the outbreak of the Anglo-Zulu War
- Thomas Phillips (1801–1867), Mayor of Newport during the Newport Rising

== See also ==
Llanelly, a former Welsh gold-mining town near Tarnagulla, Australia
