= Saint Elli =

6th-century Welsh saint

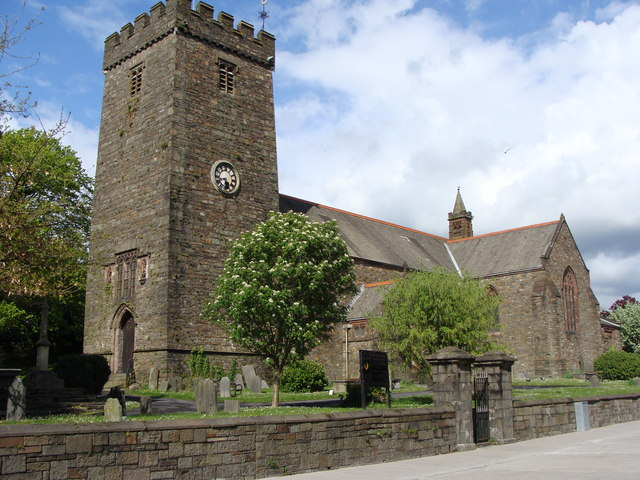
The Church of St Elli in Llanelli, built in the 13th century.

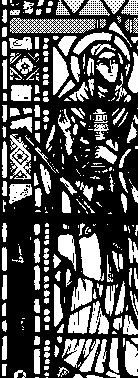
A drawing of the St Elli window at Church of St Gabriel, Brynmill, Swansea

Saint Elli was a 6th-century Welsh saint, or possibly two saints. Llanelli in Carmarthenshire and Llanelly in Monmouthshire are both named after Elli.

There are traditions about a male saint Elli and a female saint Elli, and there are depictions of a male and of a female saint.

According to one legend, Elli or Ellyw was a daughter or granddaughter of King Brychan. Elli founded a church on the banks of the River Lliedi, which attracted peasants who settled nearby. This community became the town of Llanelli in Carmarthenshire.

A different account is given in the 11th century Vita Cadoci (life of Cadoc), which says that Elli was the son of the Queen of the Islands of Grimbul, and the foster son of Saint Cadoc. When travelling in foreign lands, Cadoc landed on the islands of Grimbul. Grimbul's queen was barren, but after Cadoc interceded for her she bore a son, Elli, who she entrusted to the care of Cadoc. Cadoc took Elli to the clas (ecclesiastical settlement) at Llancarfan, where he was educated. The Vita Cadoci says that Elli succeeded Cadoc as Abbot of Llancarfan when Cadoc was preparing to leave for Benevento.

The hagiographer Sabine Baring-Gould (1834–1924) argued that Llanelieu Church in Powys was dedicated to the female St Ellyw or Elyw, but doubts that she was related to Brychan. He connects Llanelli and Llanelly with the male disciple of Cadoc.

Two Church in Wales churches are dedicated to St Elli, St Elli Church in Llanelli, Carmarthenshire, and St Elli's Church in Llanelly, Monmouthshire. Saint Elli is also venerated in both the Roman Catholic Church and the Eastern Orthodox Church.
