= Natural beech wood =

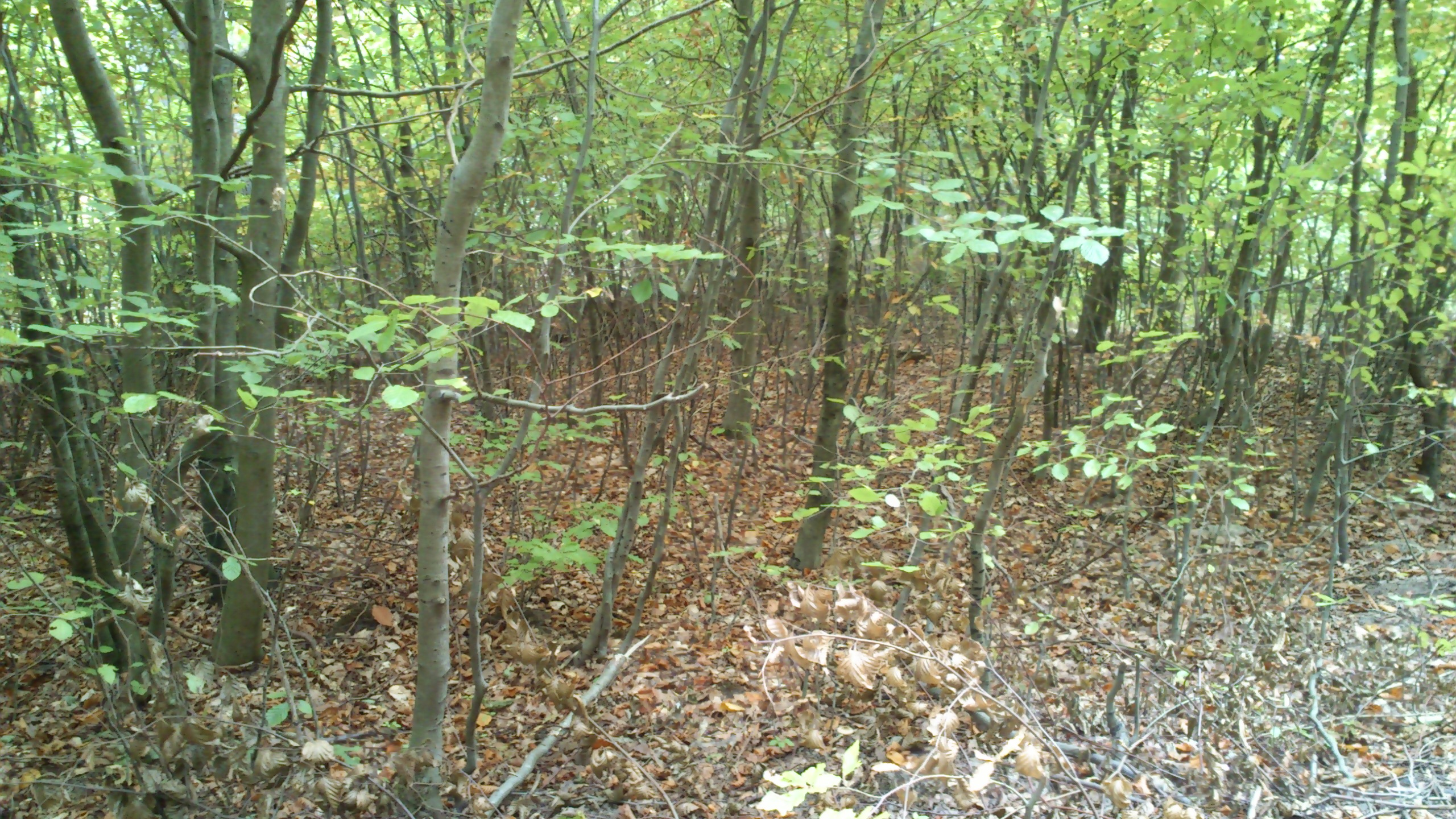
Example of a natural beech wood. The forest floor allows beech-seeds (mast) to take root and replenish the beech wood naturally.

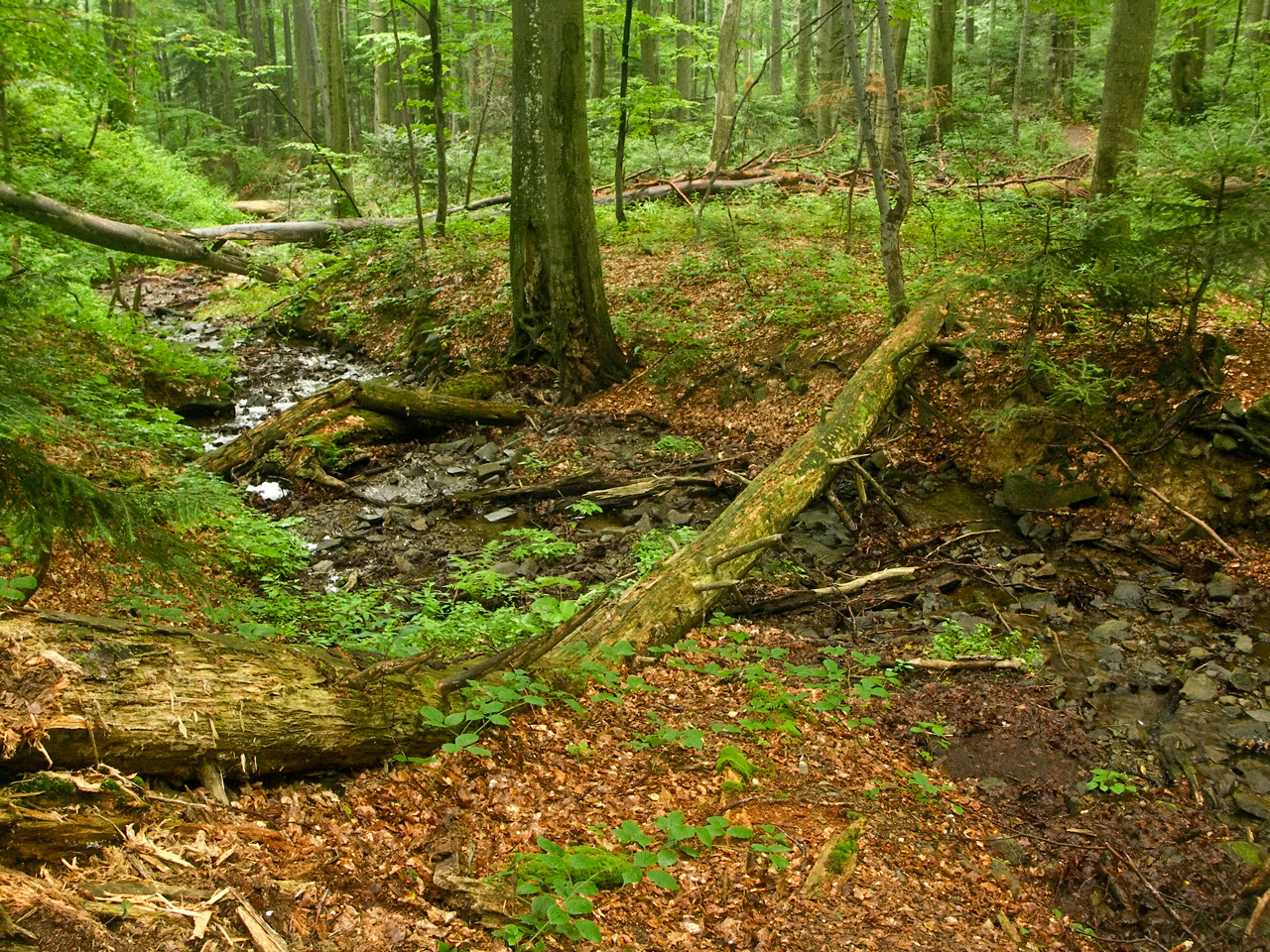
Natural forests has trees from all stages of the life cycle, including dead and decaying trees.

Natural beech wood is a beech wood, that is able to replenish and sustain itself on its own.

Beech is a valued timber, but most beech woods require human intervention to replace old trees, since the young trees are not able to survive at all, or at a rate that sustains the beech population over time. There can be various reasons for this condition. Heavy forest floor coverage of other plants in the spring, shadowing the young beech-shoots, is a common cause. Abundance of nutrient-rich soils will also be difficult to handle for beech woods in the long run.

A natural beech wood has beech trees of all ages, including fallen and dead trees. Other tree species might be mixed in, but not to a degree that threatens the dominant beech.

The term is also used for other tree species, such as 'natural oak wood', 'natural birch wood', etc..

== Natural beech wood forests ==
Among examples of natural beech wood forests are:

- Cwm Clydach National Nature Reserve in southeastern Wales
- Marselisborg Forests in Denmark
- Serrahn Hills in northeastern Germany
- The slopes of the Harz range in northern Germany
- Hainich National Park in central Germany
- Voděradské bučiny National Nature Reserve in the Czech Republic
- Stužica in Slovakia, one of Europes last primeval beech forests
- Carpathian Biosphere Reserve in southwestern Ukraine

== Threats ==
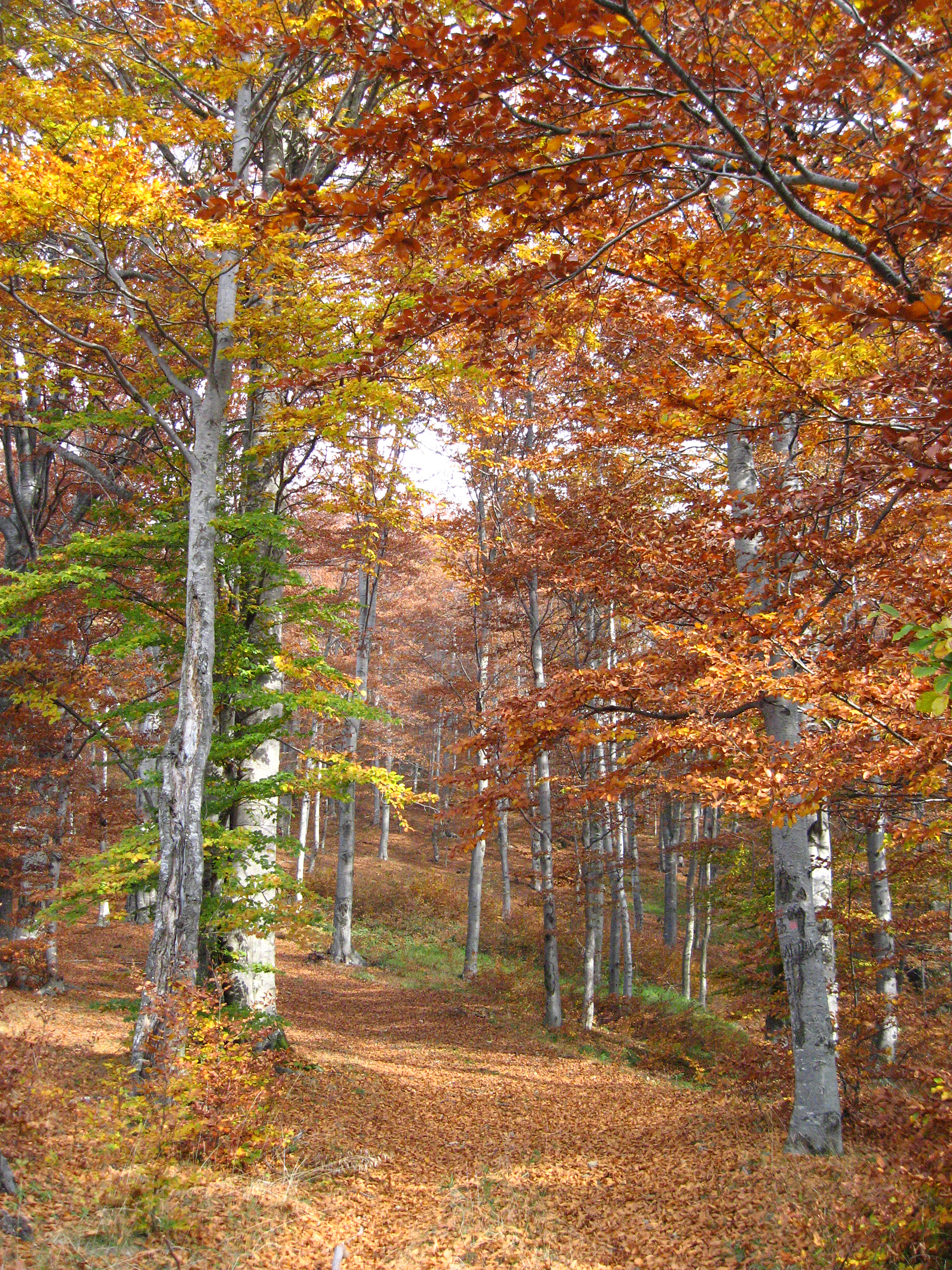
Beech wood in Serbia

Agricultural practices can often change the original soil-compositions so much, that the specific natural woodland type once associated with the local area, will change too. This change is almost irreversible. This condition has now affected most of Europe.

Local or global climate changes can also have a profound effect on what kind of natural woodland can grow and survive in a specific area.

European beech is usually more susceptible to climatic changes than soil-composition and the current global climate change are found to affect the geographical distribution of natural beech wood habitats.

== Misunderstandings and confusions ==
The term "natural" is often confusingly used as a synonym for "primeval". While primeval woodlands that still exist, are indeed natural, natural woodlands do not have to be primeval per se. Secondary or re-established woodlands can also be natural; it is just a matter of whether a given forest type is able to sustain and replace itself on its own – i.e. if the climatic and geological conditions for a given forest type are present or not. These conditions can be objectively determined, and do not depend on the "test of time" exclusively.

The term "semi-natural" is sometimes used to describe any natural woodland, that is not strictly primeval in origin.

== See also ==
- Silva Carbonaria, the 'Charcoal Forest'.
- Ancient and Primeval Beech Forests of the Carpathians and Other Regions of Europe
- Ancient woodland

== Sources ==
- Edward P. Mountford and Peter S. Savill; Natural regeneration of Beech forests in Europe - UK: Approaches, Problems, Recent advances and Recommendations Oxford Forestry Institute, March 2003, Nat-Man project (D22)
- Standovár & Kenderes; A review on natural stand dynamics in beechwoods of east central Europe Department of Plant Taxonomy and Ecology, Eötvös Loránd University (May 2003).
- Ancient semi-natural woodland Woodland Trust
- Policy Paper: Semi-natural Woodland The Society of Irish Foresters
- Ancient & semi natural Royal Forestry Society
- Ancient Semi-Natural Woodland (including PAWS and RNWAS) Habitat Definition Durham Biodiversity Action Plan
- Woodland JNCC
