= Clydach, Monmouthshire =

Village in Monmouthshire, Wales

Coordinates: 51.8086°N 3.1255°W

Clydach
- Location within Monmouthshire
- Population: <2000
- OS grid reference: SO225128
- Principal area: Monmouthshire
- Preserved county: Gwent
- Country: Wales
- Sovereign state: United Kingdom
- Post town: Abergavenny
- Postcode district: NP7
- Dialling code: 01873
- Police: Gwent
- Fire: South Wales
- Ambulance: Welsh
- UK Parliament: Monmouth
- Senedd Cymru – Welsh Parliament: Monmouth

Clydach is a village in Monmouthshire, Wales. Its nearest neighbours are the village of Gilwern and town of Abergavenny.

== Heads of the Valleys ==
It is split by the A465 road (the 'Heads of the Valleys') into North Clydach and South Clydach.

== Industrial heritage ==
Historically its main industry was based around the ironworks on the south side of the valley which have long since closed.

== Primary school closure ==
Clydach County primary school was closed in July 2006 by Monmouthshire County Council because of there were less than 30 pupils and none in years 5 and 6. The children now attend schools in Gilwern and Brynmawr and the school buildings are unused.

== Local walks ==
The area around the village is popular for hillwalking with many routes tracing the beauty of the nearby Clydach Gorge or Cwm Clydach, and the old trackbed of the Merthyr, Tredegar and Abergavenny Railway is a cycleway and walkway and the Monmouthshire and Brecon Canal can be walked or travelled by narrow boat.

There is a picnic site and caravan park alongside the River Clydach, easily reached from the A465 Heads of the Valleys road. The ironworks are some 300 metres away, across the river. The ironworks were built during the late 18th century and are a scheduled monument. There are also limeworks.

The area is within the Brecon Beacons National Park close to the Blaenavon Industrial Landscape, a World Heritage Site, and not far from Big Pit National Coal Museum. Clydach Gorge or Cwm Clydach has been designated a SSSI.

== Notable people ==
- Sir Henry Bartle Edward Frere, 1st Baronet, (1815–1884), a British colonial administrator, was born at Clydach House the son of Edward Frere, manager of Clydach Ironworks.
