= Forgotten Landscapes Project =

The Forgotten Landscapes Project was established in 2008 as a partnership project funded by the Heritage Lottery Fund and the Welsh Government to further develop the Blaenavon area in southeast Wales for visitors. It centred on the Blaenavon Industrial Landscape World Heritage Site but extended to the nearby Clydach Gorge, encompassing a total area of over 70 square kilometres (27 sq mi).

Its stated aims included the protection of the area’s considerable industrial heritage, conservation of common land and heather moorland and access improvements. The project also provided additional educational material, information and interpretation on the area including a programme of walks and talks.

The project received £1,610,500 from the lottery fund, as part of a total £2.47 million fund for the heritage site, with remaining funding coming from the Welsh Assembly and Countryside Council for Wales.
