= Frere baronets of Wimbledon (1876) =

The Frere baronetcy, of Wimbledon in the County of Surrey, was created in the Baronetage of the United Kingdom on 24 May 1876 for the colonial administrator Sir Henry Bartle Frere. The 1st Baronet was the grandson of John Frere, the great-nephew of Ellenor Fenn and the nephew of John Hookham Frere.

The title became extinct on the death of the 2nd Baronet in 1933.

== Frere baronets, of Wimbledon (1876) ==
- Sir Henry Bartle Edward Frere, 1st Baronet (1815–1884)
- Sir Bartle Compton Arthur Frere, 2nd Baronet (1854–1933)

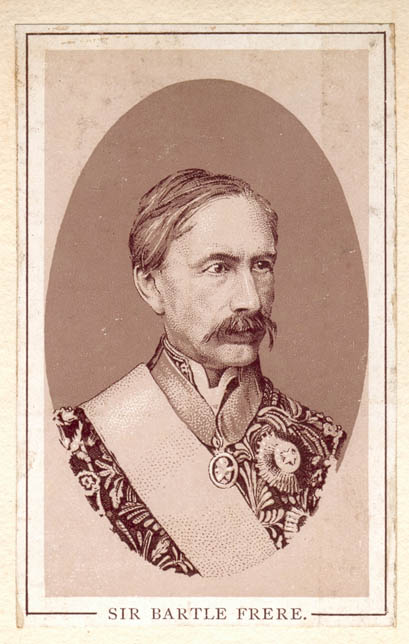
Sir Henry Bartle Frere, Bt, in the 1880s

Coat of arms of Frere of Wimbledon
Crest Out of a ducal coronet or, an antelope's head argent. Escutcheon Or, two leopards' faces in pale gules between as many flaunches of the last. Motto Traditum ab antiquis servare; Frere ayme Frere

== Notes ==
Baronetage of the United Kingdom
Preceded by Cust baronets	Frere baronets of Wimbledon; 24 May 1876	Succeeded by Temple baronets
