= Robert Keith Pringle =

British colonial administrator (1802–1897)

Commissioner for Sind
- In office 1847–1851
- Monarch: Queen Victoria
- Preceded by: Sir Charles James Napier
- Succeeded by: Sir Henry Bartle Frere

Personal details
- Born: 12 March 1802
- Died: 12 January 1897 (aged 94)

Robert Keith Pringle (12 March 1802 – 12 January 1897) was a Scottish civil servant in the Bombay Presidency.

Pringle was educated at the old High School in Edinburgh.

He was one of 11 children — five sons and six daughters — born to Alexander Pringle of Whytbank and Mary, daughter of Sir Alexander Dick, 3rd Baronet of Prestonfield.

== Sind ==
He was appointed the first Chief Commissioner of Sind in 1847. A position he held until 1851.

Government offices
Preceded by New Office	Commissioner in Sind; 1847–1851	Succeeded by Henry Bartle Frere
