= Louňovice =

- Municipality
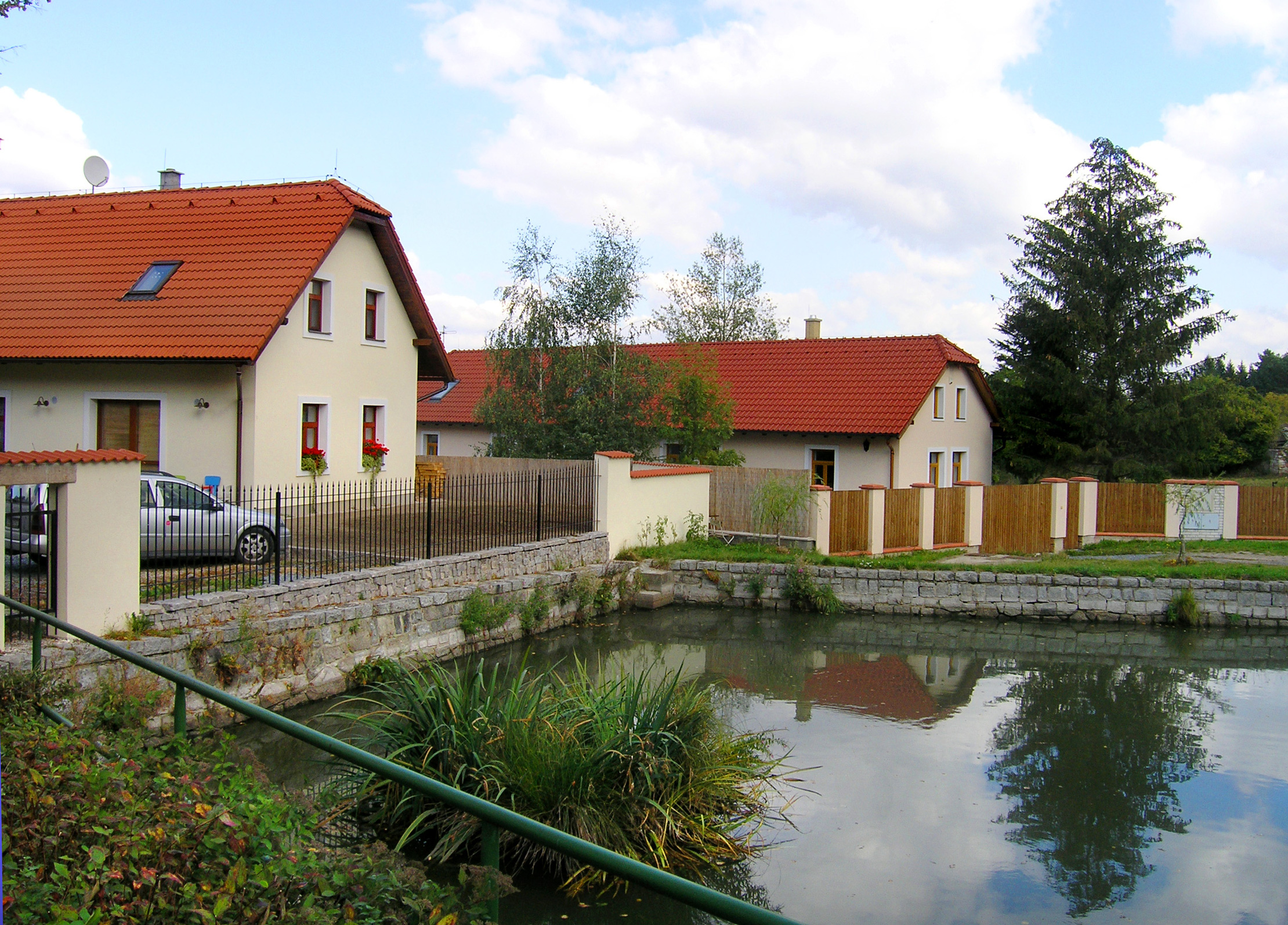
- Lower common

- Flag Coat of arms

- Location in the Czech Republic
- Coordinates: 49°58′56″N 14°45′43″E
- Country: Czech Republic
- Region: Central Bohemian
- District: Prague-East
- First mentioned: 1407

Area
  - Total: 4.43 km^{2} (1.71 sq mi)
- Elevation: 437 m (1,434 ft)

Population (2026-01-01)
  - Total: 1,296
  - Density: 293/km^{2} (758/sq mi)
- Time zone: UTC+1 (CET)
  - Summer (DST): UTC+2 (CEST)
- Postal code: 251 62
- Website: www.lounovice.cz

Louňovice is a municipality and village in Prague-East District in the Central Bohemian Region of the Czech Republic. It has about 1,300 inhabitants.

== Etymology ==
The name is derived from the personal name Louň, meaning "the village of Louň's people". In the oldest documents, the personal name was written as Lúň and the name of the village as Lúňovice.

== Geography ==
Louňovice is located about 19 kilometres (12 mi) east of Prague. It lies in the Benešov Uplands. The highest point is at 498 m (1,634 ft) above sea level. The stream Jevanský potok flows through the municipality and supplies two fishponds there, called Louňovák and Pařez. A small part of the Voděradské bučiny National Nature Reserve extends into the municipality in the south.

== History ==
The first written mention of Louňovice is from 1407. According to archaeological research, a settlement existed here as early as the first half of the 13th century.

== Demographics ==
Historical population

Year	Pop.	±%
1869	205	—
1880	246	+20.0%
1890	229	−6.9%
1900	227	−0.9%
1910	266	+17.2%

Year	Pop.	±%
1921	317	+19.2%
1930	337	+6.3%
1950	379	+12.5%
1961	519	+36.9%
1970	450	−13.3%

Year	Pop.	±%
1980	408	−9.3%
1991	376	−7.8%
2001	389	+3.5%
2011	950	+144.2%
2021	1,242	+30.7%

Source: Censuses

== Transport ==
The I/2 road from Prague to Kutná Hora and Pardubice passes through the municipality.

== Sights ==
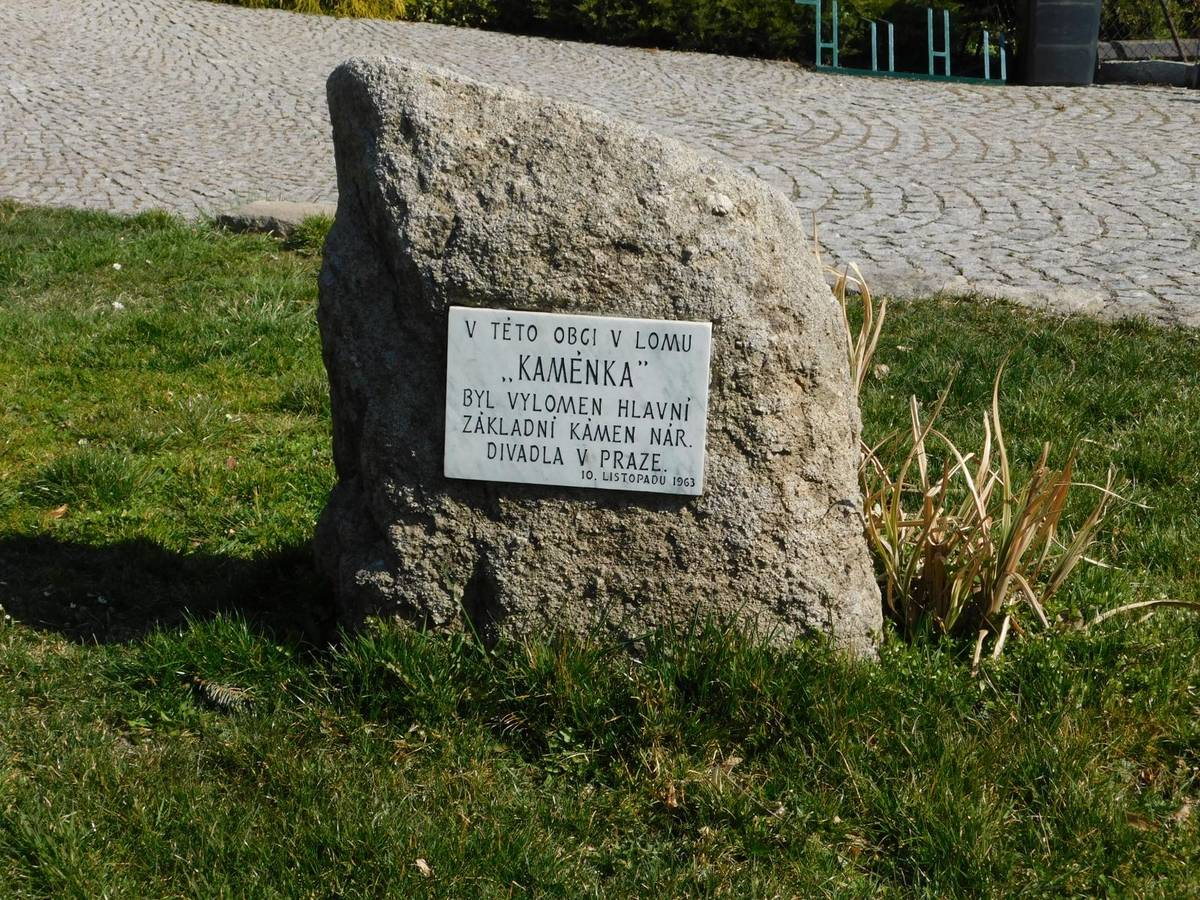
Memorial to the cornerstone of the National Theatre

There are no protected cultural monuments in the municipality.

A tourist destination is the small open-air museum Kamenický skanzen. The museum documents the historical connection of Louňovice and the surrounding villages with granite mining and presents the craft of stonemasonry and granite products. The cornerstone of the National Theatre in Prague comes from Louňovice, which commemorates a small monument.
