= Clydach House, Llanelly =

Clydach House
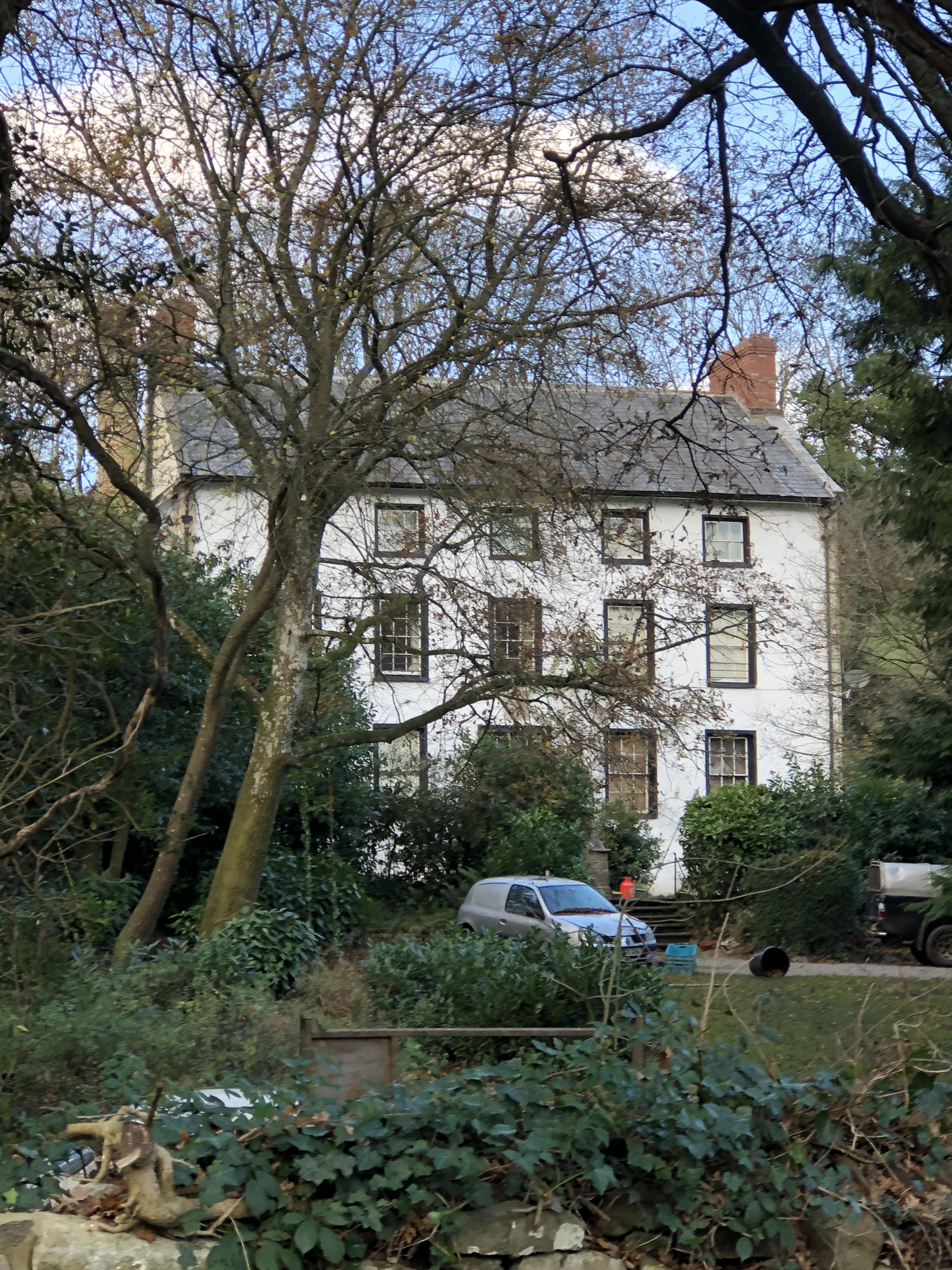
- "a remarkably well-preserved ironworks manager’s house"

- Location within Monmouthshire
- 51.8184°N 3.1137°W
- Type: House
- Location: Llanelly, Monmouthshire

History
- Built: 1693

Site notes
- Governing body: Privately owned

Listed Building – Grade II*
- Official name: Clydach House
- Designated: 19 July 1963
- Reference no.: 6667

Clydach House, Llanelly, Monmouthshire is a house dating from 1693. Constructed as the home for the manager of an ironworks in the nearby Clydach Gorge, it remains a private residence and is a Grade II* listed building.

== History ==
Clydach Gorge became an important centre for ironworking in the 17th century. Clydach House was built in 1693 for Francis Lewis, manager of the Llanelly Furnace. Lewis's arms are above the front door, together with the date of 1693. Sir Bartle Frere, colonial administrator and son of the manager of the Clydach Ironworks, was born at the house in 1815.

== Architecture and description ==
The architectural historian John Newman describes Clydach as a "symmetrical, double-pile house". It is of three storeys, constructed of white rendered stone. The building has original casement windows and a contemporary internal staircase. The Glamorgan-Gwent Archaeological Trust describes it as a "gentry house", indicating its size and relative sophistication. It has been described as being "in the Tudor style. (Note: This source incorrectly gives the date of construction as 1603.) Clydach is a Grade II* listed building, its listing record describing it as "a remarkably well-preserved ironworks manager’s house".
