= Temple baronets of The Nash (1876) =

Temple baronets
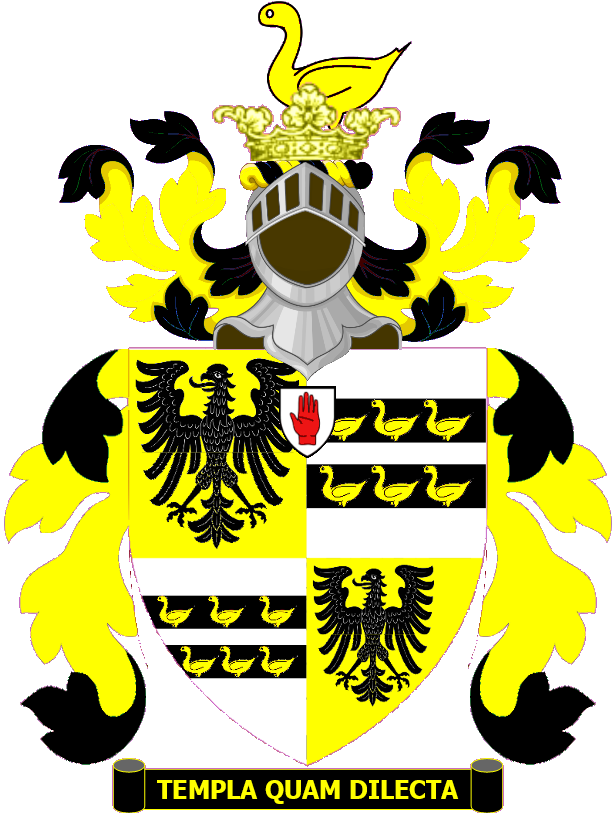
- Coat of arms of the Temple baronets of The Nash
- Creation date: 1876
- Status: extant
- Motto: Templa Quam Dilecta (How lovely are thy temples)
- Arms: Quarterly 1st & 4th Or an eagle displayed Sable; 2nd & 3rd Argent two bars Sable each charged with three martlets Or
- Crest: On a ducal coronet a martlet Or

The Temple baronetcy, of The Nash in Kempsey in the County of Worcester, was created in the Baronetage of the United Kingdom on 16 August 1876 for the politician and colonial administrator Richard Temple.

The family were descendants of William Dicken, who in 1740 married Henrietta, daughter and co-heir of the 5th Baronet of the 1611 creation. Their son assumed by Royal licence the surname of Temple in lieu of Dicken in 1796. His grandson was the 1st Baronet.

== Temple baronets, of The Nash (1876) ==
- Sir Richard Temple, 1st Baronet (1826–1902)
- Sir Richard Carnac Temple, 2nd Baronet (1850–1931). He married in 1880, Agnes, daughter of Maj.-Gen. George Archimedes Searle.
- Sir Richard Durand Temple, 3rd Baronet (1880–1962) He married firstly, in 1912, Katherine Marjorie, daughter of Frederic de la Fontaine Williams, of Rydes Hill House; and secondly, in 1939, Marie Wanda, daughter of John Frederick Christian Henderson, and was succeeded by his son by his first wife.
- Sir Richard Anthony Purbeck Temple, 4th Baronet (1913–2007). He married in 1936 (divorced 1946), Lucy Geils, daughter of Alain Joly de Lotbinière, 8th Seigneur de Lotbinière, of Pointe Platon, Quebec, Canada; and secondly, in 1950, Jean, daughter of James Thompson Finnie, and was succeeded by his elder son by his first wife.
- Sir Richard Chartier Carnac Temple, 5th Baronet (born 1937) He married in 1964, Emma Rose, daughter of Maj.-Gen. Sir Robert Laycock by his wife Lady Clare Angela Louise, daughter of William Dudley Ward, M.P.; and has three daughters.

The heir presumptive is the present holder's nephew Nicholas Christopher Lee Temple (born 1986).

== Notes ==
Baronetage of the United Kingdom
Preceded by Frere baronets	Temple baronets of The Nash; 16 August 1876	Succeeded by Falshaw baronets
