= Voděradské bučiny =

Nature reserve in the Czech Republic

- IUCN category IV (habitat/species management area)
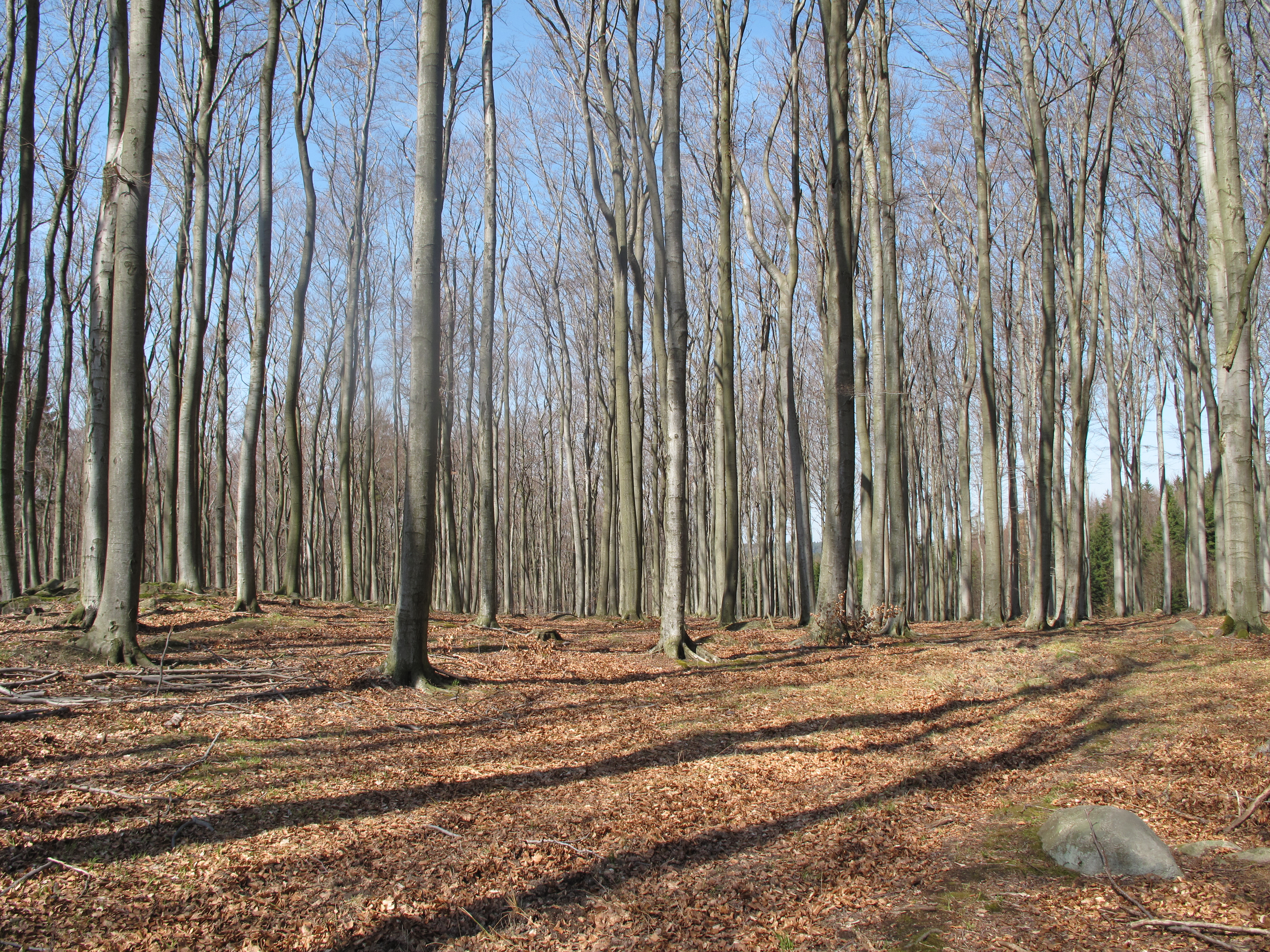
- Beech forest in the nature reserve

- Location within Czech Republic
- Location: Central Bohemian Region, Czech Republic
- Coordinates: 49°57′46″N 14°47′29″E
- Area: 683.873 ha (1,689.89 acres)
- Max. elevation: 501 m (1,644 ft)
- Min. elevation: 345 m (1,132 ft)
- Established: 5 April 1955
- Operator: AOPK ČR

Voděradské bučiny ('Voděrady Beechwood') is a natural beech wood in Prague-East District in the Central Bohemian Region of the Czech Republic, protected as a national nature reserve.

== Geography ==
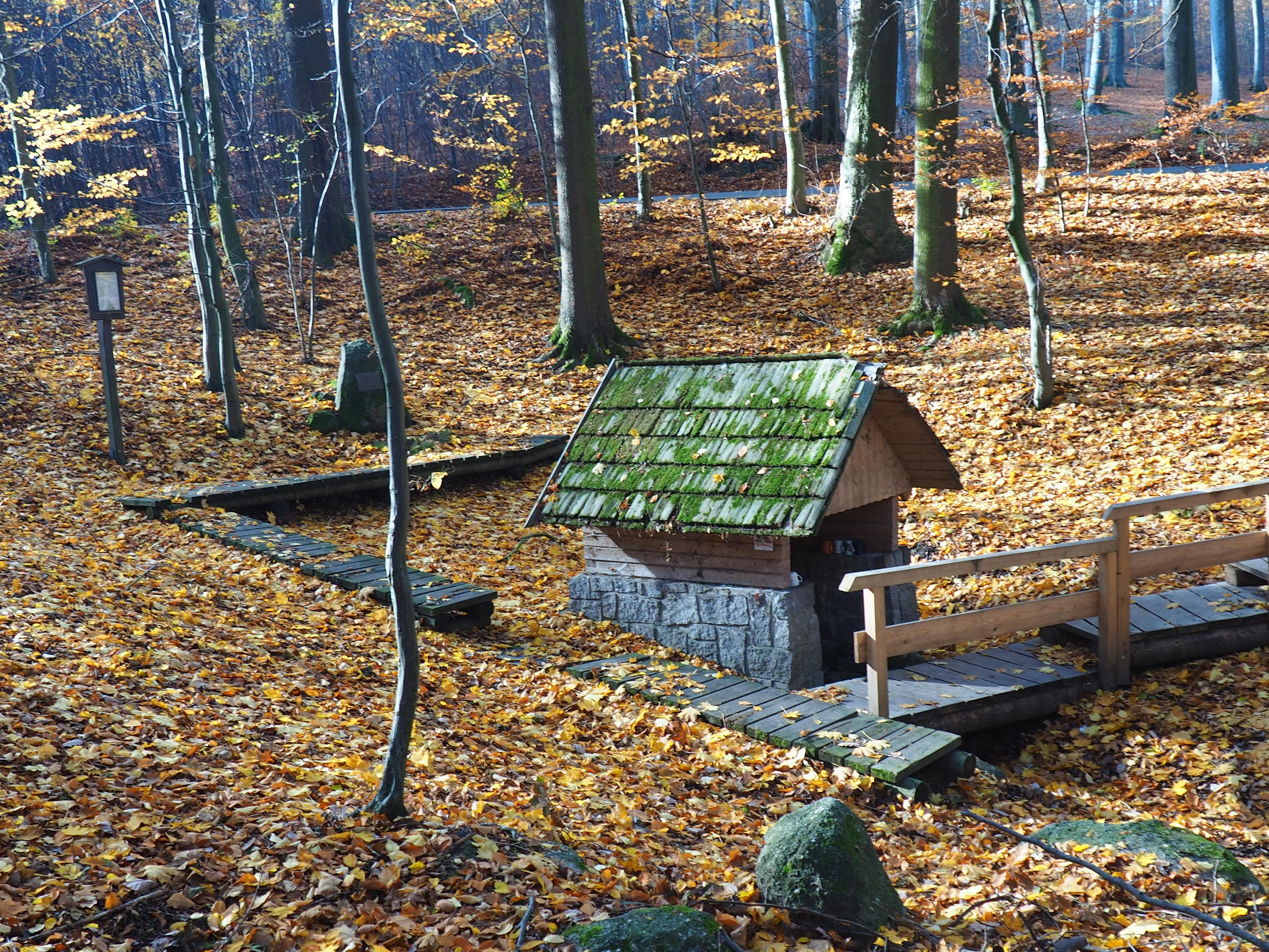
Lenhart's Well and Memorial to Václav Eliáš Lenhart, founder of Czech forestry science

Voděradské bučiny is located in the Benešov Uplands, about 25 kilometres (16 mi) southeast of Prague. It is mostly located in the municipal territory of Černé Voděrady (hence the name), but it also extends into the territories of Louňovice and Vyžlovka. It is a natural beech wood, protected as a national nature reserve since 1955. Initially the nature reserve had an area of 653 ha (1,610 acres), but today it has an area of 683.9 ha (1,690 acres). The brook Jevanský potok flows through the southern part of the nature reserve. In the north, the nature reserve borders several fishponds, which are supplied by the Jevanský potok.

The southeastern half of the forest is also protected as a special area of conservation with an area of 317.4 ha (784 acres).

== Flora ==
Voděradské bučiny is a vast beech forest, with an admixture of pedunculate oak and common hornbeam.

The nature reserve contains plants that do not grow anywhere else in Central Europe: Elaphocephala iocularis and Galerina pallida.

== Fauna ==
There is a large variety of birds, including many protected species: European honey buzzard, the Eurasian goshawk, the common raven, the Eurasian eagle-owl, the stock dove and the black woodpecker.

Common mammals in the area include the wild boar, the beech marten, the European badger and bats.

Thirty species of beetles from the IUCN Red List were found in the nature reserve. Voděradské bučiny is the only locality in the Czech Republic where Agapetus (Synagapetus) moselyi lives.

Brook lamprey lives in the brook Jevanský potok. During a 2008 study, 38 species of molluscs were found in the nature reserve.

== Geology and pedology ==
The forests are on relatively acidic soil. The bedrock is formed by granite. Geological phenomena from the Quaternary period can be found here.

== Tourism ==
An 8 km (5 mi) long educational trail runs through the nature reserve. Several other marked trails runs through the nature reserve. It is not allowed to move outside the marked trails.
