= Cwm Clydach RSPB Reserve =

RSPB nature reserve in Swansea, Wales

Coordinates: 51.719°N 3.883°W

Cwm Clydach is a nature reserve on the outskirts of Clydach, Swansea, Wales. It is run by the Royal Society for the Protection of Birds (RSPB).

It is ancient broadleaved woodland and is home to breeding pied flycatchers, redstarts, dippers and buzzards. The Lower Clydach River flows through the centre of the reserve.

== Walks & Trails ==
Public paths and trails are open from dawn to dusk. There are two main trails which begin at the main car park. The shortest, known as the Nixon trail is a 2.2 km circular walk which is suitable for pushchairs. The 4.7 km Trussler trail is rugged in parts. Both trails connect with longer distance footpaths leading off the reserve.
