= St Elli Church, Llanelli =

Church in Carmarthenshire, Wales

St Elli Church
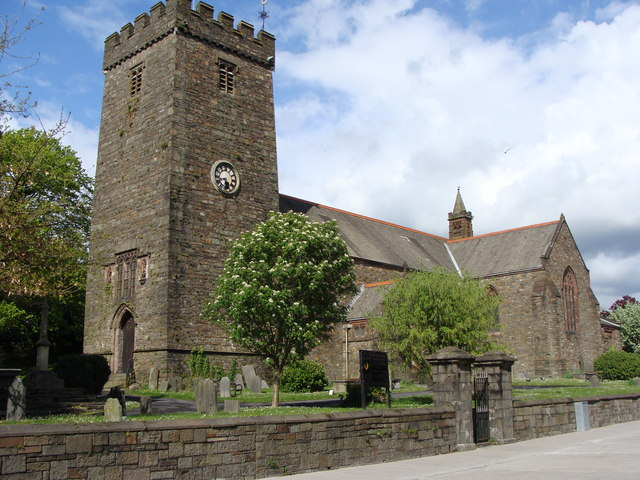
- St Elli Church
- 51.6837°N 4.1611°W
- Location: Bridge Street, Llanelli
- Country: Wales
- Denomination: Church in Wales
- Website: www.brolliedi.org.uk/st-elli-church/

History
- Founded: Medieval, possibly 15th century
- Dedication: Saint Elli

Architecture
- Heritage designation: Grade II*
- Designated: 30 November 1964
- Architectural type: Church

St Elli Church, also called St Ellyw's Church is an Anglican parish church in the town of Llanelli, Carmarthenshire, Wales, dedicated to Saint Elli. It was built in the medieval period, possibly in the 15th century, and is located in Bridge Street, opposite Llanelly House. It was designated a Grade II*-listed building on 30 November 1964.

== History ==
The church was a parish church in medieval times, being first mentioned in eleventh century documents. In the thirteenth century the living was in the gift of the Lord of Kidwelly, Patrick de Chatworth, but with his death the patronage passed to the Crown. In the late fourteenth century John of Gaunt was entitled to receive the tithes at the collegiate church of St Mary, Leicester. There were four subordinate chapels in the parish before the Protestant Reformation.

== The building ==
The church dates back to the medieval period, possibly the fifteenth century. The west tower is the oldest part of the building, the rest having been added by George Frederick Bodley of London in 1905–06. The church is built of rock-faced rubble stone with decorative red sandstone dressings, stone-coped gables, green slate roofs and terracotta ridge tiles. There is an octagonal chimney between the chancel roof and the nave roof, and there is a large porch at the south end. The tower has a corbelled parapet, a clock halfway up the south side and a square stairwell on the north side.

The church was designated a Grade II*-listed building on 30 November 1964, for being "of exceptional interest on account of the interior with [its] fittings and notable monuments". The Royal Commission on the Ancient and Historical Monuments of Wales curates the archaeological, architectural and historic records for this church. These include digital photographs and Cadw Historic Churches Project files.
