= Cwm Clydach National Nature Reserve =

Nature reserve in south Wales

Coordinates: 51.806°N 3.136°W

Cwm Clydach National Nature Reserve is a 24.8 hectares (61 acres) area of steeply sloping valley-side on Clydach Gorge, 2 miles (3.2 km) east of Brynmawr, southeast Wales. It is protected for its ancient semi-natural beech woods, designated by the Nature Conservancy Council (now managed by its successor authority Natural Resources Wales).

The reserve is a part of the Cwm Clydach site of special scientific interest (SSSI) and of the Cwm Clydach Woodlands/Coedydd Cwm Clydach special area of conservation (SAC).

There is public access to much of the reserve through a network of public footpaths, a section of the national cycleway and by public roads. Interpretive panels at access points to the reserve provide maps of the reserve and information.

== Flora ==
The dense foliage of the beech canopy results in a rather minimal ground flora but species like bird's nest orchid are found amongst the leaf litter. The high humidity of the more sheltered parts of the gorge encourage the growth of ferns, mosses and other lower plants including the lichen, Stricta sylvatica and the hay-scented buckler fern.

== Fauna ==
Woodland birds in the reserve include nuthatch and both the green woodpecker and greater spotted woodpecker. Birds of prey include sparrowhawk, kestrel and tawny owl.
