= Lower Clydach River =

River in south Wales

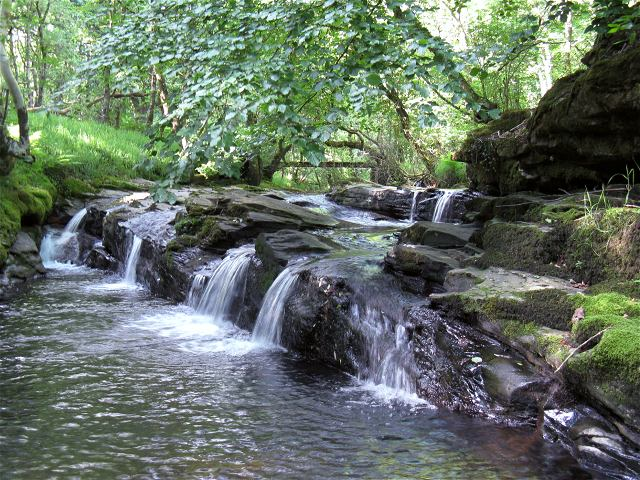
Cascades on the Lower Clydach

The Lower Clydach River is a river in South Wales which rises on the slopes of Mynydd y Betws west of Cwmgors and flows for around 10 km through Cwm Clydach to its confluence with the River Tawe at Clydach. It runs through the RSPB's Cwm Clydach Nature Reserve just to the north of Clydach. - 51.69581°N 3.8992°W.

Each of the rivers bearing the name 'Clydach' in South Wales is thought to derive from an earlier Celtic word 'klou' or 'kleu' together with the suffix '-ach' which is of Irish origin. The sense is of a 'strong-flowing', 'washing' or stony river.
