= Welsh bow =

Medieval weapon from Wales

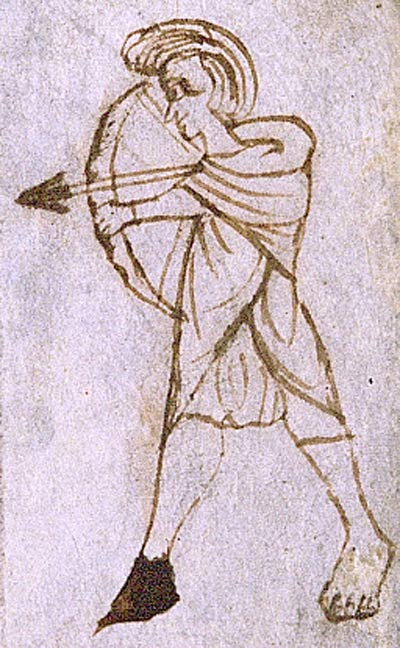
Illustration of Welsh bowman, 13th century.

The Welsh bow or Welsh longbow was a medieval weapon used by Welsh soldiers. They were documented by Gerald of Wales around 1188, who writes in his Itinerarium Kambriae of the bows used by the Welsh men of Gwent: "They are made neither of horn, ash nor yew, but of elm. " He reported that the bows of Gwent were "stiff and strong, not only for missiles to be shot from a distance, but also for sustaining heavy blows in close quarters." He gave examples of the performance of these bows:

[I]n the war against the Welsh, one of the men of arms was struck by an arrow shot at him by a Welshman. It went right through his thigh, high up, where it was protected inside and outside the leg by his iron chausses, and then through the skirt of his leather tunic; next it penetrated that part of the saddle which is called the alva or seat; and finally it lodged in his horse, driving so deep that it killed the animal.

The powerful Welsh bow may have later been one influence that inspired the creation of the English longbow.
