= Frere baronets of Water Eaton (1620) =

The Frere baronetcy, of Water Eaton in the County of Oxford, was created in the Baronetage of England on 22 July 1620 for Edward Frere, or Fryer. The title became extinct on his death in 1629.

== Background ==
According to a pedigree published in 1893 by Stapleton, Edward Frere was the son of William Frere (died 1612) and grandson of Edward Frere (died 1565), both of whom served as Member of Parliament (MP) for Oxford. Cokayne calls his mother Mary Bamfield, whereas Stapleton has Marie Bamfield; but calls his father Walter Frere, rather than William, who for Cokayne was a Justice of the Peace (JP) from 1574. The History of Parliament makes William the MP a JP from c.1591. Both Stapleton and Cokayne give the marriage of Edward Frere to Mary Stafford (died 1623), but Stapleton gives an earlier marriage, to the widow Margaret Taverner.

Cokayne further identifies this Edward Frere with Edward Fryer or Friar who entered Trinity College, Oxford in 1574 at age ten, mentioned in Alumni Oxonienses, so giving a birth date c.1564. Edward Frere, son of the MP, succeeded his father in 1612 aged around 44, for a date of birth c.1572.

William Frere was a property owner at Water Eaton and "one of the targets of the 1596 Oxfordshire rising" for his use there of enclosures. He also served as High Sheriff of Oxfordshire. This was in 1595, by which time Frere "one of the wealthiest members of Oxford's oligarchy", was a successful climber in social status. Three years later a Star Chamber case against Frere's enclosures was still active.

== Frere baronets, of Water Eaton (1620) ==
- Sir Edward Frere, 1st Baronet (c. 1564–1629)

Coat of arms of Frere of Water Eaton
Crest On a Wreath two naked Arms bent, supporting a garb or, banded or and gules proper Escutcheon Gules, a wheat ear erect, leaves or, between two flaunches of the same, each charged with a wheat ear slipt or, leaves gules.
