= Henry Bartle Frere =

British colonial Welsh administrator (1815–1884)

The Right Honourable Sir Henry Bartle Frere Bt GCB GCSI PC
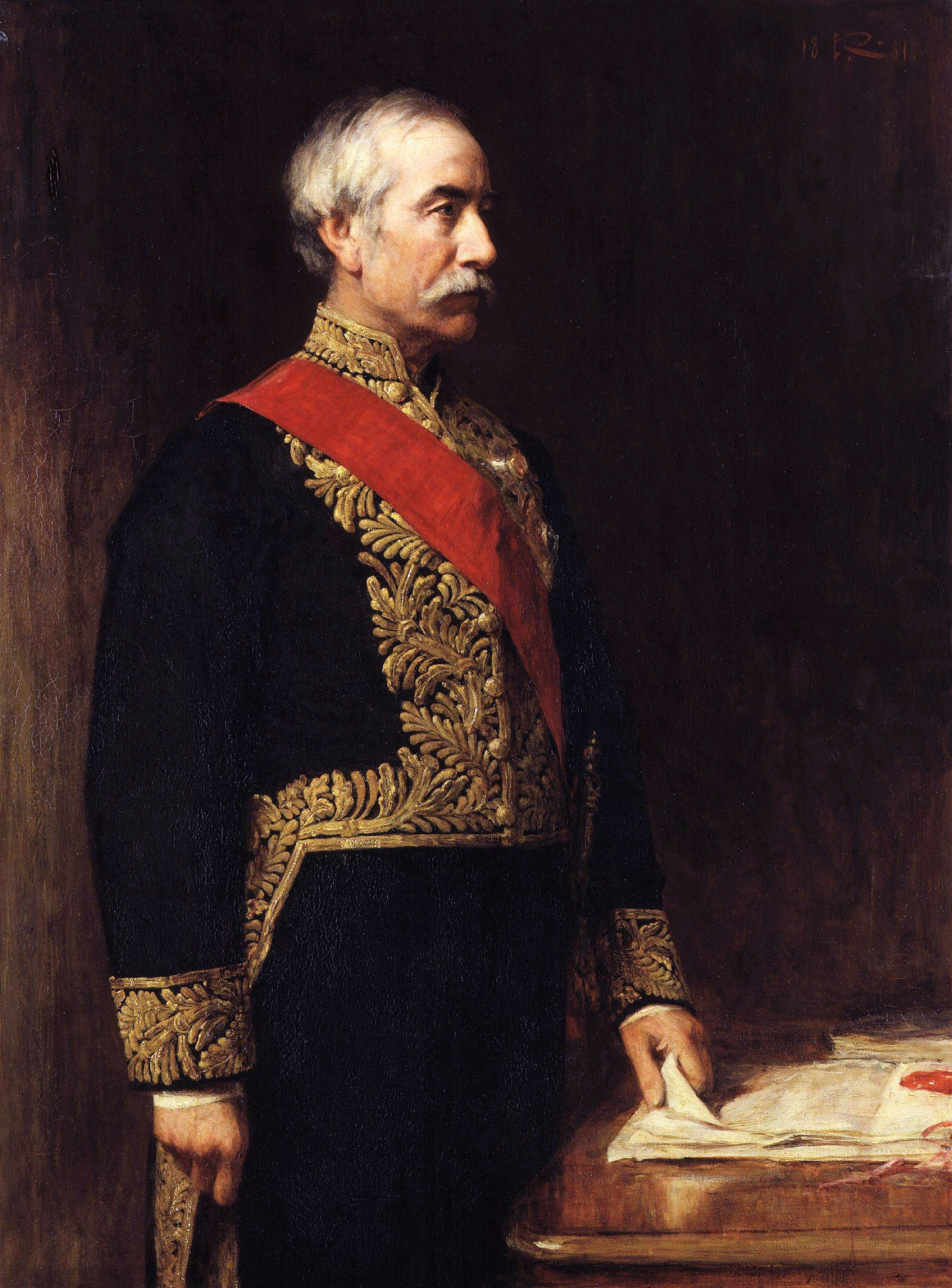
- 1881 portrait by George Reid

High Commissioner for Southern Africa
- In office 1877–1880
- Monarch: Victoria
- Preceded by: Sir Henry Barkly
- Succeeded by: Henry Hugh Clifford (acting)

Governor of Bombay
- In office 1862–1867
- Monarch: Victoria
- Preceded by: Sir George Russell Clerk
- Succeeded by: William Vesey-FitzGerald

Commissioner of Sind
- In office 1851–1859
- Monarch: Victoria
- Preceded by: Richard Keith Pringle
- Succeeded by: Jonathan Duncan Inverarity

Personal details
- Born: 29 March 1815 Clydach, Monmouthshire, Wales
- Died: 29 May 1884 (aged 69) Wimbledon, London, England
- Citizenship: British
- Education: East India Company College

Sir Henry Bartle Edward Frere, 1st Baronet, GCB, GCSI, PC (/ˈbɑɹtəl frɛə/ BAR-təl FREHR; 29 March 1815 – 29 May 1884) was a British colonial administrator. He had a successful career in India, rising to become Governor of Bombay (1862–1867). However, as High Commissioner for Southern Africa (1877–1880), he implemented a set of policies which attempted to impose a British confederation on the region and which led to the overthrow of the Cape Colony's first elected government in 1878 and to a string of regional wars, culminating in the invasion of Zululand (1879) and the First Boer War (1880–1881). The British Prime Minister, Gladstone, recalled Frere to London to face charges of misconduct; Whitehall officially censured Frere for acting recklessly.

== Early life ==
Frere was born at Clydach House, Clydach, Monmouthshire, the son of Edward Frere, manager of Clydach Ironworks, and Mary Ann Green. His elder sister, Mary Anne Frere, was born c. 1802 in Clydach, and his younger sister, Frances Anne Frere, was born c. 1819 in Clydach. He was the grandson of John Frere and a nephew of John Hookham Frere; William Frere; Bartholomew Frere; James Hatley Frere; and Temple Frere – canon of Westminster Abbey. He was educated at the East India Company College, the precursor of Haileybury and Imperial Service College.

== Family life ==
On 10 October 1844, he married Catherine Arthur, daughter of Sir George Arthur, 1st Baronet, who was the Governor of Bombay and to whom he had been appointed private secretary two years earlier.

Their five children were: Mary Eliza Isabella Frere (born 1845 at Bitton, Gloucestershire); Catherine Frances Frere (born 1849 in the East Indies, who edited The Cookery Book of Lady Clark of Tillypronie in 1909); Georgina Hamilton Chichester Frere (born c. 1850 in the East Indies); Bartle Compton Arthur Frere (born c. 1855 in Paddington, Middlesex); and Eliza Frederica Jane Frere (born c. 1857 in Wimbledon,

== India ==
After leaving the East India Company College Frere was appointed a writer in the Bombay Presidency civil service in 1834. Having passed his language examination, he was appointed assistant collector at Poona in 1835, and in 1842 he was chosen as private secretary to Sir George Arthur, Governor of Bombay. Two years later he became a political resident at the court of Raja Shahaji of Satara; on the raja's death in 1848 he administered the province both before and after its formal annexation in 1849.

=== Commissioner in Sindh ===
In 1850 he was appointed chief commissioner of Sindh. In 1851 he reformed the Scinde District postal system on the model of the British postal service, to provide better service with Rowland Hill's "low and uniform" postal rates. This system became the basis for India's postal system, designed to provide public service. In 1857, he sent detachments to Multan and to Sir John Lawrence in the Punjab in order to secure those locations during the Indian Mutiny. These services were fully recognized, as he received the thanks of both houses of Parliament and was made a Knight Commander of the Order of the Bath (KCB).

As the chief commissioner of Sindh, in 1851, Frere issued a decree making it compulsory to use Sindhi language in place of Persian in Sindh. The officers of Sindh were ordered to learn Sindhi compulsorily to enable them to carry on day-to-day work efficiently. A committee was constituted (1853) under Asst. Commissioner & Chief of Education Department, with an equal number of Hindu and Muslim members, which unanimously decided on the use of Persio-Arabic Sindhi script with slight modifications. Frere not only gave Sindhi language one script but he even published different Sindhi books related to various streams of the literature, which encouraged impetus to Sindhi writers to move quickly with literacy.

=== Governor of Bombay ===
He became a member of the Viceroy's Council in 1859, and in 1862 was appointed Governor of Bombay, where he continued his policy of municipal improvements, establishing the Deccan College at Pune, as well as a college for instructing Indians in civil engineering. A 5-mile road in Kirkee Cantonment was named after him circa 1865. His order to pull down the ramparts of the old Bombay Fort allowed the city to grow, and the Flora Fountain was commissioned in his honour. During Frere's administration his daughter, Mary Frere, collected Old Deccan Days (1868), the first English-language field-collected book of Indian folklore.

In 1867 he returned to England, where he was made GCSI, and given honorary degrees from Oxford and Cambridge;. He was also appointed a member of the Council of India.

== Africa ==
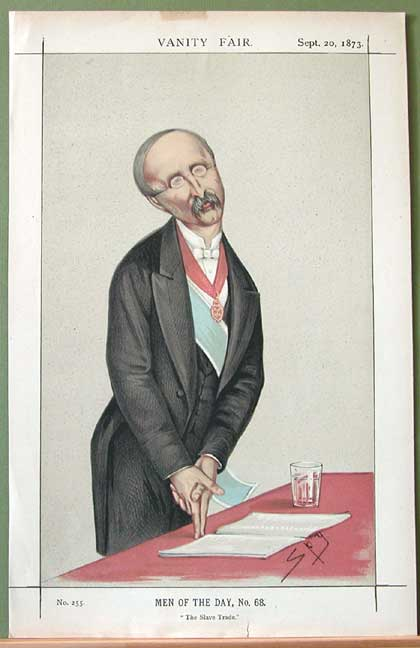
Henry Bartle Frere, by 'Spy' in Vanity Fair, 1873

In 1872, the Foreign Office sent him to Zanzibar to negotiate a treaty with the sultan, Barghash bin Said, for the suppression of the slave traffic, the Frere Treaty. On 4 August 1873 he was sworn in as a member of Privy Council at Osborne House on the Isle of Wight. In 1875, he accompanied the Prince of Wales to Egypt and India, with such success that Lord Beaconsfield asked him to choose between being made a baronet or a Knight Grand Cross of the Bath. He chose the former, but Queen Victoria bestowed both honours upon him.

== High Commissioner for Southern Africa ==
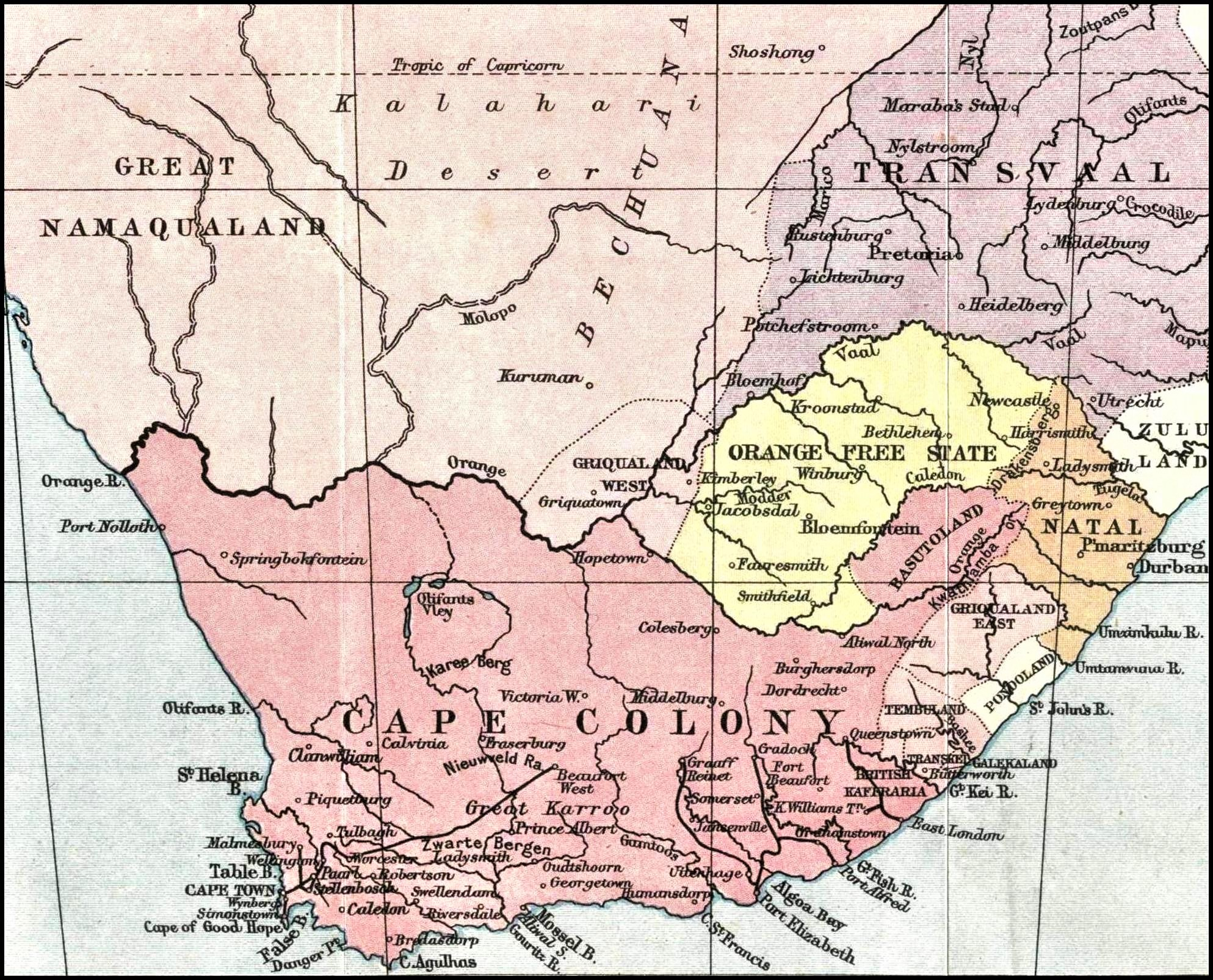
Southern Africa in 1878, on the eve of the confederation wars, Cape Colony Transvaal Orange Free State

In 1877, Frere was made High Commissioner for Southern Africa and governor of the Cape Colony by the London-based Secretary of State for the Colonies Henry Howard Molyneux Herbert, 4th Earl of Carnarvon, who continued to support the imposition of the unpopular system of confederation upon the southern Africa region. Frere accepted the position, on a salary double that of his predecessor, and with the understanding that successful implementation of confederation would result in his being appointed the first British Governor-General of a federated southern African dominion.

=== Attempt to federate Southern Africa ===
The idea of melding the states of southern Africa into a British Confederation was not new. It was seen as an easy way of uniting the region under British control, while preventing any future attempt among the remaining independent African states to unite against British rule. However an earlier plan by Sir George Grey for a federation of all the various colonies in South Africa had been rejected by the home authorities in 1858, as not being viable.

Through Frere's elevation, Lord Carnarvon sought another attempt at implementing the ill-fated and locally unsupported confederation scheme, that was met with resistance by all the local groups involved. South Africans resented the perceived high-handed manner in which it was being imposed from London with little accommodation and knowledge of, or concern for, local conditions and politics. Cape Prime Minister, John Charles Molteno, advised that under current conditions confederation was ill-suited to and badly timed for Southern Africa. It would lead to a lop-sided confederation with resulting instability and resentment. He advised that full union status was a better model, but only at a later date and once it was economically viable.

Timing was a key factor in the ensuing events, as the different states of southern Africa were at the time still suspicious and resentful after the last bout of British imperial expansion. The Afrikaners resented the recent annexation of the Transvaal, did not support confederation, and would successfully rebel in the First Boer War. The various Black South African states were also suspicious of this new effort towards British expansion. The ill-advised policies of both Frere and his local ally, John Gordon Sprigg, ended up causing a string of wars across Southern Africa, culminating in the disastrous Anglo-Zulu and Boer Wars.

=== Resistance from the Cape and the Xhosa ===
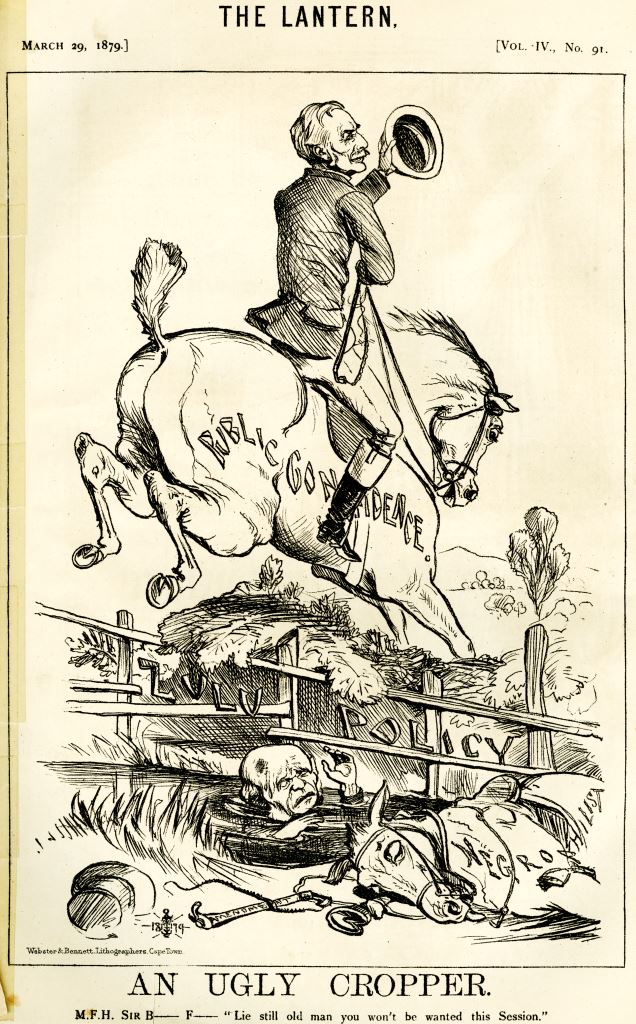
Pro-imperialist cartoon showing Sir Bartle Frere vanquishing the "negrophilist" liberals of the Cape government, represented by MP Saul Solomon.

The new governor was initially welcomed by the local (Molteno-Merriman) government of the Cape Colony, which was by far the largest and most powerful polity in the region.

However Frere soon encountered strong political resistance against the unpopular confederation project. In particular, the local Cape government took a non-interventionist approach towards the neighbouring Boer and Black African states of southern Africa. It was also relatively liberal in its domestic politics. Its formal response to Carnarvon's confederation model, conveyed to London via Frere's predecessor Sir Henry Barkly, had originally been that any federation with the illiberal Boer republics would endanger the rights and franchise of the Cape's Black citizens, and was therefore unacceptable. The Cape government also opposed Carnarvon's confederation plans, perceiving them as an attempt to override the Cape's constitution and extend British imperial control over the whole of southern Africa, which as they saw it would lead to an outbreak of conflicts between the British Empire and the remaining independent states in the region, such as Zululand and the Transvaal (something the Cape government was adamantly opposed to). The summary of Molteno's message was that "the proposals for confederation should emanate from the communities to be affected, and not be pressed upon them from outside."

At the time, the subcontinent was being afflicted by the worst drought in its recorded history and, as the historian De Kiewiet memorably said: "In South Africa, the heat of drought easily becomes the fever of war." It had begun in 1875, and by 1877 it was affecting the greater region. In September 1877, a minor tribal conflict erupted on the Cape frontier, between the Mfengu and Gcaleka tribes. The Cape government viewed the dispute as a local police matter, but Frere immediately traveled to the frontier and declared war on the neighbouring independent state of Gcalekaland. Frere saw the dispute as an opportunity to annex Gcalekaland for the planned confederation. Frere also expressed concerns that the continued existence of independent African states posed in his words an ever-present threat of a "general and simultaneous rising of Kaffirdom against white civilization". The 9th Frontier War soon broke out.

The Transkei Xhosa were defeated and annexed early in 1878, by Lord Chelmsford and a small force of regular and colonial troops.

Frere appealed (February 1878) and received the authority from the Colonial Office to dismiss the Cape's elected government. He then asked his political ally, John Gordon Sprigg, to form a puppet ministry. This unprecedented move solved his constitutional hindrances in the Cape, but was overshadowed by a growing set of conflicts across Southern Africa and Lord Carnarvon's resignation in early 1878.

=== Outbreak of Zulu and Boer Wars ===
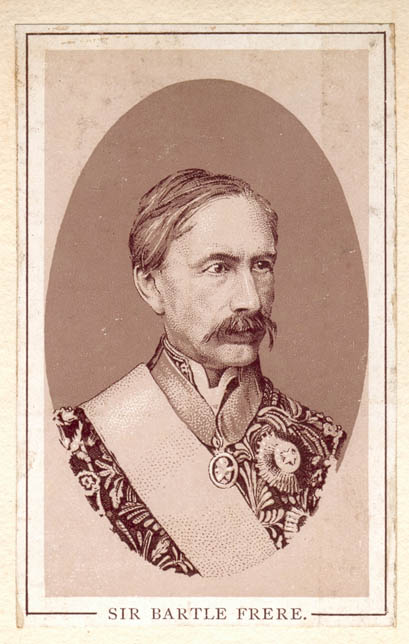
Sir Henry Bartle Frere in the 1880s.

The Zulu Kingdom under King Cetshwayo remained independent of British control but Frere impressed upon the Colonial Office his opinion that if confederation was to succeed, Cetshwayo's forces had to be eliminated and Zululand annexed. While Carnarvon remained as Colonial Secretary in London the view had support but his replacement, Sir Michael Hicks-Beach strongly wished to avoid any war in southern Africa. Frere nonetheless used the delay in mail between London and Cape Town, to time his letters so as to circumvent the Colonial Office's opposition to war. Frere then sent Cetshwayo an impossible ultimatum in December 1878, effectively declaring war.

Cetshwayo was unable to comply with Frere's ultimatum – even if he had wanted to; Frere ordered Lord Chelmsford to invade Zululand, and so the Anglo-Zulu War began. On 11 January 1879, British troops crossed the Tugela River; fourteen days later the disaster of Isandlwana was reported, and that was enough for the House of Commons to demand that Frere be recalled. Beaconsfield supported him, however, and in a strange compromise he was censured but asked to stay on. Frere had severely underestimated the Zulus, whom he had characterized as "a bunch of savages armed with sticks."

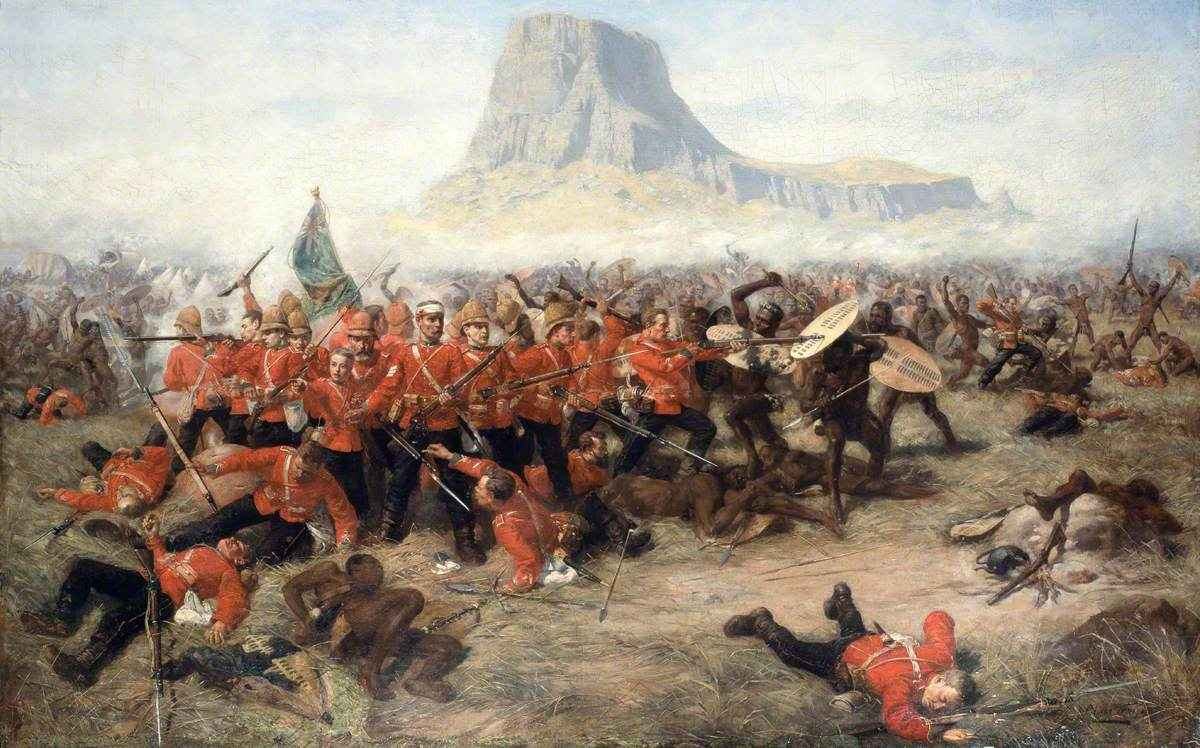
The Battle of Isandlwana, Anglo-Zulu War

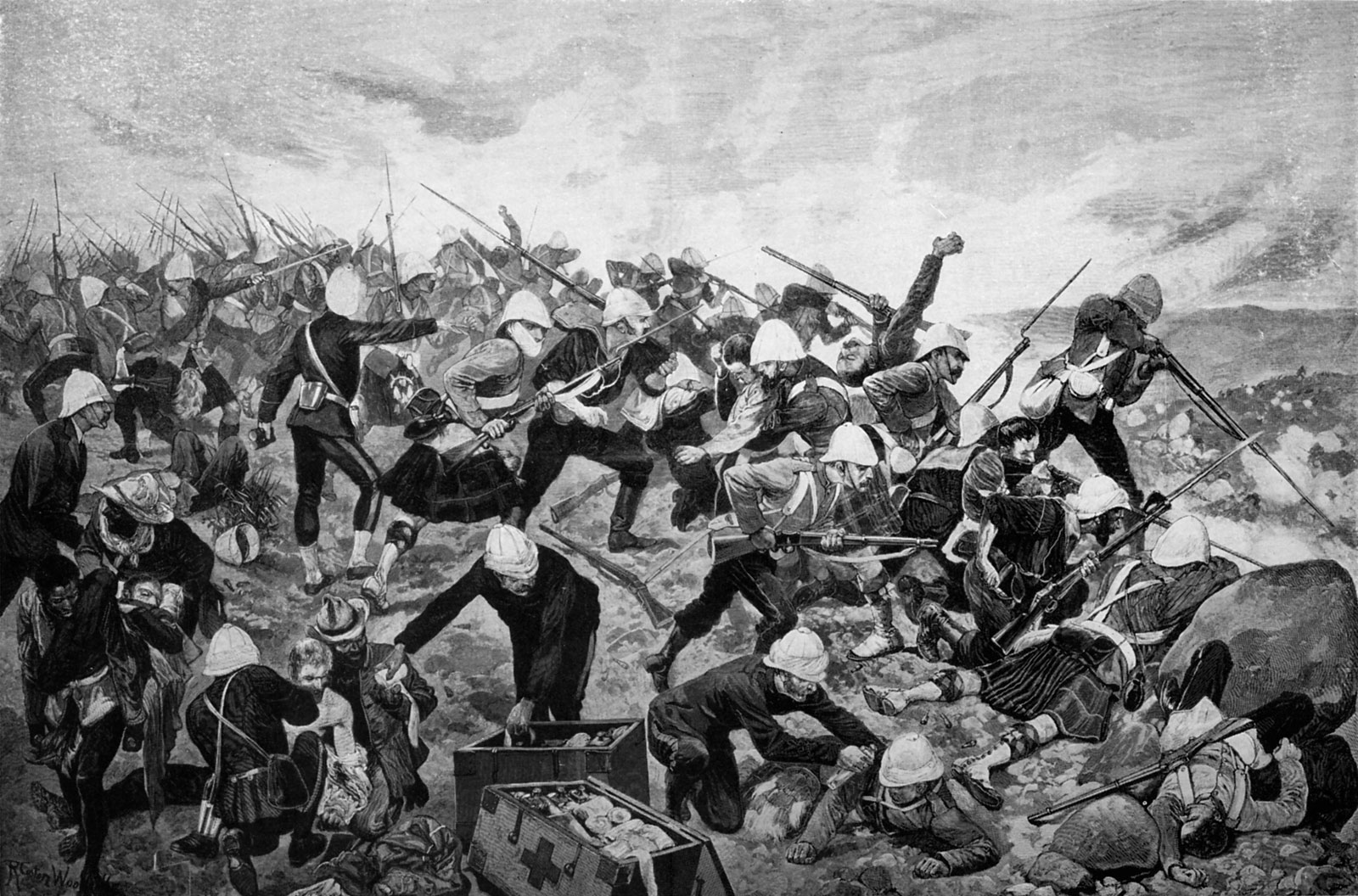
The Battle of Majuba Hill, First Boer War

The Zulu trouble, and disaffection brewing in the Transvaal, reacted upon each other most disastrously. The delay in giving the country a constitution afforded a pretext for agitation to the resentful Boers, a rapidly increasing minority, while the defeat at Isandlwana had badly tarnished the reputation of the British Empire in the region. Owing to the Xhosa and Zulu wars, Sir Bartle had been unable to give his undivided attention to the state of things in the Transvaal until April 1879, when he was at last able to visit a camp of about 4,000 disaffected Boers near Pretoria. Though conditions were grim, Frere managed to win the Boers' respect by promising to present their complaints to the British government, and to urge the fulfilment of the promises that had been made to them. The Boers did eventually disperse, on the very day upon which Frere received the telegram announcing the government's censure. On his return to Cape Town, he found that his achievement had been eclipsed—first by 1 June 1879 death of Napoleon Eugene, Prince Imperial in Zululand, and then by the news that the government of the Transvaal and Natal, together with the high commissionership in the eastern part of South Africa, had been transferred from him to Sir Garnet Wolseley. Meanwhile, growing Boer resentment at Frere's policies erupted in December 1880 into the disastrous First Boer War. The First Boer War, with the British defeats at Bronkhorstspruit, Laing's Nek, Schuinshoogte and a decisive defeat at Majuba Hill led to the confirmation of the Boer Republics' independence and the final end of Carnarvon's confederation scheme.

=== Outbreak of the Basotho Gun War ===
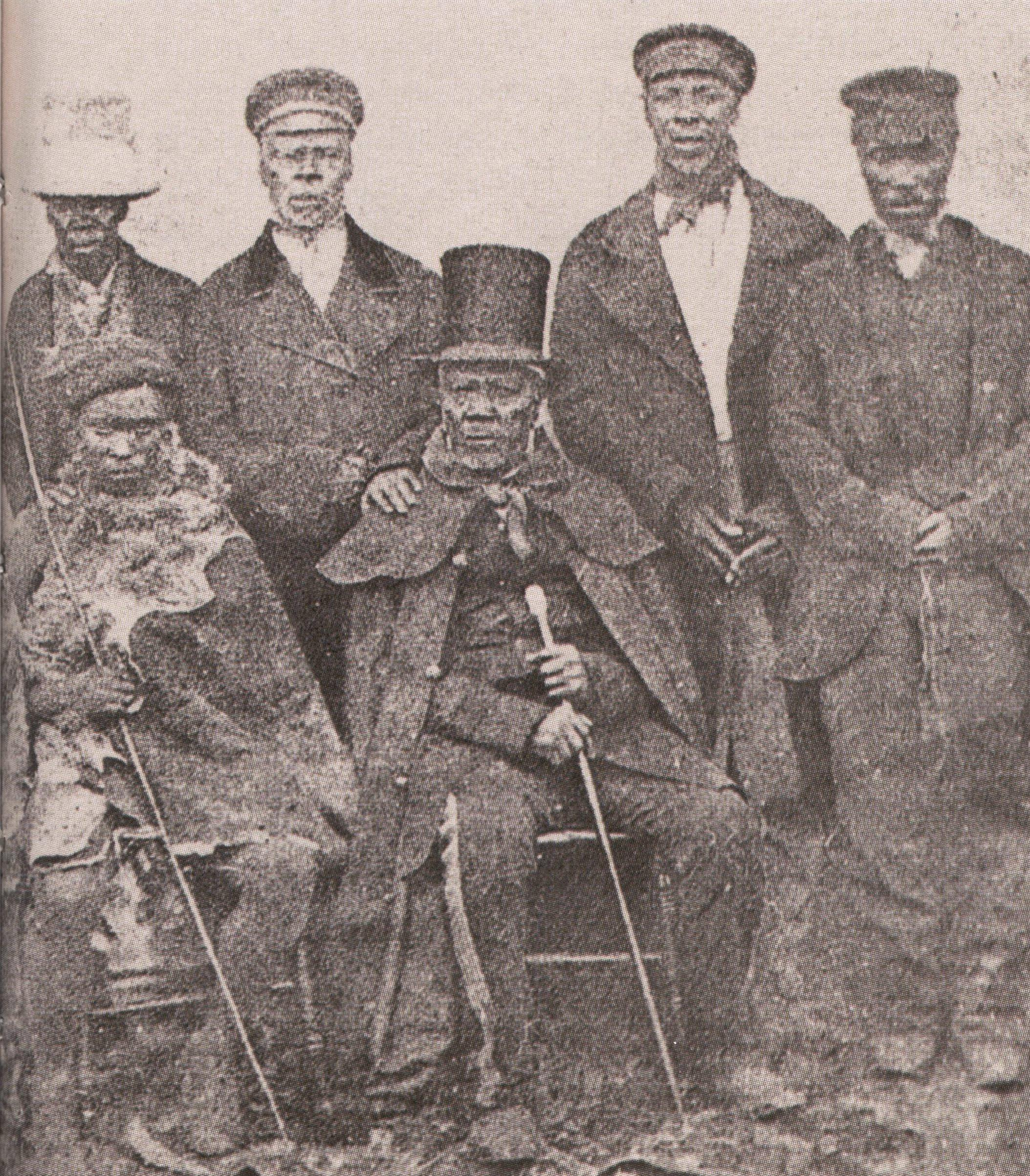
The Basotho King and ministers.

Basutoland, home of the Basotho people, had been under the nominal control of the Cape Colony since 1872. However the Cape government had allowed the Basotho leadership to keep much of their traditional authority and independence. As allies and trading partners of the Cape, the Basotho were also well-equipped with firearms.

Frere pushed "The Peace Protection Act" (1879), during the Xhosa Wars, and decreed that all those of African descent had to be disarmed. The Basuto Gun War (1880) followed, as the Basotho rebelled at what they saw as a racist and high-handed ruling. Premier John Gordon Sprigg's unpopular attempt to enforce this disarmament of the Basotho was aggravated by his setting aside of Basotho land for white settlement.

The resulting war led to British defeats such as that at Qalabani, and ended in 1881 with a stalemate and a treaty that favoured the Basotho. The rebellion is a primary reason why Lesotho is now an independent country and not part of surrounding South Africa. At the same time as the Basuto Gun War broke out, unrest flared up once again among the Xhosa of the Transkei.

=== Recall ===
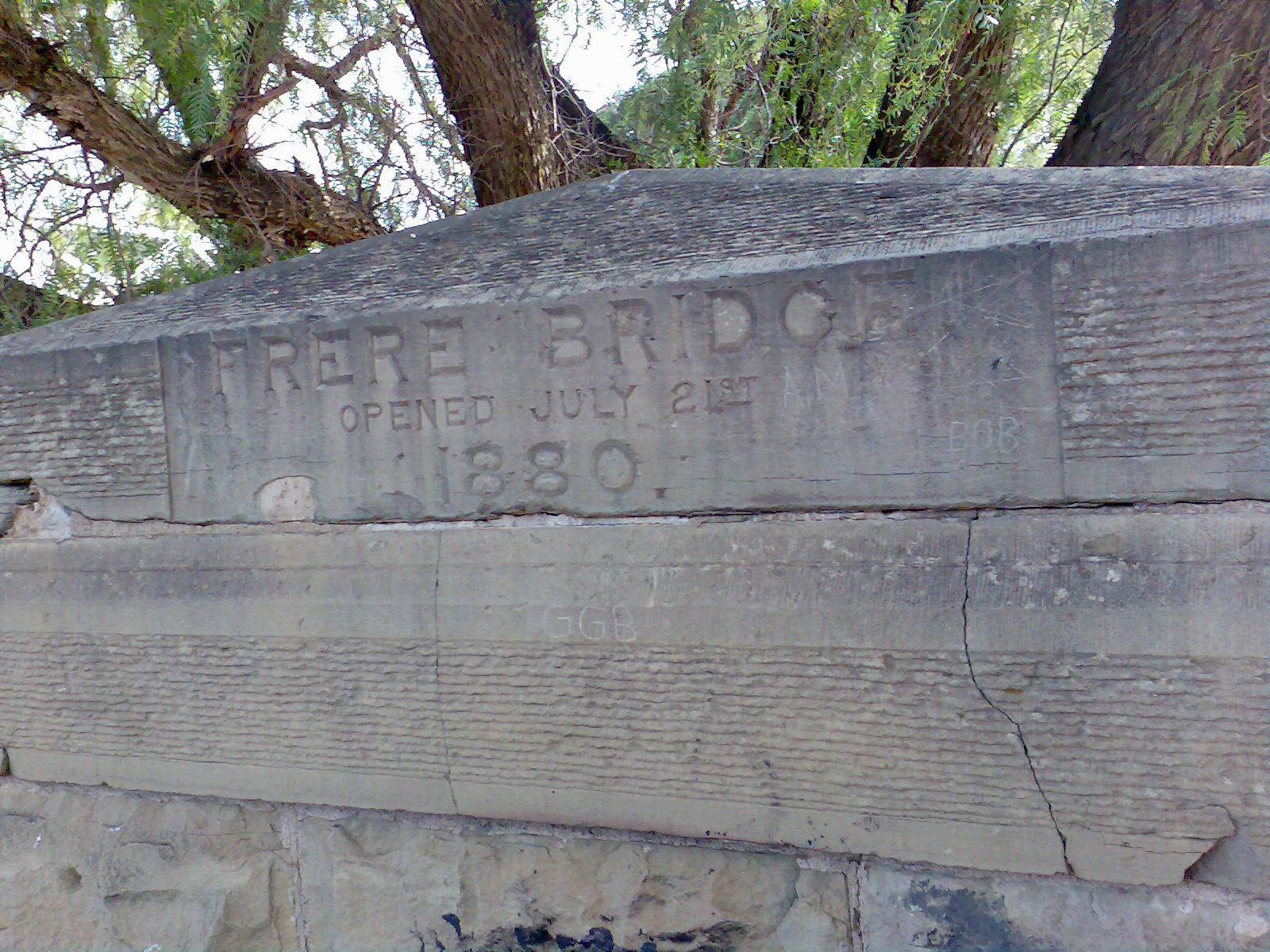
Remains of the Frere Bridge over the Orange River at Aliwal North. The bridge was opened on 21 July 1880, shortly before Frere's departure from the Cape.

In 1880 Frere was recalled to London to face charges of misconduct. When Gladstone's ministry first came into office in the spring of 1880, Lord Kimberley originally had no intention of recalling Frere. In June, however, a section of the Liberal party petitioned Gladstone to remove him, and the prime minister soon complied (1 August 1880).

The disaster of Isandlwana was compounded by the humiliating defeats of the First Boer War. He was replaced by Sir Garnet Wolseley, then charged with having acted recklessly, and censured by Whitehall.

== Death ==
Upon his return, Frere replied to the charges relating to his conduct with regard to Afghanistan as well as South Africa, previously referred to in Gladstone's Midlothian speeches, and was preparing a fuller vindication when he died at Wimbledon on 29 May 1884. He was buried in St Paul's Cathedral.

== Memorials ==
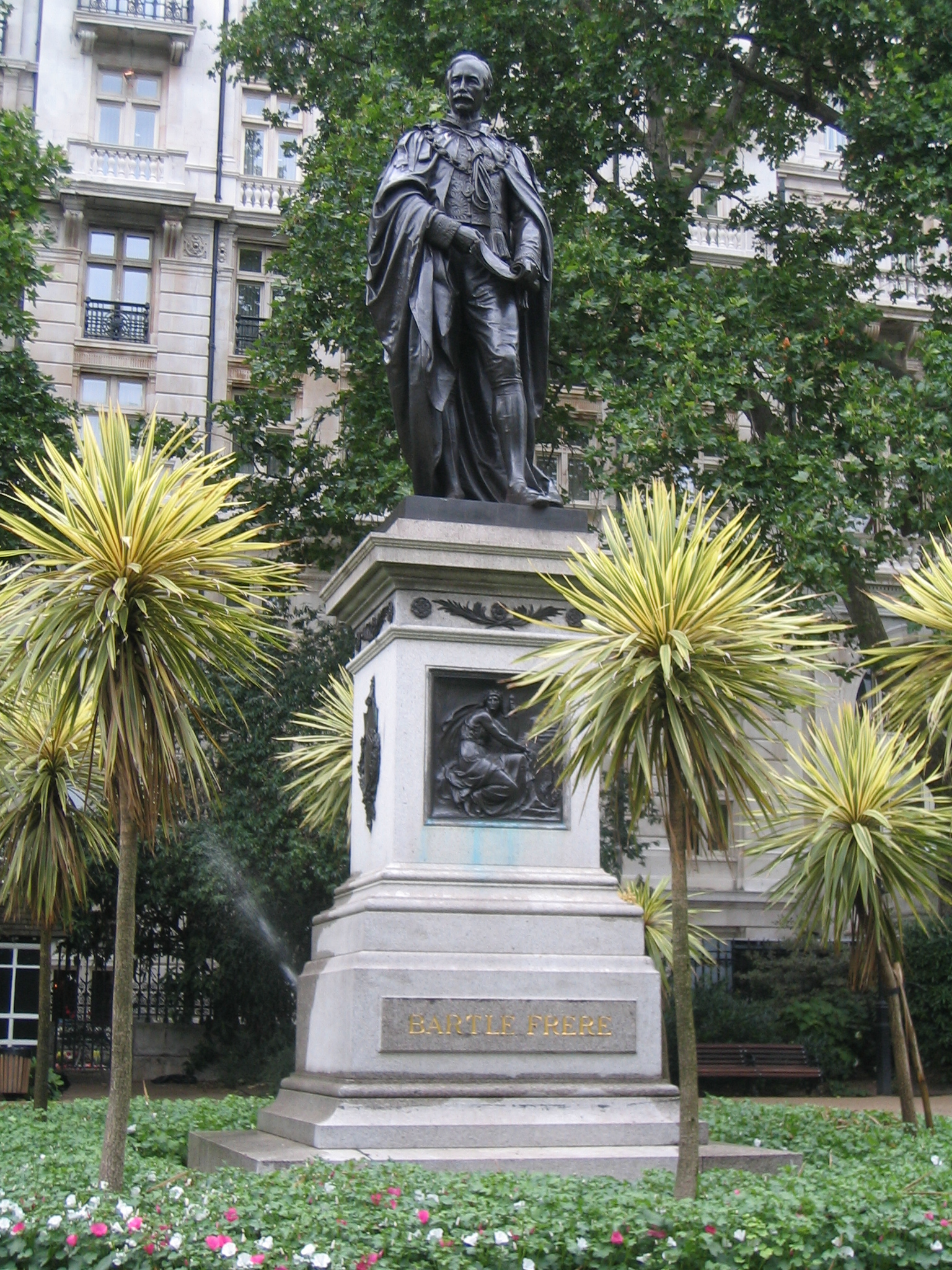
Henry Bartle Frere's statue on the Thames embankment

Frere was the founder and first president of the Royal Society of South Africa 1877.

Frere Hall in Karachi was built in his honour. The city also named a road, street and town after him. Karachi Grammar School's Frere House is named after him. In 1888, the Prince of Wales unveiled a statue of Frere on the Thames embankment. Mount Bartle Frere (1622m), the highest mountain in Queensland, Australia, is named after him, as is a boarding house at Haileybury. A road in Parktown, Johannesburg, is also named after him. (Frere Road was also the home of Nadine Gordimer, the Nobel Prize-winning author). In Durban, two roads honour him: Frere Road which later transforms into Bartle Road. Freretown, a district of the Kenyan city of Mombasa, is also named after him. Mount Frere (Now known as KwaBhaca) in the Eastern Cape also was named after him in the 19th century.

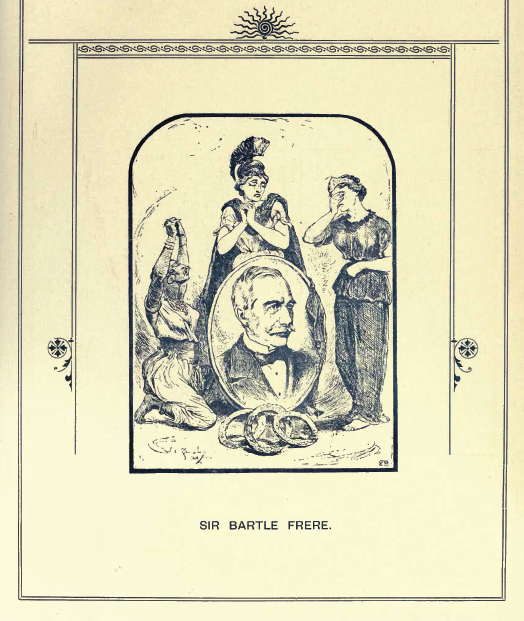
Memorial to Sir Bartle Frere in the Cape Lantern newspaper.

The botanist, N. A. Dalzell (1864) named the plant genus Frerea to commemorate H. B. Frere. It is a monotypic plant genus known by a single species, viz. Frerea indica Dalzell. Dalzell stated "Sir H. B. E. Frere, not only as a mark of esteem and respect, but also because he always has been the enlightened encourager and promoter of scientific researches in India, and is himself a close observer of nature." This species is now called Boucerosia frerei (G.D. Rowley) Meve & Liede (2002).

== Biographies ==
- Martineau, John (1895). The life and correspondence of the Right Hon. Sir Bartle Frere. Vol. 1. hdl:2263/8556.
- Martineau, John (1895). The life and correspondence of the Right Hon. Sir Bartle Frere. Vol. 2. hdl:2263/8556.

For the South African anti-confederation view, see P. A. Molteno's Life and Times of Sir John Charles Molteno (2 vols., London 1900).

- Molteno, Percy Alport (1900). The Life and Times of Sir John Charles Molteno. Vol. 1.
- Molteno, Percy Alport (1900). The Life and Times of Sir John Charles Molteno. Vol. 2.

A more recent work on Bartle Frere's life, The Zulu and the Raj; The Life of Sir Bartle Frere by D. P. O'Connor, examines details of Frere's life and motives more fully than was permissible in Victorian times when Martineau was writing. In particular, O'Connor points to Frere as a leading thinker on imperial defence. He sets the Zulu war in the context of the overall global crisis, contingent on the Russo-Turkish War (1877–1878), which was widely expected to result in war between Britain and Russia. Frere was sent to South Africa to turn this vital area into a secure bastion on the route to India, but was distracted from the task by the routine instability of the South African theatre.

== Popular culture ==
Frere was played by Sir John Mills in Zulu Dawn. His portrayal in the film is negative.

== See also ==
- Horniman Circle Gardens
- Mount Frere

== Notes ==
Government offices
Preceded by Robert Keith Pringle	Commissioner in Sind; 1851–59	Succeeded by Jonathan Duncan Inverarity
Preceded by Sir George Clerk	Governor of Bombay; 1862–67	Succeeded by Sir William Fitzgerald
Preceded by Sir Henry Barkly	Governor of Cape Colony; High Commissioner for Southern Africa; 1877–1880	Succeeded by Sir Hercules Robinson
Baronetage of the United Kingdom
New title Granted by Queen Victoria	Baronet (of Wimbledon); 1876–1884	Succeeded by Bartle Compton Arthur Frere
