= River Clydach, Monmouthshire =

River in Monmouthshire, Wales

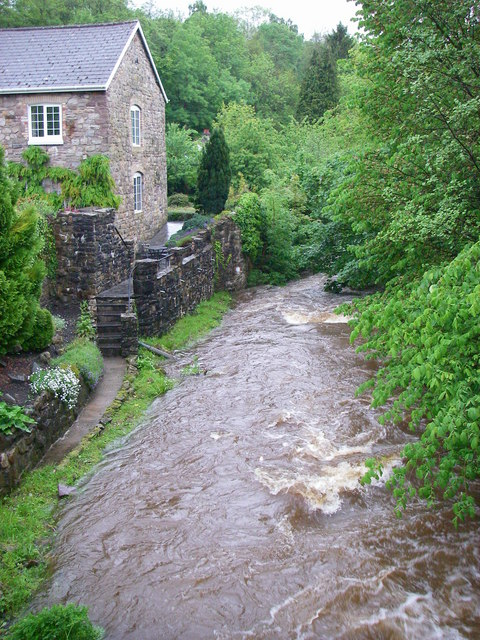
River Clydach

The River Clydach is a short, steep and fast-flowing river in Monmouthshire and the county borough of Blaenau Gwent in south Wales. It lies within the Brecon Beacons National Park. It is around 10 kilometres (6 mi) in length.

The river rises on the southern slopes of Mynydd Llangatwg (51.8122°N 3.1939°W) then heads south-east through Clydach Dingle past Brynmawr. It then enters the spectacular Clydach Gorge, dropping about 300 metres (1,000 ft) to Gilwern and its confluence with the River Usk (51.8329°N 3.1007°W).

"Clydach" is a common name for watercourses in south Wales and is thought to derive from an old Welsh word for "swift" or possibly "stoney", both of which would apply in this case.
