= Clydach Gorge =

Valley in south-east Wales

Coordinates: 51.812°N 3.122°W

The Clydach Gorge (also known as Cwm Clydach) is a steep-sided valley in south-east Wales down which the River Clydach flows to the River Usk.

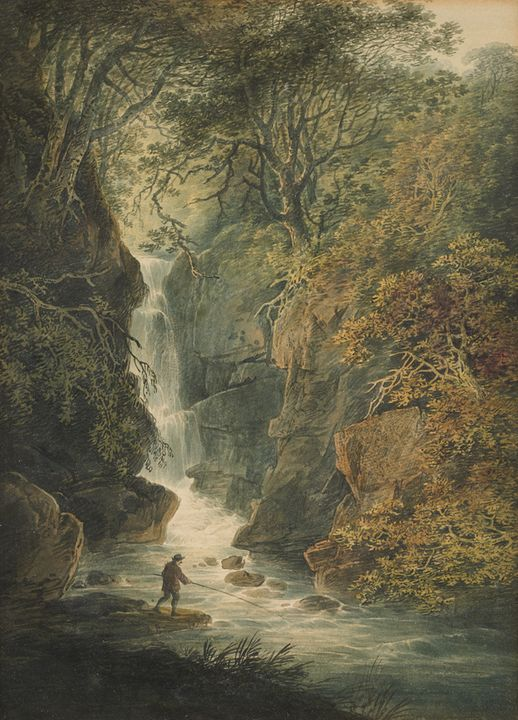
The Waterfall on the Clydach Gorge c.1800 by William Payne

It runs for 5.6 kilometres (3.5 mi) from the vicinity of Brynmawr in Blaenau Gwent eastwards and northeastwards to Gilwern in Monmouthshire. The Gorge was one of the first locations in the region to be industrialised though it still retains its natural environment. It has long been an important transport corridor between Abergavenny and the lowlands of Monmouthshire and the northeastern quarter of the South Wales Coalfield. It is now exploited by the A465 Heads of the Valleys trunk road which runs between Abergavenny and Swansea and which serves the Heads of the Valleys sub-region.

The Gorge is included within the Brecon Beacons National Park and is a tourist destination in its own right, with facilities including a picnic site, waymarked footpaths, the National Cycle Network and car parking alongside the River Clydach, easily reached from the Heads of the Valleys Road. It includes Smart's Bridge, a cast iron bridge and the remains of a late 18th-century ironworks which are now a Scheduled Ancient Monument. There are also limeworks.

== Settlements ==
The industrial town of Brynmawr sits at the head of the gorge and the large village of Gilwern sits at its foot in the Usk valley. Although development along the gorge and its sides are semi-continuous, the linear settlements of Clydach (now Clydach South), Blackrock, Cheltenham (now Clydach North) and Maesygwartha can be distinguished along the roads between Brynmawr and Gilwern, mainly to the north of the river. The settlement of Llanelly Hill occupies the northwest hilltop of the gorge.

== Industrial heritage sites ==
=== Ironworks ===
==== Llanelly Furnace and Forge ====
The Hanbury family of Pontypool established a furnace and forge here (OS grid ref SO 236140) in the sixteenth century though nothing now remains of them other than parts of the masonry dam of a pool connected with the water power used for the forge. Wrought iron was made at the furnace from cast iron using charcoal. A tinworks also operated at this site at one time.

==== Clydach Ironworks ====
The Clydach Ironworks was the most significant ironworks developed in the Cwm Gorge. The Ironworks were constructed around 1793–95 after coke had been introduced as a fuel for blast furnaces. By 1841 the works was responsible for the employment of more than 1350 people though many of this number were associated with obtaining iron ore, limestone and coal further up the valley. These ironworks had a great influence on the industrial and social developments of the surrounding area. Due to this, building began on buildings for settling the workers at the end of the 18th century, increasing house production during the 2nd quarter of the 19th century. The works could be approached over a cast iron bridge, Smart's Bridge (built in 1824). Production continued up until around 1860, where it was the main point of activity within the gorge.

The works were associated with the Frere family (which included Sir Bartle Frere, born in Clydach House in 1815).

The remains of two large masonry furnaces from the 1790s and the base of a later furnace can still be seen together with other structures thanks to an excavation carried out in 1986.

=== Limeworks ===
==== Blackrock Limeworks ====
These limeworks were the first established in the gorge, having started production in 1794/95. From Blackrock, the quarry extends along the contours of the gorge above Clydach North (also referred to as Cheltenham). They continued to work until 1908 and the masonry limekilns remain today.

==== Clydach Limeworks ====
The limeworks at Clydach (OS grid ref SO 233127) were built in 1877 to provide lime for the construction of the nearby Nant Dyar railway viaduct. Two pairs of limekilns remain against an impressive quarried backdrop.

==== Llanelly Limeworks ====
Llanelly Quarry supplied the Clydach Ironworks with limestone, and subsequently lime for farming and building mortars. It closed finally in 1962. Two pairs of limekilns remain alongside the Merthyr, Tredegar and Abergavenny Railway and National Cycle Route.

== Transport ==
=== Tramroads and railways ===
==== Clydach Railroad ====
This early railroad was constructed during 1793–4 by the engineer John Dadford. It linked Wain Dew colliery at Beaufort with Glangrwyne Forge on the banks of the River Usk. An important surviving feature of the railroad is the single-arched bridge of coarse rubble-stone near Maesygwartha which is impressively set above a waterfall (at OS grid ref SO 230138). A tramroad linked into the Clydach Ironworks from the Clydach Railroad by means of a cast-iron bridge. Constructed by Smart in 1824, it is one of the earliest in the world.

==== Llam-march Tramroad ====
Engineered by Thomas Dadford in 1793-4, this tramroad (also sometimes referred to as the Llam-march Railroad) to link the Clydach ironworks with the coal mines and iron ore deposits at Gellifelen and Llam-march. There is a single-arched stone bridge at SO 233137 and SO 255176, the latter being the Llam-march Tramroad and Aqueduct Bridge of 1811 which also carried water from the Clydach to the Clydach Ironworks Rolling Mill via a leat.

==== Govilon Tramroad ====
Engineered by Crawshay Bailey in 1821, this tramroad (sometimes also referred to as Bailey's Tramroad) traverses the southeastern slopes of the gorge below and parallel to the Llam-march Tramroad. It connected the Bailey's ironworks at Nantyglo with the Monmouthshire and Brecon Canal at Govilon, in the Usk Valley.

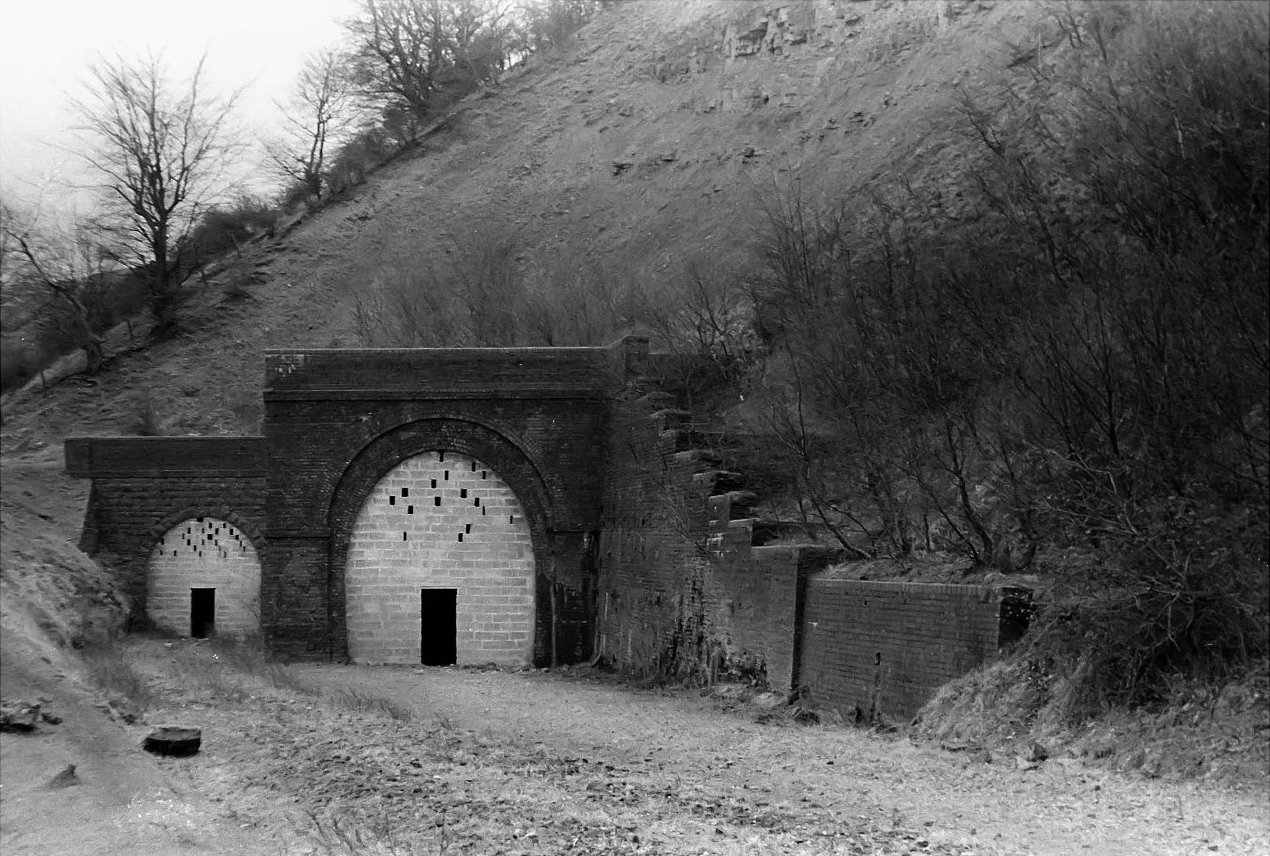
Railway tunnel at Clydach Gorge, 1973

==== Merthyr Tredegar and Abergavenny Railway ====
See main article on Merthyr, Tredegar and Abergavenny Railway

The railway was constructed in 1862 as a single line, following in part, the line of the earlier Govilon tramroad. Four years later it became a part of the London and North Western Railway network and in 1877 the line was doubled along its entire length. The routing of the line through the gorge was a considerable engineering challenge requiring the digging of several tunnels and the construction of an impressive curving viaduct across the ravine of the Nant Dyar. The line continued in operation until the 1950s when British Railways decided to close it as being uneconomical to run. The last trains ran along it in June 1958. The larger part of the track-bed has now been converted to a cycleway, forming part of route 46 of the National Cycle Network.

=== Roads ===
==== Merthyr Tydfil to Govilon Turnpike ====
The Merthyr Tydfil to Govilon Turnpike was authorised by Act of Parliament and laid through the valley in 1812–13. This formed the main road through the gorge until the construction of a road on a new alignment in the 1960s.

==== Heads of the Valleys Road ====
See main article on A465 road

The A465 was dualled through the gorge between 2013 and 2021. The previous alignment of this major trunk road through the gorge was constructed in the 1960s by John Morgan (Construction) Ltd of Cardiff. Achieving a consistent gradient of 1 in 20 for a distance of 4 kilometres (2.5 mi) it climbs 210 metres (690 ft) from Gilwern to Brynmawr. Its construction involved considerable cutting and embanking and some sections were built out over the gorge on concrete pillars. Work began in March 1960 and it was opened to traffic in 1962. It was a single-carriageway route with two west-bound lanes running up the gorge. Work to construct a dual carriageway through the gorge began in January 2015.

== Environmental protection ==
The entire Clydach Gorge falls within the Brecon Beacons National Park designated in 1957 in order that its landscapes be protected and for the quiet enjoyment of them by the public. Subsequently, considerable parts of the gorge have also been protected for their wildlife and habitats, including the Cwm Clydach SSSI, Cwm Clydach National Nature Reserve, the Cwm Clydach Woodlands SAC and the Usk Bat Sites SAC, which also extends across much of the neighbouring Mynydd Llangatwg.

There are, in addition, numerous scheduled ancient monuments within the gorge, representing a history of human occupation from the Iron Age to the Industrial Revolution. Though the gorge is not included within it, the Blaenavon Industrial Landscape, a World Heritage Site, adjoins the area. The former Forgotten Landscapes Project included both the WHS and the Gorge within a wider area. The Project sought to conserve and restore the built features of an area which was key to the Industrial Revolution.
