= List of commissioners and governors of Sind (British India) =

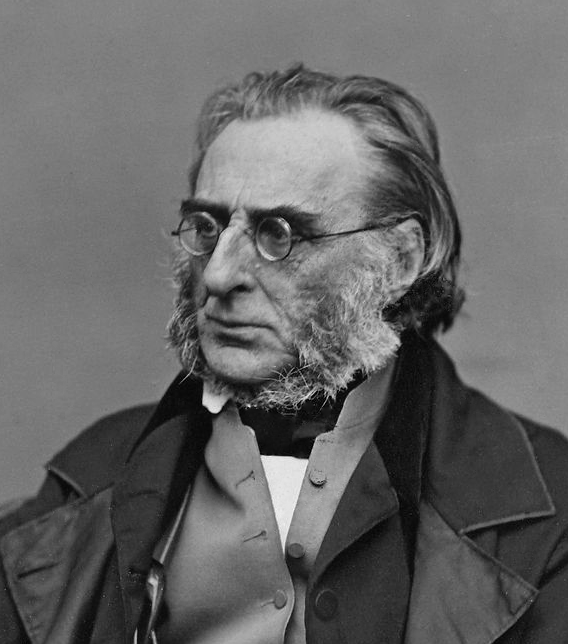
Sir Charles Napier

The Commissioner for Province of Sind, later the Governor of Sind, was the most important government official in the province during British rule. There were 104 years of rule, out of which 89 years were under their authority. Sind was a part of the Bombay Presidency, earlier under Sir Charles Napier. However, in 1936 it became a separate province.

== Governor of Sind ==
- 1843–1847: Sir Charles Napier became the first ever Chief Commissioner and Governor of Sind.

== Commissioners for Sind ==
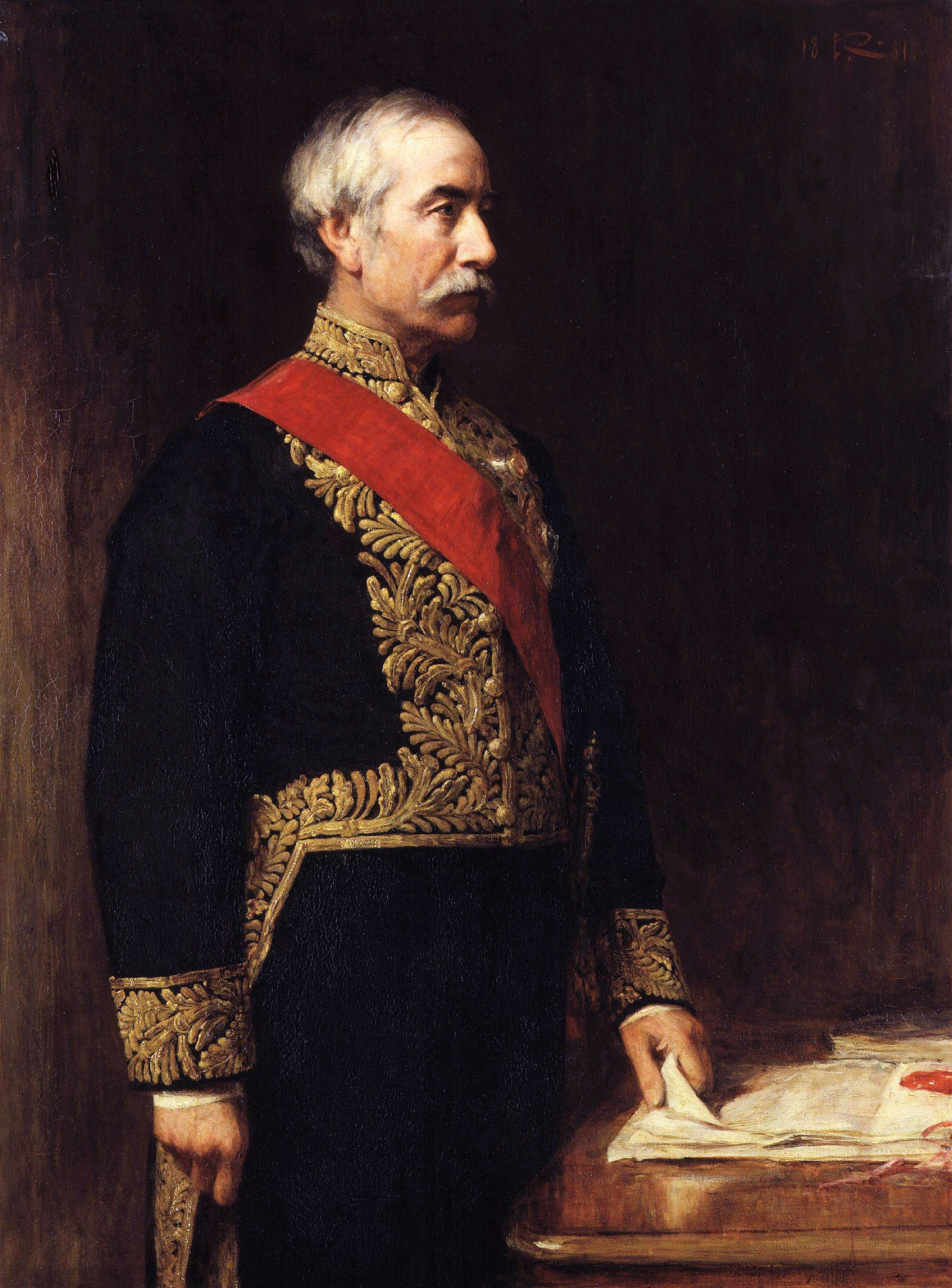
Sir Bartle Frere, Commissioner of Sind during British India

Sir Lancelot Graham as Governor of Sind

Commissioners who served British India are as follows:

- 1847–1850: Robert Keith Pringle
- 1851–1859: Henry Bartle Edward Frere
- 1859–1862: Jonathan Duncan Inverarity
- 1862–1867: Samuel Mansfield
- 1867–1868: William Henry Havelock
- 1867–1877: William Lockyer Merewether
- 1877–1879: Francis Dawes Melville
- 1879–1887: Henry Napier Bruce Erskine
- 1887–1889: Charles Bradley Pritchard
- 1889–1891: Arthur Charles Trevor
- 1891–1900: Henry Evan Murchison James
- 1900–1902: Robert Giles
- 1902–1903: Alexander Cumine
- 1903–1904: Horace Charles Mules
- 1904–1905: John William Pitt Muir-Mackenzie
- 1905–1912: Arthur Delaval Younghusband
- 1912–1916: William Henry Lucas
- 1916–1920: Henry Staveley Lawrence
- 1920–1925: Jean Louis Rieu
- 1925–1926: Patrick Robert Cadell
- 1926–1929: Walter Frank Hudson
- 1929–1931: George Arthur Thomas
- 1931–1935: Raymond Evelyn Gibson
- 1935–1936: Godfrey Ferdinando Stratford Collins (officiating)

== Governors of Sind ==
Governors who served British India are as follows:

- 1936–1941: Sir Lancelot Graham, 1 April 1936 to 31 March 1941
- 1941–1946: Sir Hugh Dow
- 1946–1947: Sir Robert Francis Mudie
- 1953–1954: Habib Ibrahim Rahimtoola

== See also ==
- Thatta Subah
- Governor of Sindh
