= 1866 Birthday Honours =

Appointments by Queen Victoria

The 1866 Birthday Honours were appointments by Queen Victoria to various orders and honours to reward and highlight good works by citizens of the British Empire. The appointments were made to celebrate the official birthday of the Queen, and were published in The London Gazette on 25 May and 29 May 1866.

The recipients of honours are displayed here as they were styled before their new honour, and arranged by honour, with classes (Knight, Knight Grand Cross, etc.) and then divisions (Military, Civil, etc.) as appropriate.

== United Kingdom and British Empire ==
=== Duke and Earl ===
- His Royal Highness Prince Alfred Ernest Albert KG KT, as Earl of Ulster, Earl of Kent, and Duke of Edinburgh

=== Earl ===
- The Right Honourable John, Baron Wodehouse, by the name, style, and title of Earl of Kimberley, of Kimberley, in the county of Norfolk

=== The Most Exalted Order of the Star of India ===
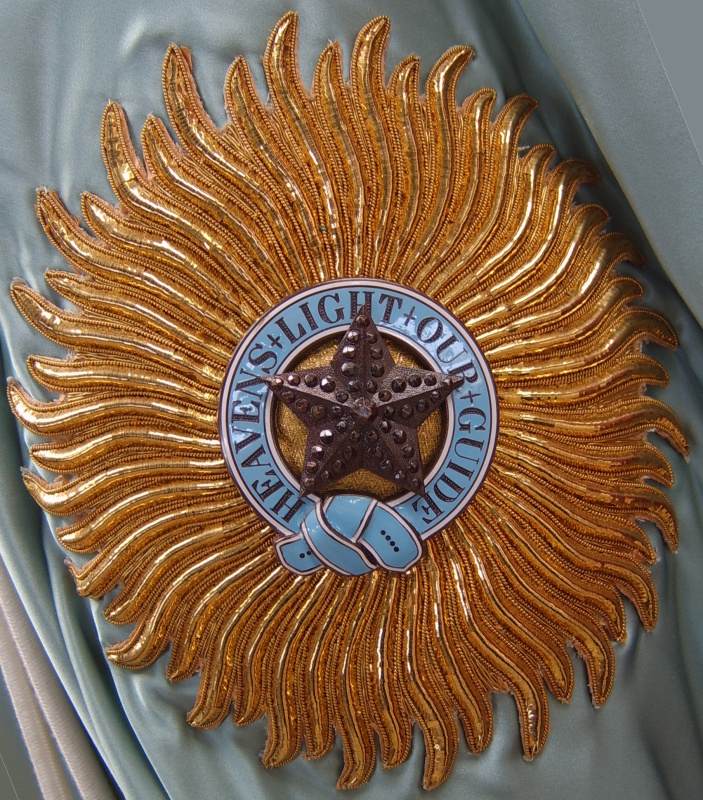
Star of a Knight Grand Commander of the Most Exalted Order of the Star of India

==== Knight Commander (KCSI) ====
- The Rajah Shreemun Maharajah Chuttroputtee Shahabe Dam Altafhoo, of Kolhapoor
- Cecil Beadon, Bengal Civil Service, Lieutenant-Governor of Bengal
- The Nawab Salar Jung Bahadoor, of Hyderabad, in the Deccan
- Donald Friell McLeod CB Bengal Civil Service, Lieutenant-Governor of the Punjab
- The Maharajah Jeypercash Singh Bahadoor, of Deo, in Behar
- Henry Ricketts, Bengal Civil Service (Retired), late Member of the Council of the Governor-General of India
- The Maharajah Mirza Gajapati Raz Maune Sultan
- Bahadoor, Zemindar of Vizianagram, Member of Council of the Governor-General of India for making Laws and Regulations
- Henry Byng Harington, Bengal Civil Service (Retired), late Member of the Council of the Governor-General of India
- The Maharajah Dig Bijye Singh, of Bulrampoor
- Walter Elliot, Madras Civil Service (Retired), late Member of the Council of the Governor of Madras
- Sharf-ul-Omrah Bahadoor, Member of the Council of the Governor-General of India for making Laws and Regulations
- Thomas Pycroft, Madras Civil Service, Member of the Council of the Governor of Madras
- The Rajah Jymungul Singh, of Gidhore, in Monghyr
- John Macpherson Macleod, Madras Civil Service (Retired), Member of the Indian Law Commission
- The Rajah Dinkur Rao, late Member of the Council of the Governor-General of India for making Laws and Regulations
- Major-General Isaac Campbell Coffin, Madras Army, late Commanding the Hyderabad Subsidiary Force
- The Rajah Radhakanth Deb
- Major-General George St Patrick Lawrence CB Bengal Staff Corps, late Agent to the Governor-General of India at Rajpootana
- The Rajah of Drangadra
- Major-General George Moyle Sherer, late Bengal Army, sometime commanding the 73rd Regiment of Bengal Native Infantry
- The Rajah Deo Narain Singh, of Benares
- Major-General Sir Arthur Thomas Cotton Kt Royal (late Madras) Engineers
- Meer Shere Mahomed, of Meerpoor
- Major-General Sir Neville Bowles Chamberlain KCB Bengal Army, late commanding the Punjab Irregular Force
- The Rajah Sahib Dyal Missar, Member of the Council of the Governor-General of India for making Laws and Regulations
- George Udny Yule CB Bengal Civil Service, resident at Hyderabad
- Tanjore Madava Rao Dewan, of Travancore
- Charles John Wingfield CB Bengal Civil Service, late Chief Commissioner of Oude
- The Thakoor Rawul Jeswunt Singjee, of Bhownuggur
- Colonel Sir Herbert Benjamin Edwardes KCB Bengal Army, Commissioner and Agent to the Governor-General of India in the Cis-Sutlej States, Hakeem Saadut Ali Khan
- Colonel Arnold Burrowes Kemball CB Royal (late Bombay) Artillery, Political Agent in Turkish Arabia
- Sirdar Nihal Singh Chachi
- Lieutenant-Colonel Thomas Wilkinson, late Bengal Army, sometime resident at Nagpoor
- Lieutenant-Colonel Robert Wallace, Bombay Staff Corps, late resident at Baroda
- Lieutenant-Colonel William Henry Rodes Green CB Bombay Staff Corps, Political Superintendent in Upper Scinde
- Major George Wingate, late Bombay Engineers, sometime Member of the Survey Commission at Bombay

==== Companion (CSI) ====
- The Nawab Syed Asghur Ali Khan
- Fleetwood Williams, Bengal Civil Service, Commissioner of Revenue and Circuit for the Meerut Division
- The Nawab Foujdar Khan
- Charles Raikes, Bengal Civil Service (retired), late Judge of the Sudder Dewannee and Nizamut Adawlut, North West Provinces
- The Rajah Bindessery Pershad, of Sirgooja and Oodeypoor
- Samuel Mansfield, Bombay Civil Service, Commissioner in Scinde
- The Rajah Pertab Chund Singh
- Arthur Austin Roberts CB Benga Civil Service, Judicial Commissioner in the Punjab
- The Rajah Sutto Chund Ghosal
- Cudbert Bensley Thornhill, Bengal Civi Service, Commissioner of Revenue and Circuit at Allahabad
- The Rajah Yelugoti Kumara Yachamu Nayuda Bahadoor, Zemindar of Veukatagiri
- William Ford, Bengal Civil Service Commissioner at Mooltan
- The Rajah Bhowanee Singh, of Mynpoorie
- William Rose Robinson, Madras Civil Service, Inspector-General of Police, Madras Presidency
- Colonel Crawford Trotter Chamberlain, Bengal Staff Corps, Commandant of the 1st Bengal Cavalry
- The Rajah Sheoraj Singh, of Kasheepoor
- Colonel Richard Strachey, Royal (late Bengal) Engineers, late Secretary in the Public Works Department, Government of India
- The Rajah Teekum Singh, of Morsan
- Colonel Reynell George Taylor CB Bengal Staff Corps, Commissioner in the Punjab
- The Rajah Jeswunt Rao, of Etawah
- Colonel Alfred Thomas Wilde CB Madras Staff Corps, Commanding the Punjab Irregular Force
- Dhe Rajah of Bansee, Goruckpoor
- Colonel William Frederick Marriott, Bombay Staff Corps, Military Secretary to Government at Bombay
- The Rajah Hurdeo Bux Bahadoor, of Kutyaree
- Richard Temple, Bengal Civil Service, Chief Commissioner in the Central Provinces
- The Rajah Dig Bijye Singh, of Morarmow
- John Walter Sherer, Bengal Civil Service, Magistrate and Collector in Bundlecund
- The Dewan Cheeboo Lama
- James Davidson Gordon, Bengal Civil Service, Magistrate and Collector at Pubna
- The Dewan Moolla Buksh, of Patna
- Lieutenant-Colonel Edward John Lake, Royal (late Bengal) Engineers, Financial Commissioner in the Punjab
- Sirdar Soorut Singh, of Benares
- Lieutenant-Colonel John Colpoys Haughton, Bengal Staff Corps, Commissioner at Cooch-Behar
- Syud Azimooddeen Hussun Khan Bahadoor
- William Mackenzie CB Deputy Inspector-General of Hospitals, Madras Establishment
- Syud Hussun al Edroos, of Surat
- Lieutenant-Colonel Richard John Meade, Bengal Army, Agent for the Governor-General of India in Central India
- Ruggonath Row Wittul, Chief of Vinchoor
- Major Richard Harte Keatinge VC Bombay Staff Corps, Political Agent at Kattywar
- Ghulam Ali Khan, Jaghirdar of Bunganapalle
- Major William McNeile, Bengal Staff Corps, Deputy Commissioner in the Punjab
- Baboo Prosunno Comar Tagne
- Major John William Younghusband, Bombay Staff Corps, Inspector-General of Police in the Hyderabad Districts
- Baboo Amendanath Roy, of Nattore
- Eyre Burton Powell, Director of Public Instruction at Madras
- Madanna Juggah Rao, of Rajahmundry
- Sheth Maomull, of Kurrachee
- John Fleming, of Bombay
- Gajalu Lakshminarasu Seth
- Abdoollah David Sassoon, of Bombay
