= Pycroft =

Pycroft is a surname. Notable people with the surname include:

- Andy Pycroft (born 1956), Zimbabwean cricketer
- James Pycroft (1813–1895), British writer
- Arthur Pycroft (1875–1971), New Zealand ornithologist

Fictional characters:

- Hall Pycroft, character in "The Adventure of the Stockbroker's Clerk", a Sherlock Holmes story by Arthur Conan Doyle

== See also ==
- Pycroft's petrel
