= Hedley Powell Jacobs =

English journalist, historian and author

Hedley Powell Jacobs OBE
- Born: 15 March 1904; Halifax, Yorkshire, England
- Died: 10 October 1985 (aged 81); Kingston, Jamaica
- Education: University of Oxford
- Known for: Co-founder of the People's National Party, 1938.

Hedley Powell Jacobs OBE (15 March 1904 – 10 October 1985) was an English journalist, historian, writer, and socialist, who emigrated to Jamaica and was one of the founders of the People's National Party in 1938.

== Early life and family ==
Hedley Powell Jacobs was born on 15 March 1904 in Halifax, Yorkshire, to Creswell Thomas Jacobs and Annie Jacobs. His father was born in Abergavenny and worked as the company secretary in a gas plant manufacturing company. He was christened in Elland, York, in April 1904. He a BA at the University of Oxford.

He married Lily Elizabeth Thomas, the daughter of the reverend Charles R. G. Thomas, in Saint Andrew Parish, Jamaica, in 1938.

== Career ==
Jacobs emigrated to Jamaica in 1926. He taught at Jamaica College. In 1936 he was admitted to The Linguistic Society of America with a specialism in Teutonic and Creole languages.

He was the vice president of the National Reform Association (founded March 1938), a forerunner of the People's National Party, of which he was on the founding committee.

In 1945, he was the first editor of The Jamaican Historical Review, journal of the Jamaican Historical Society, an organisation of which he was also president, arguing in his article "The Untapped Sources of Jamaican History" for the inclusion of linguistic and folklore material in the study of the Jamaican working class during slavery in order to avoid their history becoming a history of the ruling class.

He was a justice of the peace and the general secretary of the Jamaica Imperial Association, later the Farquharson Institute of Public Affairs.

In 1966 he was made a member of the Order of the British Empire for public services to literature and history.

== Death and legacy ==
Jacobs died on 10 October 1985 in Kingston, Jamaica, from the effects of pneumonia and a bleeding duodenal ulcer.

== Selected publications ==
=== Articles ===
- "The Untapped Sources of Jamaican History", The Jamaican Historical Review, Vol. 1 (1945), pp. 92–98.
- "Matters of Some Importance", West Indian Review, Vol. 2, No. 29 (New Series) (18 November 1950)
- "The Spanish Period of Jamaican History: An Assessment of the Present State of Knowledge", The Jamaican Historical Review, Vol. 3, pp. 79–93.
- "The Achievement of Frank Cundall", Jamaica Journal, Vol. 2, No. 1 (March 1968), pp. 24–28.
- "Old Bedward of Spring Garden", Jamaica Journal, Vol. 6, No. 2 (1972), pp. 9–13.

=== Books ===
- Case Study: Government and Politics in Jamaica. 1955.
- Contempt of Court; Counsel's opinion on the application of the sub judice principle in relation to freedom of discussion and enquiry. Farquharson Institute of Public Affairs, 1970.
- Sixty Years of Change, 1806-1866: Progress and reaction in Kingston and the countryside. Institute of Jamaica, Kingston, 1973.

=== Children's ===
- A Short History of Kingston. Ministry of Education, Kingston, 1976, OCLC 4641319
- A Short History of Jamaica. Vol. 1, 1692-1871. Ministry of Education, Kingston, 1976.

== See also ==
- Frank Cundall
- Noël B. Livingston
