= Mysore Commission =

Provisional government of the Kingdom of Mysore from 1831 to 1881

Chief Commissioner of the Kingdom of Mysore
- Status: Abolished
- Reports to: Governor-General of India
- Residence: Bangalore
- Appointer: Governor-General of India
- Formation: 19 October 1831
- Abolished: 22 February 1881

The Mysore Commission, also known as Commissioners' Rule or simply the Commission Rule, was a period and form of government in the history of the Kingdom of Mysore and the neighbouring province of Coorg from 1831 to 1881 when British commissioners administered the kingdom due to the deposition of Maharaja Krishnaraja Wodeyar III and later during the minority of Yuvaraja Chamaraja Wadiyar X. A board of commissioners constituted the chief executive body and provincial head of the kingdom's government. The commission began with uninstallation of Krishnaraja Wodeyar III as King in 1831 and ended with investing Chamaraja Wadiyar X as the new maharaja in 1881.

Coorg province, however, ruled as a "non-regulation" province under Mysore Commission, would never again return to its Coorg rajas and would remain part of Madras Presidency until India's independence from the British crown, after which it was absorbed into Mysore State and became a district. After Mysore Commission was dissolved, a new Chief Commissioner of Coorg was appointed.

== History ==
After the death of Tipu at the end of the Fourth Anglo-Mysore War in 1799, the Mysore throne was restored to the Wadiyar dynasty under a regency. The hereditary Wadiyar prince Krishnaraja Wodeyar III was an infant and could not be installed on the throne. In his stead, his adoptive grandmother Maharani Lakshmi Devi reigned over the kingdom as Queen Regent, with Tipu's prime minister Purnaiah as her own royal adviser and dewan. The regency, referred to as Lakshmi Vilas Sannidhana, lasted until 1810 when she died. In two years' time, Purnaiah died, too, in 1812, at about the time the young prince attained the age of majority. He was inducted as the maharaja of Mysore by Arthur Wellesley who had defeated Tipu in 1799.

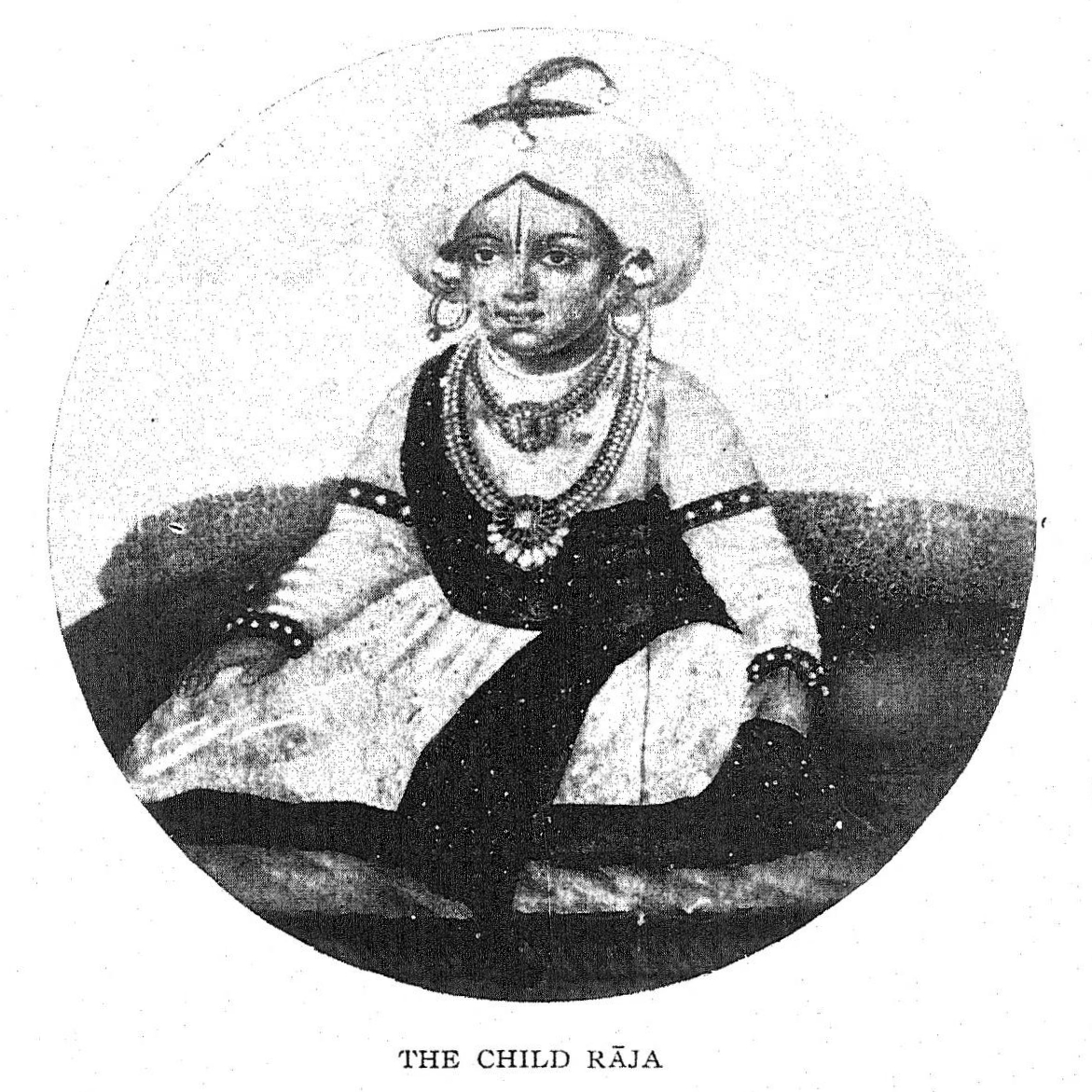
The young infant prince Krishnaraja Wadiyar III

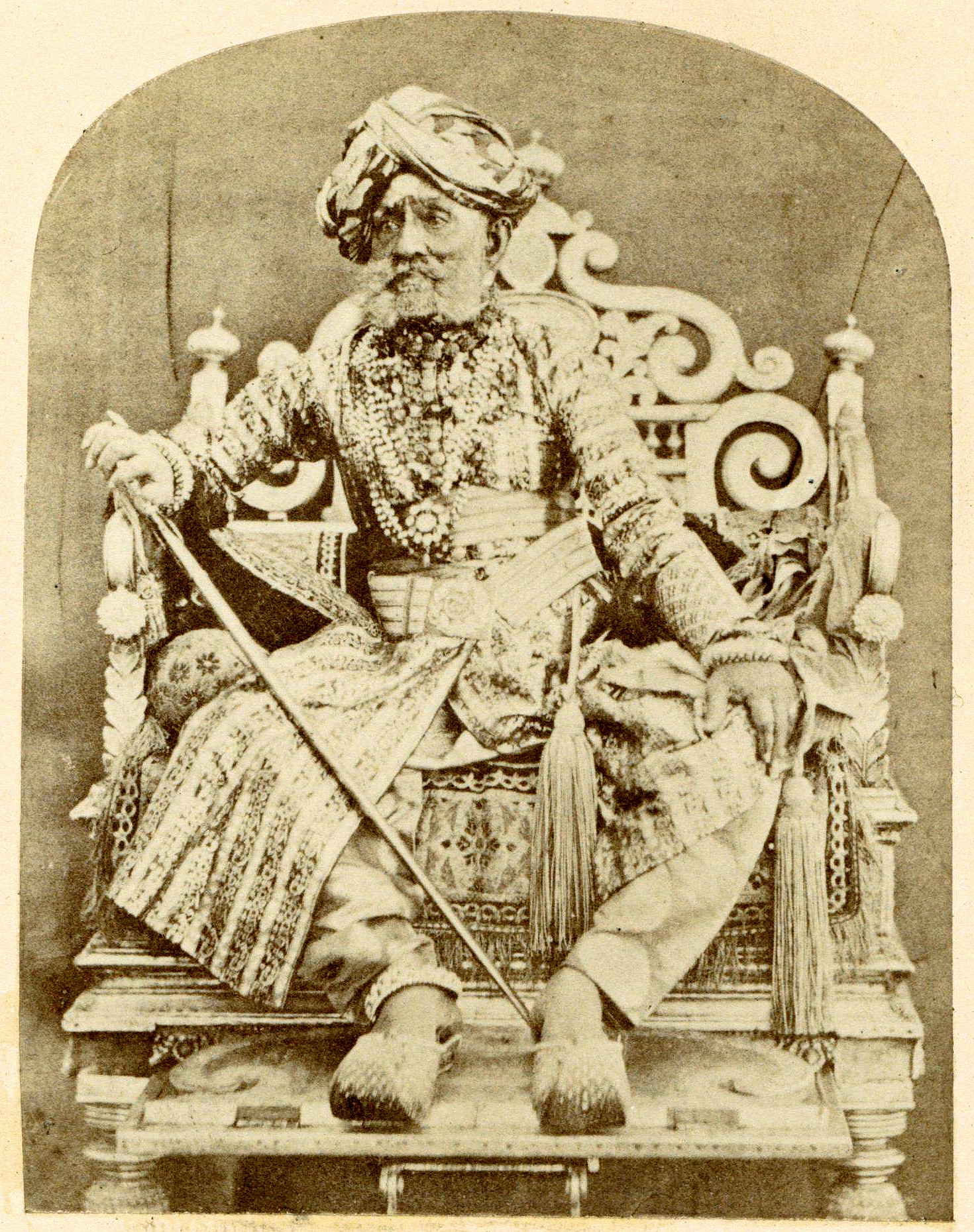
An aged Krishnaraja Wadiyar III, the epicentre for the institution of the Commissioners' Rule

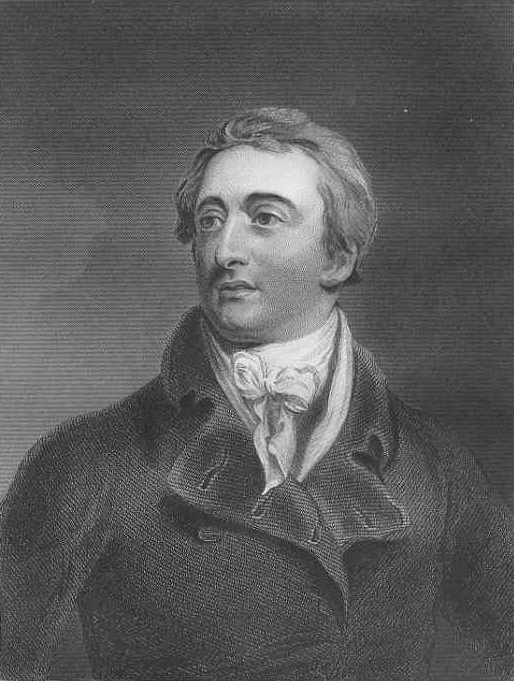
William Bentinck, the governor general of India who placed Mysore under the Commission Rule

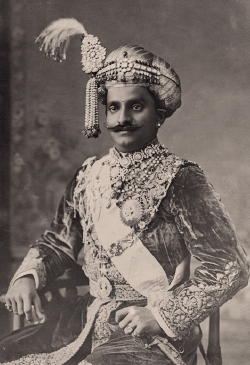
The newly installed Maharaja of Mysore Chamaraja Wadiyar X at the end of the Mysore Commission

According to British accounts, in around 1830, groups of peasants and locals in the village of Nagar (in present-day Shimoga district) in the north of the kingdom are said to have protested against the despotic land revenues imposed during the reign of Krishnaraja Wodeyar III, resulting in the Nagar revolt, leading to some hundreds of deaths. Taking note of this, William Bentinck, the governor-general of India, asked for a committee to be formed to investigate the incident.

A committee was then formed, consisting of Thomas Hawker, J M Macleod, William Morison, and Mark Cubbon, the latter two of whom would later on be appointed as commissioners. The committee, after a year-long investigation and based on oral testimonies and sources some of which might have been unreliable, criticised the maharaja's style of rule and personal character and made no remarks particularly on the taxation. After the report was submitted, Bentinck decreed that a commission shall administer the state. Eventually, a commission was formed and came into power on 19 October 1831. Later, it came to knowledge that reports of misgovernance were grossly exaggerated. This entire affair came to be seen as British usurpation of the kingdom under Bentinck.

== Commissioners' rule ==
The commissioners' rule began with John Briggs and his deputy, Lushington, from Madras Presidency. Briggs' appointment was not seen favourably by Madras Presidency. Owing to heated squabbles between the two, they were replaced by William Morison, a Scottish general from Madras Artillery. In 1834, Morison resigned to become a member of the Supreme Council of India. Mark Cubbon succeeded him.

Cubbon became the longest-serving commissioner of Mysore, for nearly three decades. Cubbon Park and the Cubbon Park Metro Station in Bangalore are named after him. He was succeeded by Lewin Bowring.

During both Cubbon and Bowring's commissions, Krishnaraja Wodeyar III appealed for a return of power—an idea to which both commissioners were opposed during their respective administrations, and the deposed king died a dejected man.

Bowring was succeeded by Richard Meade, a British Indian Army officer. During his commission, Meade himself mentored Yuvaraja Chamaraja Wadiyar X, the young prince of Mysore, for his future role as Maharaja, and the two would often correspond.

=== List of commissioners ===
No.	Chief commissioner	Portrait	Tenure	Appointing Governor-General
1	John Briggs		October 1831 - May 1834	William Bentinck
2	William Morison		May 1834 - June 1834	William Bentinck
3	Mark Cubbon		June 1834 - 1861	William Bentinck
4	Lewin Bowring		1861 - 1870	Charles Canning
5	Richard Meade		1870 - 1881	Richard Bourke

== Dissolution ==
In 1881, Chamaraja Wadiyar X attained the age of majority, making him eligible to take over as the ruler of the kingdom. Consequently, the presiding Governor-General George Robinson devised an instrument of rendition, inducting the prince as King. With this, the Commission was dissolved and the kingdom would return to the Wadiyars—for one last time, until it would be ceded into the Republic of India in 1950.

With this, the Commission was dissolved, a Mysore Resident represented British India at Mysore Palace, and a separate Chief Commissionership was formed for Coorg.
