= Inverarity (surname) =

Inverarity has been the surname of various people:

- Alison Inverarity (born 1970), Australian high jumper
- Don Inverarity, Canadian politician
- John Inverarity (born 1944), Australian cricketer
- Robert Bruce Inverarity (born 1909), American artist
- John Duncan Inverarity (1847 – 1923), British-Indian Barrister
- Jonathan Duncan Inverarity (1812/1813 – 1882), Anglo-Indian civil servant (father of above)
- Pierce Inverarity, a fictional character from the novel The Crying of Lot 49
