= C. T. Mudaliar =

Indian botanist and civil servant

Diwan Bahadur Kanchipuram Thiruvenkata Mudaliar

Chief Commissioner of Coorg Province
- In office March 1949 – 1950
- Preceded by: Ketoli Chengappa
- Succeeded by: Daya Singh Bedi

Personal details
- Born: 1901 or 1902 Kanchipuram, Madras Presidency, British India
- Spouse: Yeshodha
- Education: University of Madras
- Profession: botanist, civil servant

Diwan Bahadur Kanchipuram Thiruvenkata Mudaliar (born 1901 or 1902) was an Indian botanist and civil servant who served as Chief Commissioner of Coorg Province from 1949 to 1950. He was the second Indian to hold the post after Ketoli Chengappa. He was in charge when Coorg was inducted as a Part-C state of the Indian Union on 26 January 1950.

== Personal life ==
Mudaliar was born to C. Ramanuja Mudaliar in the town of Conjeevaram (now Kanchipuram) in about 1901 or 1902. He married Tilakavathi daughter of Judge C. Jambulinga mudaliar. The couple had two sons, C. T. Gopalakrishnan and C. T. Radhakrishnan and a daughter, Rama Bai Jagadesan.

Later he married Radha Bai (off sister of Tilakavathi) and the couple had a daughter Devi Choudrani Varadarajan

== As Chief Commissioner of Coorg ==
Mudaliar became Chief Commissioner of Coorg in March 1949. During his tenure, Mudaliar inaugurated Coorg's first arts and science college at Mercara.
