= List of chief commissioners of Coorg Province =

Below is a list of chief commissioners of Coorg Province:

#	Name	Assumed office	Left office	Remarks^{[a]}
1	Lewin Bentham Bowring	24 February 1869	21 February 1870	
2	Sir Richard John Meade	21 February 1870	5 June 1876	
3	Charles Burslem Saunders	5 June 1876	1 April 1878	
4	Sir James Davidson Gordon	1 April 1878	8 June 1883	
5	Sir James Broadwood Lyall	8 June 1883	15 January 1889	
6	Sir Oliver St John	15 January 1889	1 June 1891	
7	Sir Harry North Dalrymple Prendergast	1 June 1891	16 April 1892	Acting
8	Philip Durham Henderson	16 April 1892	20 February 1895	
9	William Lee-Warner	20 February 1895	18 September 1895	
10	Sir William Mackworth Young	18 September 1895	7 December 1896	
11	Donald Robertson	7 December 1896	5 November 1903	
12	Sir James Austin Bourdillon	5 November 1903	22 November 1905	
13	Sir Stuart Mitford Fraser	22 November 1905	26 August 1910	
14	Sir Hugh Daly	26 August 1910	7 April 1916	
15	Henry Venn Cobb	7 April 1916	8 March 1920	
16	Sir William Pell Barton	8 March 1920	29 June 1925	
17	Sir Steuart Edmund Pears	29 June 1925	23 June 1930	
18	Richard John Charles Burke	23 June 1930	5 May 1933	
18	Charles Terence Chichele Plowden	5 May 1933	9 December 1937	
18	John de la Hay Gordon	9 December 1937	1 July 1940	
19	J. W. Pritchard	1 July 1940	26 April 1943	
20	Diwan Bahadur Ketoli Chengappa	26 April 1943	1949	
21	C. T. Mudaliar	1949	1952	
22	Daya Singh Bedi	1952	1956	

== Notes ==
a The Acting Governors were appointed for a temporary period until the post of Governor was filled.

== Sources ==
- Rulers of Coorg
