= William Havelock (disambiguation) =

William Havelock was a cavalry officer.

William Havelock may also refer to:

- William Henry Havelock, civil servant

== See also ==
- William Havelock Ramsden
