= John de la Hay Gordon =

British army officer, administrator and diplomat

Lieutenant-Colonel John de la Hay Gordon

British Resident to the Kingdom of Mysore
- In office 9 December 1937 – 1942
- Preceded by: Charles Terence Chichele Plowden
- Succeeded by: Denholm de Montalt Fraser

Chief Commissioner of Coorg Province
- In office 9 December 1937 – 1 July 1940
- Preceded by: Charles Terence Chichele Plowden
- Succeeded by: J. W. Pritchard

Personal details
- Born: 3 March 1887 Ireland
- Died: 22 November 1959 (aged 72) Mabane, Swaziland

Lientenant-Colonel John de la Hay Gordon, CSI CIE OBE MC (30 March 1887 – 22 December 1959) was a British army officer, administrator, and diplomat who served as Resident to the Mysore Kingdom from 1937 to 1942 and Chief Commissioner of Coorg Province from 1937 to 1940.

== Early life and education ==
Gordon was born on 30 March 1887 to Alexander Hamilton Miller Haven Gordon and Ada Austen Eyre. He was educated at Rossall School at Fleetwood in Lancashire, United Kingdom and the Royal Military College at Sandhurst. Gordon joined the army in 1906 and was commissioned into the Royal Irish Regiment. His brothers were politician Sir Alexander Gordon and Sir Eyre Gordon.

== Army ==
Gordon was transferred to the Indian Army in 1908 and was appointed political officer of the Government of India in 1911. Gordon fought in the First World War and was mentioned in despatches twice. In 1936, Gordon was appointed military Governor-General of the Western Indian States Agency. On his retirement from the army in 1937, Gordon was appointed resident to the Mysore kingdom. While resident, Gordon also held office as the Chief Commissioner of the neighbouring Coorg Province.

On 1 July 1940, Coorg was separated from Mysore and a new Chief Commissioner was appointed to administer the province. The first Chief Commissioner to hold independent charge was J. W. Pritchard. Gordon remained Resident of Mysore till the end of his term in 1942.

== Honours ==
Gordon was awarded the Military Cross in 1916. He was made an officer of the Order of the British Empire in 1918, Companion of the Order of the Indian Empire in 1937 and Companion of the Order of the Star of India in 1941.

== Family life ==
Gordon married Esme Violet Bevan on 5 October 1920 in Aden. He died on 22 December 1959 at Mabane, Swaziland aged 71.
