= H. P. Jacobs =

H. P. Jacobs may refer to:

- Hedley Powell Jacobs (1904–1989), English–Jamaican author
- Henry P. Jacobs (1825–1899), American legislator and educator
