= Charles Terence Chichele Plowden =

British army officer, military administrator and diplomat

Lieutenant-Colonel Charles Terence Chichele Plowden

British Resident to the Kingdom of Mysore and Chief Commissioner of Coorg Province
- In office 5 May 1933 – 9 December 1937
- Preceded by: R. J. C. Burke
- Succeeded by: John de la Hay Gordon

Personal details
- Born: 6 February 1883 Shimla, Bengal Presidency, India
- Died: 13 July 1956 (aged 73) Wandsworth, London, England

Lieutenant-Colonel Charles Terence Chichele Plowden, CIE (6 February 1883 - 13 July 1956) was a British army officer, military administrator and diplomat who served as political agent of the Baluchistan and Resident and Chief Commissioner of Coorg from 1933 to 1937.

== Early life and education ==
Plowden was born in Shimla on 6 February 1883 to Lieutenant Trevor John Chichele Plowden, a British army officer of the Punjab Commission. He was educated at Cheltenham College and the Royal Military College, Sandhurst. After passing out on 27 August 1902, his name was added to the Unattached List of the Indian Army, until he was in October posted to the Bengal command.

== Career ==
Plowden was appointed to the Political Department and served as Superintending Assistant Commissioner of the North West Frontier Province (1908–09), Political Assistant (1909), Assistant Commissioner, Dera Ismail Khan (1909) and political agent to the Baluchistan States (1920). In 1933, Plowden was appointed Resident to the Mysore Kingdom and thus, automatically became Chief Commissioner of Coorg Province. That very year, Plowden was made a Companion of the Order of the Indian Empire.

== Later life ==
Plowden retired in 1938 and served as a Press Reader in the British Embassy in Moscow during 1944-45. Plowden died on 13 July 1956.
