= J. W. Pritchard =

Assistant Magistrate

Joseph William Pritchard

Chief Commissioner of Coorg Province
- In office 1 July 1940 – 26 April 1943
- Preceded by: John de la Hay Gordon
- Succeeded by: Ketoli Chengappa

Personal details
- Born: 5 August 1903 Shrewsbury, England
- Died: 13 January 1963 (aged 59) Chalfont St Giles, Buckinghamshire

Joseph William Pritchard (5 August 1903 – 13 January 1963) was a British civil servant of the Indian Civil Service and an administrator who served as the Chief Commissioner of Coorg Province from 1940 to 1943.

== Early life ==
Pritchard was educated at the Newport Grammar School and Trinity College, Cambridge. On graduation, Pritchard wrote the Indian civil service exams and qualified.

== Career ==
Pritchard joined the Indian Civil Service on 25 October 1927 as Assistant Magistrate and Collector in the Madras Presidency. After serving in various appointments at different stations, in November 1939, Pritchard was appointed Commissioner of Coorg Province and posted to Mercara. As Commissioner, Pritchard was the highest British official in Coorg and reported to the Chief Commissioner of Coorg who was the British Resident to the Kingdom of Mysore and based in the city of Bangalore.

On 1 July 1940, Pritchard was promoted to Chief Commissioner and was given independent charge of Coorg. By this action, Coorg's administrative links with Mysore were severed. Pritchard served as the first independent Chief Commissioner of Coorg till 1943, when he was appointed District Collector of Tanjore district in 1943. Pritchard served in Tanjore district from 16 February 1943 to 22 April 1944.
