= Ketoli Chengappa =

Indian administrator

Diwan Bahadur Ketolira Chengappa C.I.E.

Chief Commissioner of Coorg Province
- In office 26 April 1943 – March 1949
- Preceded by: J. W. Pritchard
- Succeeded by: C. T. Mudaliar

Personal details
- Born: 3 March 1878
- Died: 1963 (aged 84–85)
- Education: University of Madras

Dewan Bahadur Ketolira Chengappa, C.I.E. (1878–1963) was an Indian civil servant and administrator who served as the Chief Commissioner of Coorg Province from 1943 to 1949.

== Early life and education ==
Chengappa was born on 3 March 1878 to Ketolira Muddaiah (worked as a village official) & Bolliavva from Yavakapadi Village, Kabinakad, Napoklu. He completed his matriculation in the year 1893. Thereafter, he went on graduate from University of Madras. Later on he cleared the Indian Civil Service (ICS), the elite higher civil service of the British Empire in British India.

== Career ==
Chengappa joined the services as a parpathigar in 1909 and rose to become the Assistant Commissioner in 1916. He became the first Indian to be appointed as a District Magistrate by the British in 1921. After his tenure as Commissioner of Coorg in 1935, he was appointed by the British as the Chief of National War Front in Coorg in 1942. Subsequently, he was elevated to the position of Chief Commissioner of Coorg Province from 26 April 1943 – March 1949 and then titled Diwan Bahadur.

For his outstanding service, Chengappa was awarded a series of titles by the British, including one as Dewan Bahadur and the title of C.I.E (Companion of the Order of the Indian Empire) in the 1946 Birthday Honours. He was also made an honorary Lieutenant in 1923, resigning in 1928; this might be considered as a prized post offered in Kodagu by the British in the official corps of the territorial force.

Chengappa helped set up the Indian Coffee Cess Committee in 1920's and enabled all British-run estates to form a private consortium called "Consolidated Coffee". In 1936, the Indian Cess Committee aided the creation of the Indian Coffee Board and sparked the birth of the celebrated India Coffee House chain, later run by worker co-operatives. With its liveried staff and old world charm, it spawned a coffee revolution across the subcontinent that has lasted for decades.

== Post-Independence ==
In 1947, when India obtained freedom, Chengappa hosted the Indian tri-colour flag in Mercara fort and brought down the Union jack flag during the ceremony in the then Coorg province. He was the last Chief Commissioner of Coorg and the only one of Indian origin during the British Raj, as Englishmen held this position before him.

== Personal life ==
Chengappa's son Captain K. C. Medappa, an alumnus of Bishop Cotton Boys' School, Bangalore, was an officer in the Frontier Force Regiment who was killed in action on 16 December 1941 during the Malayan Campaign.

Chengappa died in the year 1963 at the age of 85.

== See also ==
- List of Chief Commissioners of Coorg
