= Thomas Pycroft =

British administrator and civil servant

Sir Thomas Pycroft KCSI
- Born: 4 December 1807; Hampstead, Middlesex, United Kingdom
- Died: 29 January 1892 (aged 84)
- Occupation: civil servant

Sir Thomas Pycroft KCSI (4 December 1807 – 29 January 1892) was a British administrator and civil servant who served as a member of the Madras Legislative Council from 1862 to 1867.

== Early life ==
Thomas Pycroft was born in the parish of St John, Hampstead, Middlesex to barrister Thomas Pycroft and his wife Mary Pycroft on 4 December 1807. He was the elder brother of British writer James Pycroft. He was schooled privately and at Bath Grammar School and graduated M.A. from Trinity College, Oxford in 1829. On completion of his education, he was offered a "writership" by the President of the Board of Control of the British East India Company.

== Career ==
Pycroft arrived in Madras in August 1829 and served, initially, as a writer and then, in the revenue and judicial departments in South Arcot from 1829 to 1839 when he returned to the United Kingdom. In 1843, Pycroft came back to India after a three-year hiatus and was transferred to the Madras secretariat.

Pycroft was initially appointed Sub-Secretary and then, promoted to Secretary of the Revenue Department in 1845. The very same year, he was appointed acting Tamil translator to the Madras government. Pycroft became Chief Secretary in 1855 and served from 1855 till 1862 when he nominated to the Madras Legislative Council. Pycroft served as a member of the council for five terms from 1862 to 1867.

== Death and family ==
Pycroft died at Folkestone on 29 January 1892 at the age of 84. His eldest son, Henry Thomas Pycroft (1842–1909), was the father of Auckland ornithologist Arthur Pycroft (1875–1971).

== Honours ==
In the 1866 Birthday Honours, Pycroft was made a Knight Commander of the Order of the Star of India. In Madras, the street in which he lived was named Pycroft's Road in his honour.
