= Henry Napier Bruce Erskine =

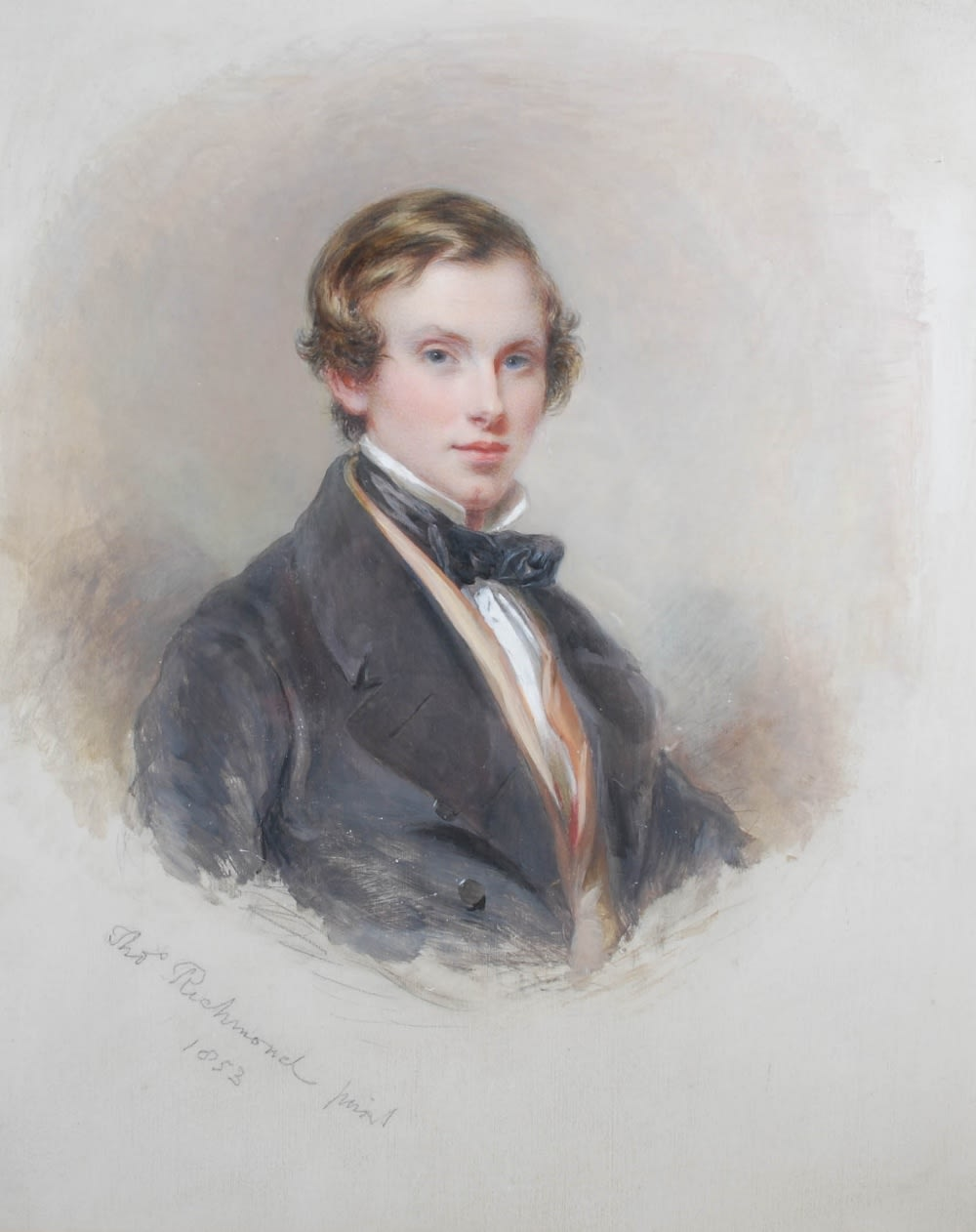
1848 watercolour by Thomas Richmond – portrait of Henry Napier Bruce Erskine

Henry Napier Bruce Erskine, CSI (7 September 1831 – 4 December 1893) was a member of the Indian Civil Service.

A son of William Erskine, he arrived in Bombay in 1853. He became collector and magistrate of Nasik in 1869, commissioner of the northern division of Bombay from 1877 to 1879, and Commissioner in Sind from 1879 to 1887. He was appointed a CSI in 1887.

In retirement, he died at Cran Hill, Great Malvern, Worcestershire in 1893.

Government offices
Preceded by Francis Dawes Melville	Commissioner in Sind; 1879–1887	Succeeded by Charles Bradley Pritchard
