= Thomas Henry Thornton =

English judge in India and biographer (1832–1913)

Thomas Henry Thornton CSI (1832 – 10 March 1913) was an English Indian Civil Servant, judge and author of two notable British Raj biographies.

== Biography ==
Thomas Henry Thornton was born in 1832, the son of a Times journalist, and educated at Merchant Taylors' School and read Classics and Modern history at St John's College, Oxford, at which he was afterwards a fellow.

In 1855, Thornton entered the Indian Civil Service in the last few years of the East India Company as one of the first officers selected by competition. He was posted to the Punjab and played a small but distinguished role in the Indian Rebellion of 1857, noted in Roberts Forty-one Years in India. Thornton had been returning from a visit to Philour fort, north of Ludhiana, as part of his work for George Ricketts, the Deputy Commissioner, when he came upon Indian soldiers of that fort and Jalandhar (Jullunder) marching in revolt on Ludhiana. Rather than return to the fort for protection, he rode on, cut the cables of a bridge of boats over the Sutlej River, and continued to Ludhiana to raise the alarm.

In 1864, at the comparatively young age of 32, he was appointed Secretary to the Punjab Government, a post he held for 12 years. He filled Charles Umpherston Aitchison's foreign secretary post during the former's furloughs back to the UK. Thornton assumed responsibility for the organisation of the 1877 Delhi Durbar, the success of which, together with his service to date, led to the conferring on him of the award of Companion of the Order of the Star of India. However Thornton and Aitchison were both identified as proteges of John Lawrence, 1st Baron Lawrence, the Viceroy of India from 1864 to 1869, whose policies were opposed by Robert Bulwer-Lytton, 1st Earl of Lytton, Viceroy from 1876 to 1880. Aitchison transferred to Burma, and Thornton was passed over for promotion into Aitchison's vacant role. He now became a judge in the Punjab Chief Court and a member of the Legislative Council, retiring in 1881 after the completion of 25-years of colonial service, at the very early age of 49.

In his long retirement, he wrote two well-regarded biographies of key British India figures, Robert Groves Sandeman and Richard John Meade. He was a member and sometime chairman of the Wandsworth magistrates bench, and vice-president of The Asiatic Society at the time of his death.

== Archives ==
A selection of Thornton's letters is held at the Cadbury Research Library, University of Birmingham.

== Works ==
- General Sir Richard Meade and the Feudatory States of Central and Southern India (1898)
- Colonel Sir Robert Sandeman: His Life and Work on Our Indian Frontier (1895)
- Historical Note, in Goulding, Henry Raynor & Thornton, Thomas Henry, Old Lahore: Reminiscences of a Resident (1924)
