= Daya Singh Bedi =

British Indian Army officer and diplomat (1899–1975)

Ambassador Col. Baba Daya Singh Bedi

Chief Commissioner of Coorg State
- In office 1951–1956
- Preceded by: C. T. Mudaliar
- Succeeded by: Position abolished

Indian Ambassador to Australia
- In office 1948–1951

Indian Civil Service
- In office 1937–1948

Indian Political Service
- In office 1928–1937

Military British Indian Army
- In office 1921–1928

Personal details
- Born: 27 January 1899 Kallar, Rawalpindi
- Died: 1975 (aged 75–76)
- Spouse: Bibi Anand Kaur Dhall
- Children: Tika Aridaman Singh Bedi, Bibi Manmohini Kumari, Bibi Sheilla Kumari
- Profession: Military, Civil Service and Indian Foreign Service

Ambassador Lieutenant-Colonel Baba Daya Singh Bedi (1899–1975) was an Indian diplomat, Civil Servant and a Cavalry officer in the British Indian Army with the 6th Duke of Connaught's Own Lancers (Watson's Horse). After the partition of India he served as India's First High Commissioner to Australia from 1948 to 1951 and Chief Commissioner of Coorg State from 1951 to 1956.

== Personal life ==
Daya Singh Bedi (1899–1975) was born to Raja Sir Gurbaksh Singh Bedi K.B.E., Kt., C.i.E., (1862–1946) an extremely influential Sikh spiritual and political leader who was the direct descendant, in the fifteenth place of Sri Guru Nanak, a member of the Legislative Council of the Punjab Province (British India) and the Raja of Kallar (Jagir) near Rawalpindi (now in Pakistan).

Daya Singh Bedi was married to Bibi Anand Kaur Dhall.

== Career ==
Bedi was commissioned as a second lieutenant in July 1921 as a King's Commissioned Indian Officer (KCIO) and rose to the rank of lieutenant before he was transferred in September 1928 to the Indian Political Service. He was subsequently given the honorary rank of lieutenant colonel in 1947 during his military assignment in Nepal.

He achieved promotions from 1928 till 1937 as Political Agent (1931, Southern States and Central India) / Undersecretary (1932, States of Western India) / Assistant Commissioner in the Princely states of Rajputana (1933), Travancore (1935) and Orissa Province (1937). Bedi also had responsibilities inherited with his title in Pashtunistan and the Punjab region and he combined his professional and personal roles after the 1935 Quetta earthquake. He served with distinction as an officer of the Indian Civil Service (British India) in the regions where his family patronage existed and had a record of reconstruction and administrative efficiency in the aftermath of the earthquake. Bedi was the Political Resident in Quetta-Pishin District till 1938, Political Resident of Loralai, Balochistan, Pakistan, from 1939 to 1941, Political Resident and Deputy Commissioner of Hazara, North-West Frontier Province from 1942 to 1944, Political Agent Kurram in 1945, Political Agent Orissa States from 1946 to 1947, Regional Commissioner Rajputana in 1948.

At Indian independence, Bedi joined the newly formed Ministry of External Affairs and Commonwealth Relations which was later renamed Ministry of External Affairs (India) in the Indian Foreign Service department. His negotiation was instrumental in the amicable division of weapons, equipment, regiments and rights of the Gurkhas in military service and he was a signatory to the Britain-India-Nepal Tripartite Agreement. The following year in 1948 he was appointed as the Indian High Commissioner (Commonwealth) and Plenipotentiary to Australia and served till 1951. On his return to India, Bedi was appointed as Chief Commissioner of Coorg State where he served till 1956 when the province was dissolved and merged with the neighbouring Mysore State.

== Death ==
On retirement, Baba Daya Singh Bedi studied Sufi poetry. He died in 1975.
