= Richard John Charles Burke =

Lieutenant-Colonel Sir Richard John Charles Burke (5 May 1878 – 31 August 1960) was a British military officer and member of the Indian Political Service. He was British Resident in Mysore and Chief Commissioner of Coorg from 1930 to 1933.
