= Noël B. Livingston =

Jamaican politician, judge, author, and genealogist

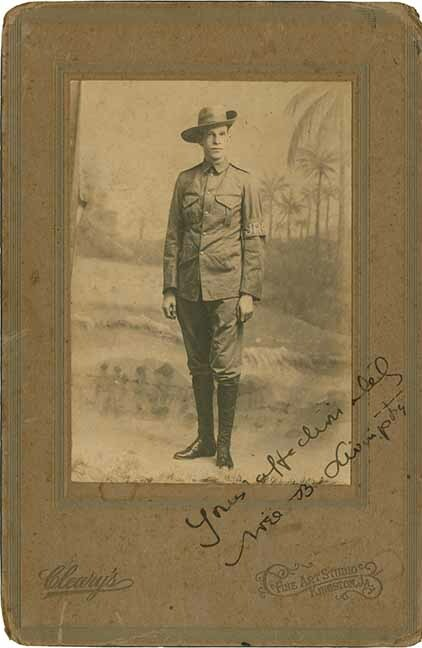
Noel B. Livingston, private of section IV, B. Company, Jamaica Reserve Regiment

Sir Noël Brooks Livingston (9 November 1882 – 17 January 1954) was a Jamaican politician, judge, author, and genealogist.

== Career ==
Livingston was a solicitor by training and a member of the Supreme Court of Jamaica. He was an early contributor to the Jamaican Historical Review (established 1945), the journal of the Jamaican Historical Society which was established in 1943.

Livingston was the president of the Legislative Council of Jamaica from 1945 to 1952. He was knighted in the 1941 New Year Honours.

== Family ==
In 1924, Livingston married Amy, Lady Cuffe (1883–1945); she was the widow of Surgeon-General Sir Charles Cuffe (1842–1915). In 1934, the Livingstons went to New Zealand for a holiday and for him to observe the court system. They met with family in Auckland; Livingston had the same maternal grandparents—Francis and Eleanor Harris—as Minna Pycroft (née Harris), the wife of Arthur Pycroft.

== Selected publications ==
- Sketch Pedigrees of Some of the Early Settlers in Jamaica &c. Educational Supply Company, Kingston, 1909.
- "Records of Jamaica", Caribbeana, Vol. 1 (1910):135
