= Francis Dawes Melville =

Francis Dawes Melville (20 August 1836 – 9 February 1881) was a British civil servant who served in Bombay during British rule. He was the Commissioner in Sind from 1877 to 1879.

Melville was born in Camberwell, London, the fourth son of Rev. Henry Melville. He entered the Bombay Civil Service of the East India Company on the last day of 1855. He died in Cairo in 1881, aged 46.

Government offices
| Preceded by William Merewether | Commissioner in Sind; 1877–1879 | Succeeded by Henry Napier Bruce Erskine |
