= Samuel Mansfield =

British diplomat (1815–1893)

Samuel Mansfield CSI (1815 – 12 December 1893) was a member of the Bombay Civil Service from 1834 to 1872.

Mansfield was the brother of General William Mansfield, 1st Baron Sandhurst, who was Commander-in-Chief of India from 1865 to 1870. He was educated at Haileybury.

He was the Commissioner in Sind from 1862 to March 1867. During his tenure, a separate Judicial Commissioner was appointed for Sind, thus relieving him of this role. He was a member of the senior council of Bombay from 1867 to 1872.

Mansfield was appointed a Companion of the Order of the Star of India in the 1866 Birthday Honours.

Government offices
Preceded by Jonathan Duncan Inverarity	Commissioner in Sind; 1867–1877	Succeeded by William Merewether
