= Jamaican Historical Society =

Historical society

- Formation: 26 May 1943
- Founded at: Kingston, Jamaica
- Purpose: "To preserve historical evidence of buildings, artefacts and documents wherever possible in Jamaica."
- Website: jamaicanhistoricalsociety.org.jm

The Jamaican Historical Society is a local history society in Jamaica. The society publishes a journal, the Jamaican Historical Review, as well as a Bulletin.

== History ==
The Jamaican Historical Society (occasionally also referred to as the Jamaica Historical Society) was established in 1943 at the offices of the British Council in Jamaica, by C. B. Lewis, H. Paget, H. E. Vendryes and J. G. Young. A subsequent meeting was called of persons interested in Jamaican history, and they agreed to elect Noël B. Livingston as president. The constitution and by-laws were ratified in January 1944.

B. W. Higman has commented that the establishment of the society in 1943 "may be seen as part of the explosion of expressive culture that occurred in the island in the 1930s, associated with the movement towards self-government." In its early years, it promoted local study groups, made regular broadcasts on the Jamaica Broadcasting Station (ZQI). From 1945, it published the Jamaican Historical Review, and from 1952 it published a Bulletin. Initially, the society's publications were funded by the British Council.

In the years before the University College of the West Indies in 1948, the society was dominated by the local and expatriate middle class of Jamaica. No West Indian academics published in the Review until after Jamaican independence from the United Kingdom in 1962. In 1967, Jamaican sociologist Orlando Patterson commented that "one looks in vain throughout the volumes of the Jamaican Historical Review for any paper of significance on the negro population of the island... either during slavery or afterwards." Higman said that the comment was "too sweeping" but "not far off the mark."

After the death of the long-term editor of the Review in 1962, the journal was relaunched in 1964 with an editorial board that announced its intention of making it "an academic journal of Caribbean history in its widest sense." This was short-lived as the launch of the Journal of Caribbean History by the Department of History at the University of the West Indies (UWI) in 1970 displaced the academic turn of the Review. In 1971, the editorial of the journal noted that it would now "revert to its primarily Jamaican interests." Although amateur history returned to its pages, the new editor was David Buisseret, an English academic at UWI. He was followed by Carl Campbell, a Jamaican UWI academic. By the 1980s, the amateur contribution had declined yet again, but this "was to some extent balanced by history-writing for the society's Bulletin as well as for newspapers and popular magazines."

== Selected publications ==
- Laws, William. (1976) Distinction, Death and Disgrace: Governorship of the Leeward Islands in the early eighteenth century. Jamaican Historical Society, Kingston.

== See also ==
- Jamaica Journal
- Institute of Jamaica
- Jamaica National Heritage Trust
- Jamaica Archives and Records Department
