= Edward John Lake =

British major-general in the royal engineers

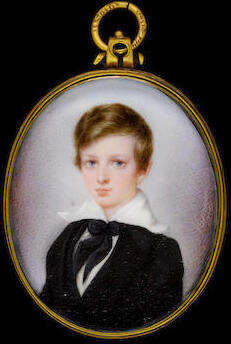
- Lake as a child
- Born: 19 June 1823; Madras
- Died: 7 June 1877 (aged 53)
- Occupation: Major-general in the Royal Engineers

Edward John Lake CSI (19 June 1823 – 7 June 1877) was a British major-general in the Royal Engineers.

== Biography ==
Lake born at Madras on 19 June 1823. He was the son of Edward Lake (d. 1829), major in the Madras engineers, who served with distinction in the Mahratta war of 1817, and was author of ‘Sieges of the Madras Army.’ Sent to England with a sister at an early age, Edward was left an orphan when six years old by the foundering at sea of the ship Guildford, in which his parents with their four younger children were on passage home. He was brought up by his grandfather, Admiral Sir Willoughby Lake, who placed him at a private school at Wimbledon. He afterwards entered the military college of the East India Company at Addiscombe, and passed through the course in three terms instead of the usual four. He obtained a commission as second lieutenant in the Bengal engineers on 11 June 1840. After a year at the royal engineers' establishment at Chatham, he went to India, and was posted to the Bengal sappers and miners at Delhi.

Shortly after his arrival at Delhi, Lake was sent with a company of sappers to suppress an outbreak at Kythul, near Kurnaul. He there made the acquaintance of Henry and John Lawrence, and was employed for a time in road-making under the former. He was promoted lieutenant on 19 February 1844. During the autumn of 1845 he served as a settlement officer in the Umballa district under Major Broadfoot. On the outbreak of the Sikh war in the same year he was ordered to the Sutlej, and joined Lord Hardinge in time to be present at the battle of Moodkee on 20 December, when he had a horse shot under him and was himself severely wounded in the hand. After the battle he was sent to the frontier station of Loodiana, where he strengthened the defences and forwarded troops and supplies to the army in the field. When Sir Harry Smith's camp equipage fell into the hands of the enemy just before the battle of Aliwal, Lake was able to replace it, and received the commendation of the governor-general for his zeal and promptness. He was present at the battle of Aliwal, and received a medal and clasp for his services in the campaign.

On the restoration of peace in March 1846, the trans-Sutlej territory of the Jalundhur Doab was made over to the British as a material guarantee. John Lawrence was appointed commissioner for the newly acquired territory, and Lake was nominated one of his assistants and placed in charge of the Kangra district, with headquarters at Noorpoor, whence he was soon moved to Jalundhur.

In May 1848, when Sir Henry Lawrence, the commissioner of the Punjab, had left India on furlough to England, open hostility was manifested by Mulraj, governor of Mooltan, and his turbulent Sikhs; Patrick Alexander Vans Agnew and Lieutenant Anderson were foully murdered, and the Punjab was in a blaze. Herbert Edwardes, who was in political charge of the Dera Ismail Khan district and nearest to Mooltan, hastily collected a body of Pathans and managed to hold his own against Mulraj. Lake was specially selected as political officer to the nawab of Bahawalpoor, a friendly Mahometan chief, whose territories adjoined the Punjab, and in virtual command of the nawab's troops he co-operated with his old friend Edwardes. He took part on 1 July in the second battle of Suddoosam, close to Mooltan, and for seven months was engaged in the operations for the reduction of Mooltan before it fell. During these stirring times Lake, then only a lieutenant like Edwardes, was in fact commander-in-chief of the Davodpootra army, and although directed to co-operate with Edwardes, and in no way under his orders, he nevertheless magnanimously subordinated himself, and was content to do his utmost to further his friend's plans (Edwardes, A Year in the Punjab). On the fall of Mooltan, Lake was again in the field, and took part in the final victory of Gujerat on 21 February 1849. He accompanied General Gilbert to the Indus in his pursuit of the Afghans, and was present at Rawul Pindee when the Sikh army laid down its arms. The war over, Lake received a medal and two clasps. Going to Batala, he next had charge, under John (afterwards Lord) Lawrence, for two years of the northern portion of the country between the rivers Beas and Ravee. In 1852 he went home on furlough, travelling through Russia, Prussia, Norway, and Sweden. He returned to India in 1854, having been promoted captain on 21 August, and a brevet-major on 22 August for his services in the Punjab campaign. He took up his old charge in the trans-Sutlej province at Kangra as deputy-commissioner. In 1855 he was appointed commissioner of the Jalundhur Doab. When the mutiny broke out in 1857, Lake occupied and secured the fort of Kangra against the rebels, and held it until the mutiny was suppressed. His calmness and resource were a tower of strength to the government throughout the crisis.

In 1860 his health failed, and he was obliged to go to England. He was promoted lieutenant-colonel on 18 February 1861, and in July married the youngest daughter of T. Bewes, esq., of Beaumont, Plymouth. He returned to his post at Jalundhur in the same year. In 1865 he was appointed financial commissioner of the Punjab, and the following year was made a companion of the Star of India. In 1867 ill-health again compelled him to go to England, and subsequently to decline Lord Lawrence's offer of the much-coveted appointment of resident of Hyderabad. He had been promoted colonel on 31 December 1868, and on 1 January 1870 he retired on a pension with the honorary rank of major-general. After he left India the ‘Lake Scholarship’ was founded by public subscription in January 1870 in his honour at the Lahore High School.

About 1855 Lake had come under deep spiritual impressions, and was thenceforth earnestly religious. At home he became honorary secretary of the East London Mission Relief Fund in 1868, and worked hard between 1869 and 1876 as honorary lay secretary of the Church Missionary Society. From April 1871 to June 1874 he was sole editor of the ‘Church Missionary Record,’ and contributed articles to the ‘Church Missionary Intelligencer,’ the ‘Sunday at Home,’ &c. In the summer of 1876 lung disease made it necessary for him to remove from London to Bournemouth, and in the following spring he went to Clifton, where he died on 7 June 1877. He was buried on 13 June 1877 in Long Ashton churchyard, near Clifton. In 1873 he edited the fifth edition of the ‘Church Missionary Atlas,’ and was engaged on another edition at the time of his death. Lake was a man of slight and delicate frame, but of a very cheery and lovable disposition. He had great aptitude for business, and remarkable tact in the management of natives, by whom he was known as Lake Sahib, and was much beloved. Lord Lawrence, Sir Robert Montgomery, and other great Indian administrators had a very high opinion of him. Sir R. Montgomery wrote: ‘The names of Herbert Edwardes, Donald McLeod, and Edward Lake will ever be remembered as examples of the highest type of public servants and devoted friends.’
