= The West Indian Review =

Jamaican magazine

- November 1959
- Editor: Esther Chapman
- Founded: 1934
- Final issue: 1974
- Country: Jamaica
- Based in: Kingston, Jamaica

The West Indian Review was a magazine published in Kingston, Jamaica, from 1934 to 1974. The editor was Esther Chapman. In Spring 1963 the title was changed to the Jamaican and West Indian Review.

== Content ==
The magazine published material in multiple languages reflecting its objectives of forging links between Caribbean states in anticipation of a political union, and of a broad cultural interchange between the Caribbean and Central America. Content included fiction, poetry, and non-fiction historical and ethnographic material.

== Criticism ==
The West Indian Review did not always fit with the prevailing nationalist sentiment in other Jamaican literature and has been described by Carl Wade as "on the wrong side of history where matters of national development were concerned".
