= Arthur Pycroft =

New Zealand naturalist, scholar, historian, conservationist and taxidermist

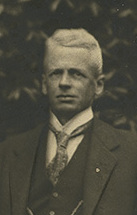
- Pycroft in 1934
- Born: Arthur Thomas Pycroft; 3 September 1875; Auckland, New Zealand
- Died: 8 November 1971 (aged 96); Auckland, New Zealand
- Resting place: Purewa Cemetery
- Known for: Ornithology; Private library
- Spouse: Minna Monica Vere Harris (m. 1909; died 1970)
- Relatives: Thomas Pycroft (grandfather); James Pycroft (great-uncle)

Arthur Thomas Pycroft (3 September 1875 – 8 November 1971) was a New Zealand naturalist and collector, known especially for his ornithological work. Pycroft worked for the New Zealand Railways Department and became a senior manager, but he retired young after receiving a large inheritance. This gave him more time for his real passion as a naturalist and ornithologist. He organised expeditions, mostly to islands off the coast of the North Island, with a focus on birds and plants. He grew rare plants at his large property in the Auckland suburb of Saint Heliers. Another of his interests was collecting rare books. When his library was put up for sale 40 years after his death, it was dubbed the "last great private library" in New Zealand. Pycroft held membership with the Auckland Institute at Auckland Museum for 75 years and was the organisation's president in 1935–36.

== Early life and family ==
Pycroft was born in 1875 in Auckland. His mother was Sarah Pycroft (née Alderton) and his father was Henry T. Pycroft (1842–1909), a teacher and the eldest son of Sir Thomas Pycroft (1807–1892). His grandfather had been a member of the Madras Legislative Council from 1862 to 1867. Henry Pycroft had come to New Zealand in 1866, and Sarah and he married at Wanganui in December 1872.

In January 1876, Pycroft's father had a position confirmed at a school in Pōkeno in Waikato, but by May 1876 he became assistant master at the City West school in Auckland. In 1878, his father was master at Ponsonby Grammar School, and from 1883 to 1886, he was headmaster at the Church of England Grammar School in Parnell which Arthur attended as a pupil. Arthur's secondary education was at Auckland Grammar School in the adjacent suburb of Epsom.

Pycroft's father died in February 1909. On 27 November 1909, Pycroft married Minna Monica Vere Harris (known as Minna) at Christ Church in Whangārei. Her father, J. Duncan Harris, was district manager for the railways at Whangārei. They had one son, Lansley Thomas James Pycroft, born on 4 October 1914 at their Parnell residence. Minna Pycroft was second cousin to Noël B. Livingston (his maternal grandparents—Francis and Eleanor Harris—were her paternal grandparents) who was a member of the Supreme Court of Jamaica; the Livingstons visited the Pycrofts in 1934.

== Professional life ==
Aged 15, Pycroft started working for the New Zealand Railways Department. He worked his way up and gained the rank of station master in the Bay of Islands. In Auckland, he gained a senior management position.

He retired from work in 1925 at the age of 50 after receiving a substantial inheritance from England.

== Interests ==
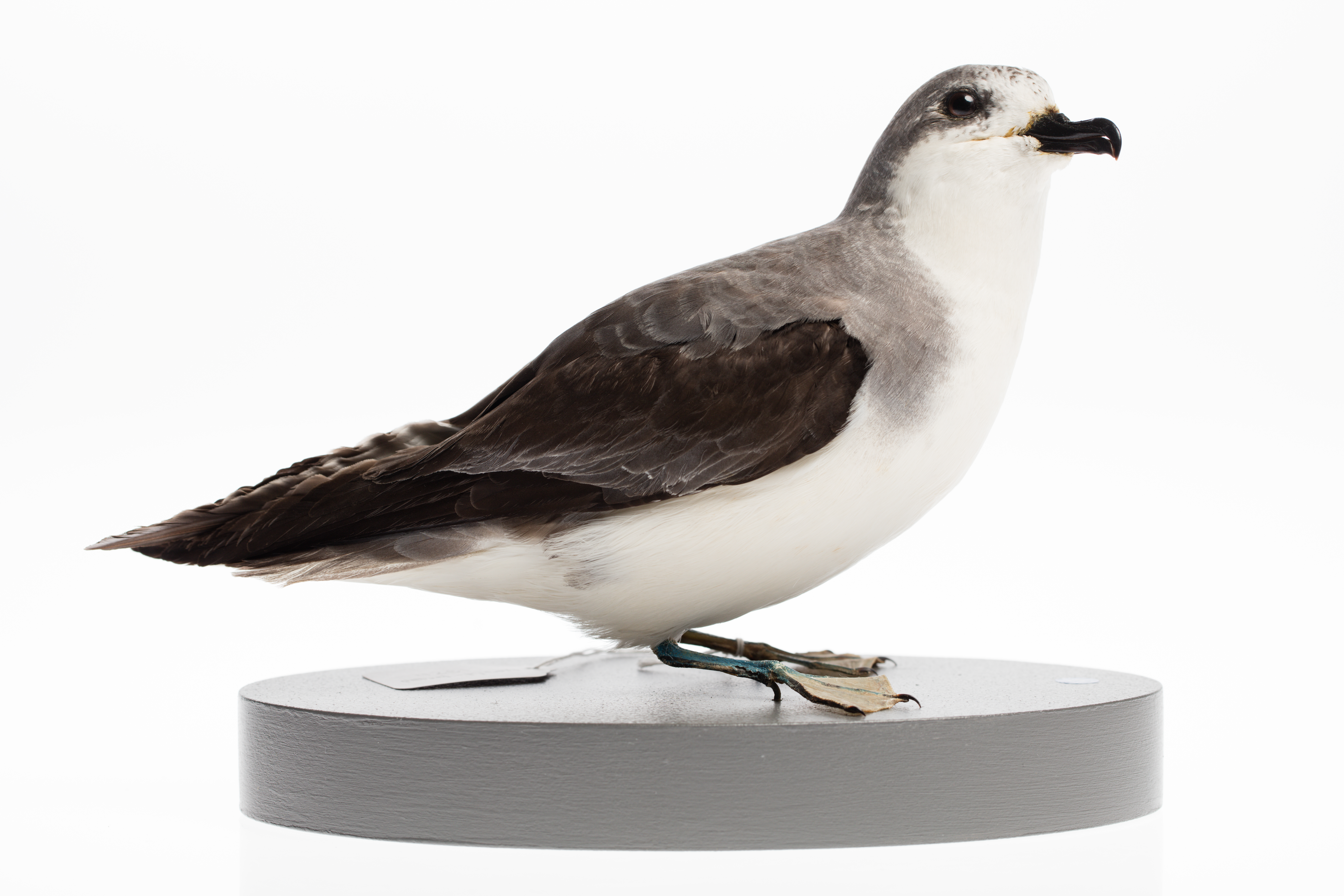
Pycroft's petrel as named by Robert Falla

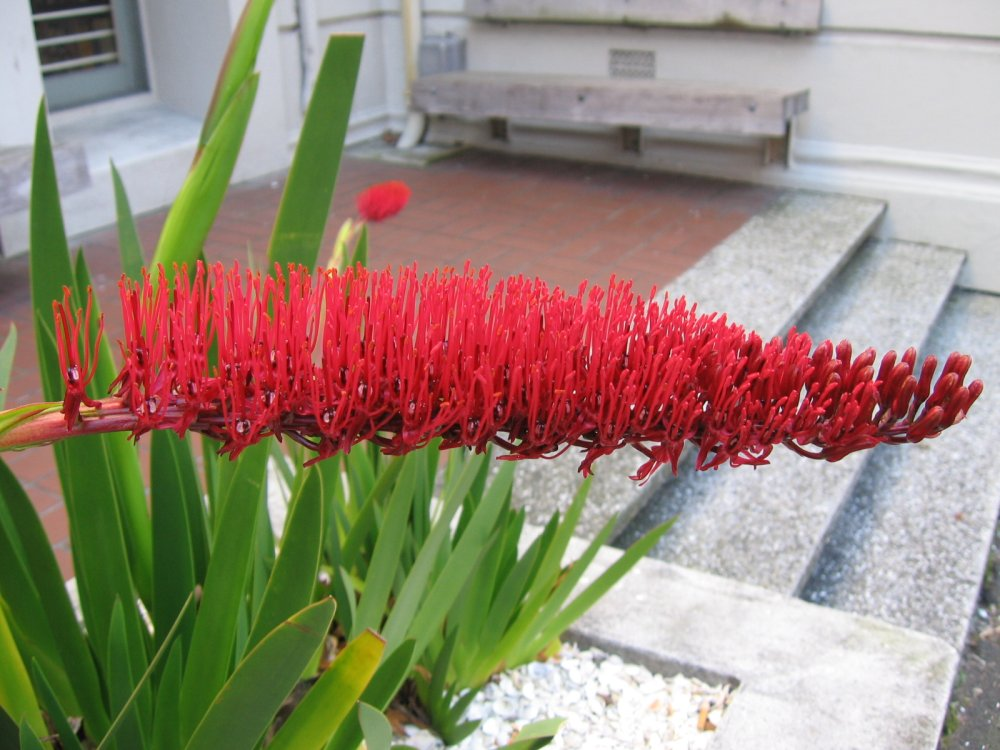
Example of a Poor Knights lily, a rare plant that Pycroft grew in his garden

Pycroft's real enthusiasm was for natural history, ornithology, and taxidermy.

All throughout his life, he collaborated with scientists, naturalists, and museum directors, and he was regarded as a respected colleague. One of his colleagues was Sir Walter Buller, with whom he corresponded about many bird species that Buller would later include in his 1905 Supplement to the History of the Birds of New Zealand, which amended his classic book A History of the Birds of New Zealand. Buller praised Pycroft for his "easy, scholarly, but modest style".

As was customary at the time, Pycroft collected birds by shooting them; even rare ones. He practised taxidermy and when a huia was delivered to him around 1905, he skinned the bird and had it cooked for his supper. Within two years of that incident, the last confirmed sighting of a huia was recorded. Auckland contemporary artist Hamish Foote exhibited a painting Pycroft's Supper in 2006 that illustrates the "tragic" story; huia were revered by both Māori and colonial settlers.

According to Robert Falla, who wrote Pycroft's obituary for the Ornithological Society of New Zealand, Pycroft had no interest in being a published author of scientific papers. He had an article published in the 1898 Transactions and Proceedings of the New Zealand Institute titled On Birds of the Bay of Islands. Pycroft seldom wrote scientific texts afterwards but had a weekly column in the Auckland Star titled Ways of the Wild through which he reported on his expeditions.

Pycroft went on many expeditions to the country's offshore islands. Some of these he organised for other ornithologists and naturalists to join him. He was particularly fond of Taranga Island (also known as Hen Island), the largest of the Hen and Chicken Islands east of Auckland. His first visit to Taranga Island was during the 1903–04 summer when he spent six weeks there. Robert Falla described a new species of petrel in 1933 (Pterodroma pycrofti) that is found on islands off the North Island and first seen on Taranga Island. In recognition of Pycroft's ornithological work, Falla named it Pycroft's petrel.

After he retired from work in 1925, Pycroft had more time for ornithology. He went to Little Barrier Island in 1928, the Kermadec Islands in 1929 alongside Herbert Guthrie-Smith, and Melanesia in 1932. Pycroft's wife Minna was acknowledged for her skill in preparing ornithological and botanical drawings.

Pycroft joined the Auckland Institute, the membership organisation of Auckland Museum, in 1896. He was on the council of the institute for over 40 years. He held membership of the Auckland Institute for 75 years. At the Institute's annual meeting on 15 May 1935, he was elected president for the coming year. During his presidency, he was granted leave in March 1936 "for the remainder of the year" to go to England. The Pycrofts left with their son on 3 April 1936 on the Monowai. The journey took longer than anticipated; the Pycrofts were away until October 1939. While in England, Pycroft indulged in another of his hobbies—collecting rare books—and visited many antique bookshops.

Later in his life, he came to prominence with research on moa, where he worked alongside Gilbert Archey, Frank Mappin, and Carrick Robertson.

The Pycrofts had their family home in Saint Heliers. With 4 hectares (9.9 acres), they had a large garden and Pycroft used it to grow rare plants sourced during island expeditions, including Xeronema callistemon (Poor Knights lily).

== Politics ==
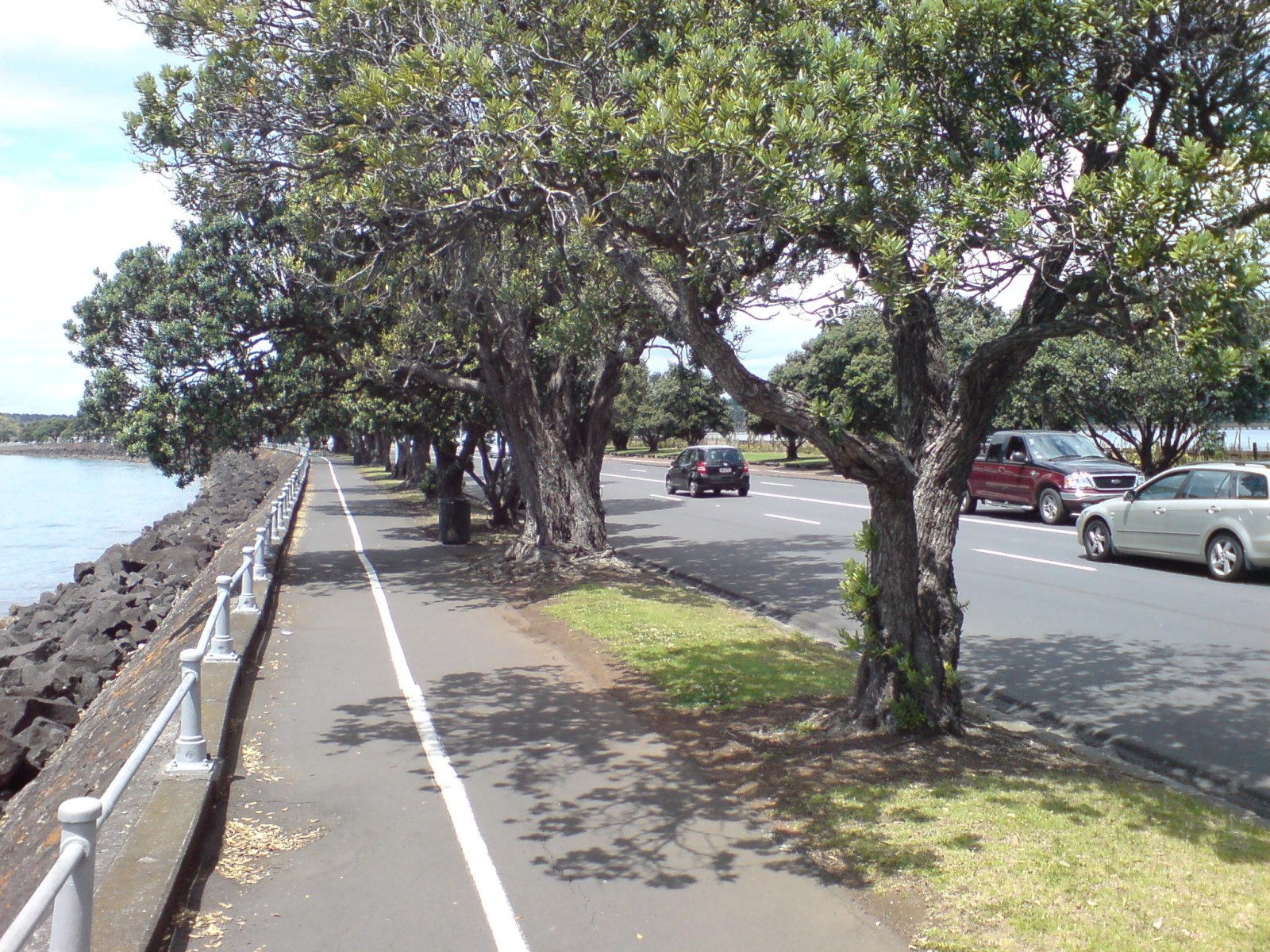
Tamaki Drive in 2007

In May 1922, Pycroft stood for the Tamaki West Road Board and was elected. He was re-elected in May 1924 and topped the poll. In April 1927, Pycroft announced that he would not stand in the upcoming election. During Pycroft's time on the road board, Tamaki Drive (then referred to as the waterfront road) was built.

== Death and legacy ==
Minna Pycroft died in August 1970, and Arthur Pycroft died on 8 November 1971 (Note: Note that two obituaries that are available online, AGMANZ News and Notornis, show an incorrect death date of 26 November 1971. Both these obituaries were written months after his death.) at his Saint Heliers residence. Both are buried at Purewa Cemetery in the Auckland suburb of Meadowbank. His library was put up for auction in 2011, 40 years after his death. It was described as the "last great private library" in New Zealand, with an auctioneer stating that a private library of similar status had last been put up for sale in 1983.

Pycroft Place in Saint Heliers is a cul-de-sac where the family had their home. Pycroft's petrel is the species of petrel named after him.
