= William Henry Havelock =

William Henry Havelock (8 December 1826 – 1 November 1876) was part of the Bombay Civil Service.

== Sind ==
He was the acting Commissioner in Sind from June 1867 to July 1868 during Major General William Merewether's absence.
