= John Duncan Inverarity =

Indian jurist

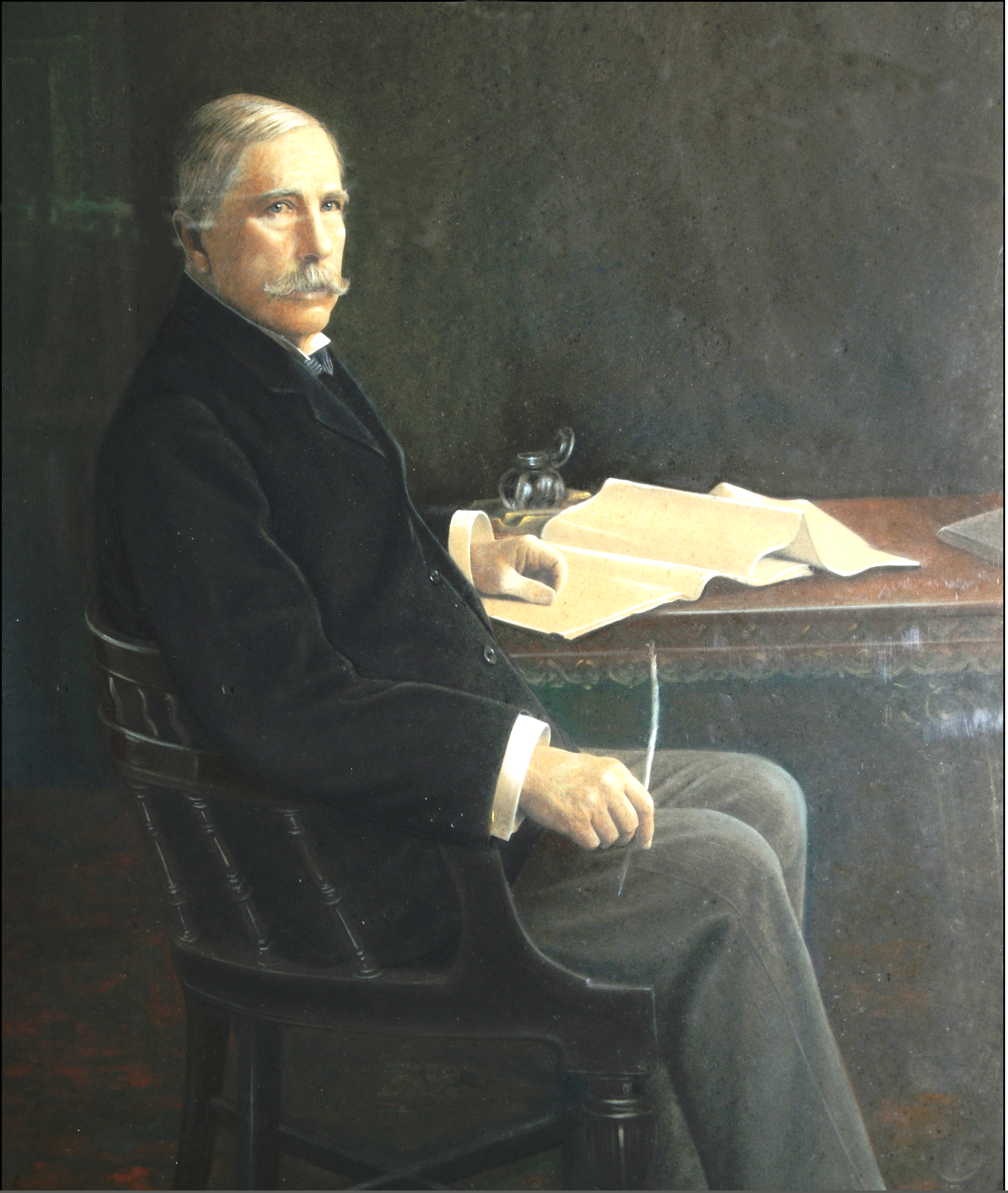
Commemorative portrait in the Bombay High Court

John Duncan Inverarity (7 January 1847, Bombay – 4 December 1923, Bombay) was a barrister-at-law and naturalist who worked in Bombay. He served in the Bombay Bar for 53 years.

== Life and work ==
John Duncan Inverarity was born in Bombay to Jonathan Duncan Inverarity (1812 - 1882) and Maria Martha Willoughby (d. 1871) in 1847. He went to study at Cheltenham College in England. He inherited some property of the Bombay governor Jonathan Duncan as well as a portrait of him made by Masquerier. He went to study law, and his contemporaries included Arthur Cohen and Spencer Perceval Butler. He joined as a Barrister in Bombay in 1869. He was called to bar at the Inner Temple in 1870. Apart from being a barrister in the Bombay High Court he was a keen outdoorsman and big game hunter and one of the early members of the Bombay Natural History Society, serving as its vice president from 1897 till his death. He once shot 26 snipe at Mahalakshmi race course where he also hunted bittern, duck and golden plover. He contributed short notes to A.O. Hume's Stray Feathers, the Journal of the Bombay Natural History Society on the tiger, water buffalo, and entries on tiger hunting in the Encyclopedia of Sport (1898). He was attacked by a lioness that he was hunting near Berbera in 1889, an incident that gathered considerable news coverage. He recounted the event in the Journal of the Bombay Natural History Society and wrote about how surprisingly painless the attack was. He married Margaret Eweretta, elder daughter of F.G. Forsyth-Grant of Kincardineshire in 1896. He was a regular bridge player at the Orient Club. He was noted for his memory both at games and at work.

His first major case was in the defence during the 1874 Towers of Silence case working with Pherozeshah Mehta and Thomas Anstey.

In James Joyce's book A Portrait of the Artist as a Young Man, the main character, Stephen Daedalus, owns a copy of Horace's verses owned by the brothers John and William Duncan Inverarity with notes in Latin pencilled on the margin.

The last ten years of his life he was nearly deaf. On the day of his death Inverarity attended court and felt unwell and was taken to St. George's Hospital where he died of angina pectoris at 9 pm. He is buried at the Sewree Christian Cemetery. The funeral cortege was followed by a large crowd with a very large number of Zoroastrians.
