= Lewin Bentham Bowring =

British colonial administrator (1824–1910)

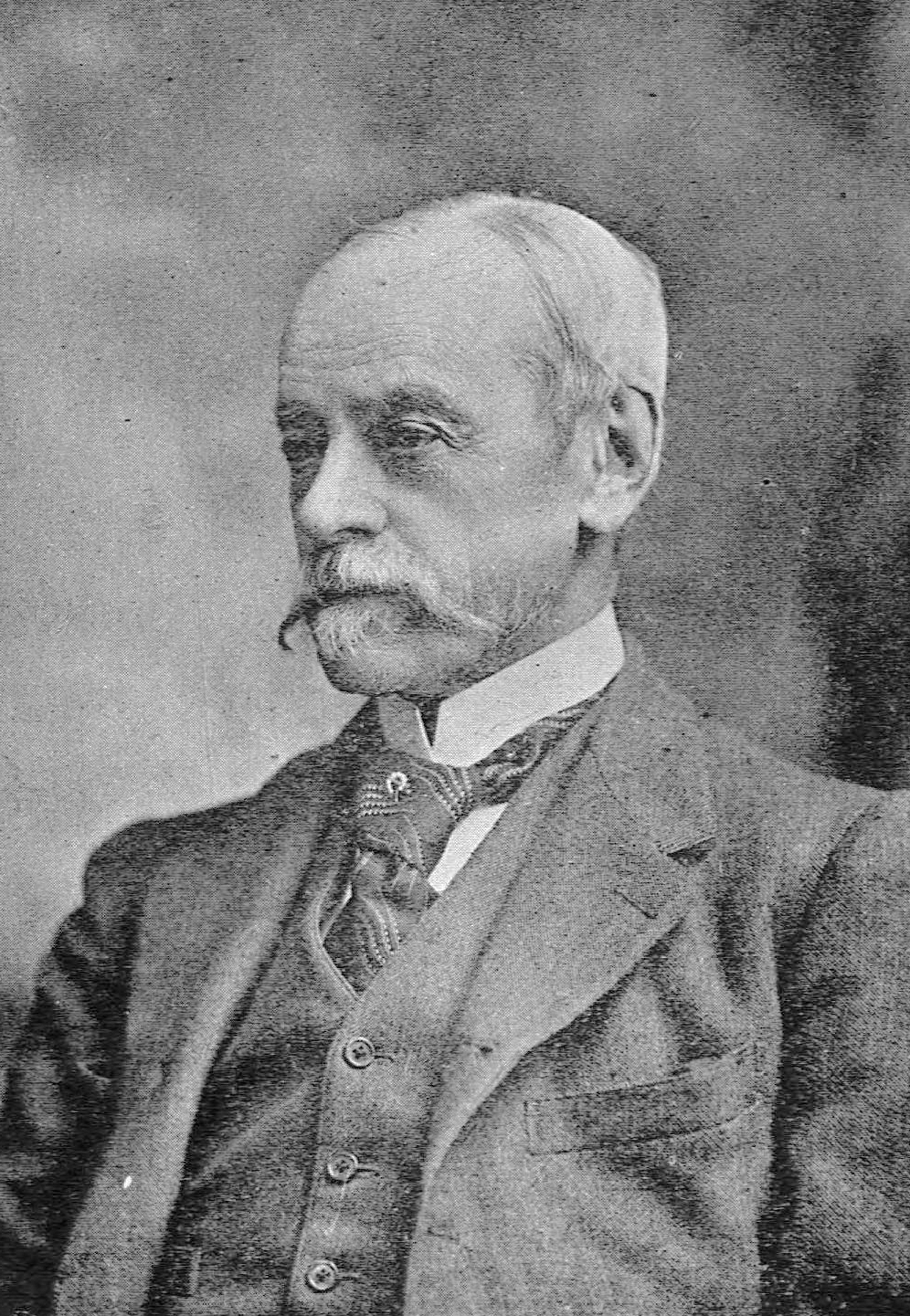
Bowring in 1910

Lewin Bentham Bowring (1824–1910) was a British Indian civil servant in British India who served as the Chief Commissioner of Mysore between 1862 and 1870. He was also an author and man of letters.

== Early life ==
Bowring was born in 1824. He was the second son of Sir John Bowring (1792-1872), of Exeter, Devon, Governor of Hong Kong, and was a brother of John Charles Bowring and Edgar Alfred Bowring. He was educated at Mount Radford School.

== Career ==
Bowring joined the Bengal Civil Service in 1843. He became Assistant Resident at Lahore in 1847, and later joined the Punjab commission. From 1858 to 1862, he was private secretary to the Viceroy of India, Lord Canning.

Bowring served as Chief Commissioner of Mysore from 1862 to 1870. This was during the period between 1831 and 1881 when the Maharaja of Mysore had been dispossessed of his state by the British Raj and Mysore was being administered by the Mysore Commission.

The Bowring Institute in Bangalore, which was founded by Lewis Rice in 1868, is named after him.

During the last year of his incumbency, Bowring also served as the first Chief Commissioner of Coorg. He was created Companion of the Order of the Star of India (CSI) in 1867. He retired from the Indian Civil Service in 1870 and returned to England the same year.

== Author ==
After retiring from service, Bowring turned his efforts to writing. He authored the book Haidar Ali and Tipu Sultan and the struggle with the Mussulman powers of the south, which was published in 1893 for the Rulers of India series. Bowring also edited his father's notes and published Autobiographical Recollections of Sir John Bowring in 1877.

== Notes ==
Government offices
Preceded by New office	Chief Commissioner of Coorg; 1869–1870	Succeeded by Richard Meade
