= Richard John Meade =

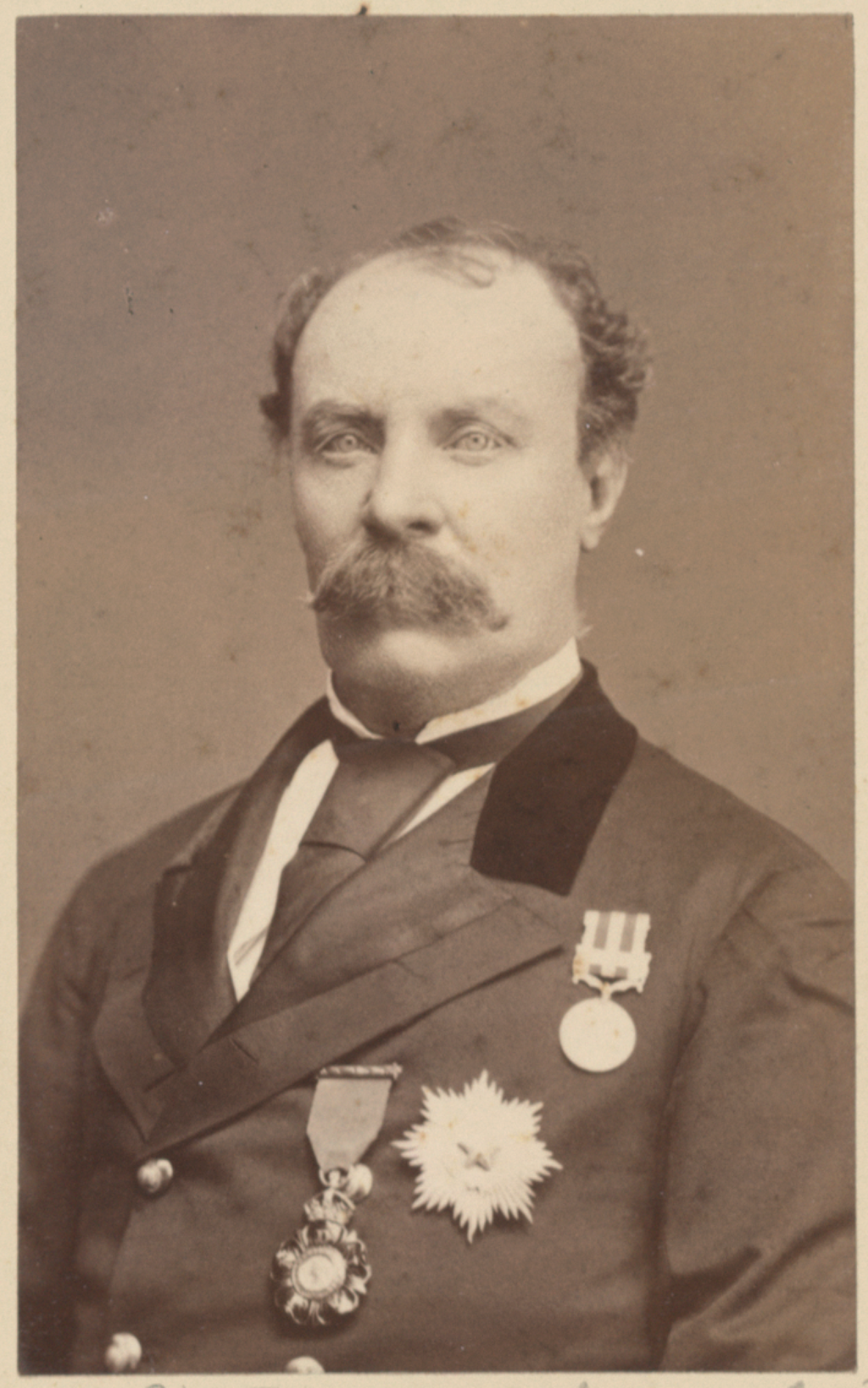
- Born: 25 September 1821
- Died: 20 March 1894 (aged 72)
- Military career
- Allegiance: United Kingdom
- Branch: British Indian Army
- Rank: General
- Conflicts: Indian Mutiny
- Awards: Knight Grand Commander of the Order of the Star of India; Companion of the Order of the Indian Empire

Signature
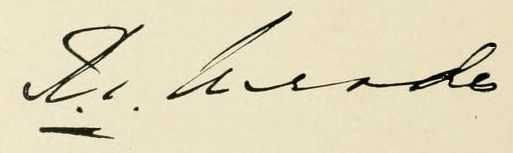

General Sir Richard John Meade GCSI CIE (25 September 1821 – 20 March 1894) was a British Indian Army officer who served as the Chief Commissioner of Mysore from 1870 to 1881.

== Military career ==
Meade was born at Innishannon County Cork to Captain John Meade of the Royal Navy and Elizabeth Quin. He studied at the Royal Naval School at New Cross in London, after which he received his commission as ensign and was posted to the 65th Regiment of the Bengal Native Infantry. He was part of the Central India Field Force during the troubles of 1857-59 and led the column which captured Tantya Tope and hanged him.

He was the British resident in the state of Hyderabad in 1875–81. He tutored and protected Maḥbūb ʻAlī Khān, the underage nizam (ruler). Thomas Henry Thornton, Meade's biographer and author of General Sir Richard Meade and the Feudatory States of Central and Southern India (1898), regarded this position as one of the most politically challenging in India. Meade's successes included "rebuffing" efforts by prime minister Mir Turab Ali Khan, known as Sir Sālār Jang (war leader) to reestablish Hyderabad's authority over the neighbouring province of Berar.

He also served in political employment at Gwalior, Indore, Mysore, Baroda and Hyderabad. After retirement, he functioned as Chairman of the Hyderabad State Railway Company. He died at Hyères in France, aged 73 where he was buried. His grave bears the inscription: "Born on 25th September 1821 he entered in eternal life on 20th March 1894 at Hyères in the South of France where his mortal remains have been laid".

== Sources ==
- Thornton, Thomas Henry (1898). General Sir Richard Meade and the feudatory states of central and southern India; a record of forty-three year's service as soldier, political officer and administrator. Longmans, Green & Co.

Government offices
Preceded by Lewin Bowring	Chief Commissioner of Coorg; 1870–1876	Succeeded by Charles Saunders
