= Jonathan Duncan Inverarity =

Scottish civil servant (1812–1882)

- Born: 11 August 1812; Bombay, Bombay Presidency, British India
- Died: 28 April 1882 (aged 69); Rosemount, Angus, Scotland
- Occupation: Civil servant
- Years active: 1931–1965

Jonathan Duncan Inverarity (11 August 1812 – 28 April 1882, Rosemount, Angus) was a Scottish civil servant of the Bombay Presidency.

Inverarity was born in Mumbai, to Helen née Gleig and Dr James Inverarity who named him after his friend Jonathan Duncan. Inverarity studied at the Edinburgh Academy from 1824 to 1826 before going to Addiscombe in 1826 and Haileybury from 1828 to 1830. Appointed to the Bombay Service in the East India Company, he studied at Hailebury College before he went to India in May 1831 and served initially in the Revenue Department. He later became a deputy collector of customs and then a deputy opium agent at Bombay. He transferred to become collector and magistrate of Abolapore Zilla. In 1854 he resigned and went on furlough for three years. During this period he explored the South Mahratta Country where he was for sometime a political agent and travelled around Mahabaleshwar and present day Uttara Kanara region. In 1859 he succeeded Sir Bartle Frere as Commissioners of Sind, holding the post till 1862, when he was appointed a Member of the Council in Bombay and sworn in on 24 March 1862. He retired with an annuity in 1865.

Inverarity's 1830 Haileybury notes of the teachings of Thomas Malthus and his interpretations of Adam Smith's Wealth of Nations have been an important source for the study of Malthus' teachings and ideas.

Inverarity married Maria Martha, eldest daughter of Sir John Pollard Willoughby, at Bombay in 1844. Martha died in 1871 and he later married Agnes Anne Spottiswoode, daughter of Captain Donald Oenas Mackay. They had five sons and a daughter. The eldest son John Duncan Inverarity (1847–1923) was an eminent barrister at the Bombay High Court.

Government offices
Preceded by Henry Bartle Frere	Commissioner in Sind; 1859–1862	Succeeded by Samuel Mansfield
