= Charles Bradley Pritchard =

British administrator in India

Sir Charles Bradley Pritchard, KCIE, CSI (5 May 1837 – 23 November 1903) was a British administrator in India.

The son of the headmaster and astronomer Charles Pritchard by his first wife Emily, née Newton, he was educated by his father, then at Rugby School and Sherborne School. He was nominated to the Indian Army and entered Addiscombe College, but then joined the East India Company as a writer and went to Haileybury College.

He was Commissioner of Sindh from 1887 to 1889. From 1892 to 1896, he was a member of the Council of the Governor-General of India, responsible for the public works department.
