= James Davidson Gordon =

British civil servant and administrator

Sir James Davidson Gordon KCSI (1835–1889) was a British civil servant and administrator who served as the Chief Commissioner to Mysore and Coorg from 1878 to 1881 and as the Chief Commissioner of Coorg up to 1883. He is credited with having introduced railways in the Kingdom of Mysore.

== Early life and career ==
Gordon was born in 1835 to Ewelyn Medows Gordon and educated at Haileybury. Gordon joined the Bengal Civil Service in 1854, where he was a magistrate and collector at Pabna District. served as Private Secretary to the Viceroy and Governor-General of India from 1866 to 1873. In 1873, he was appointed Judicial Commissioner of Mysore and Coorg and succeeded as Chief Commissioner in 1878.

== As Chief Commissioner ==
Gordon served as Chief Commissioner until 1883. Due to his previous experience as guardian to the Maharajah, Gordon was hopeful of restoring him to the throne.

Gordon introduced railways to the kingdom. The first railroad was constructed between Mysore and Bangalore in 1878.

Gordon's tenure as Chief Commissioner of Mysore ended in 1881 when the Kingdom of Mysore was restored. Gordon's status was altered to that of Resident or the British representative in the princely state. Gordon, however, continued to remain Chief Commissioner of Coorg till his retirement from the civil service in 1883.

== Death ==
Gordon returned to the United Kingdom upon retirement and died on 27 June 1889. At the time of his death, he was a member of the Travellers Club, and he lived in London.

== Honours ==
Gordon was made a Companion of the Order of the Star of India in 1866 and promoted to a Knight Commander of the Order of the Star of India in 1881.
