= William Merewether =

British general

Sir William Merewether
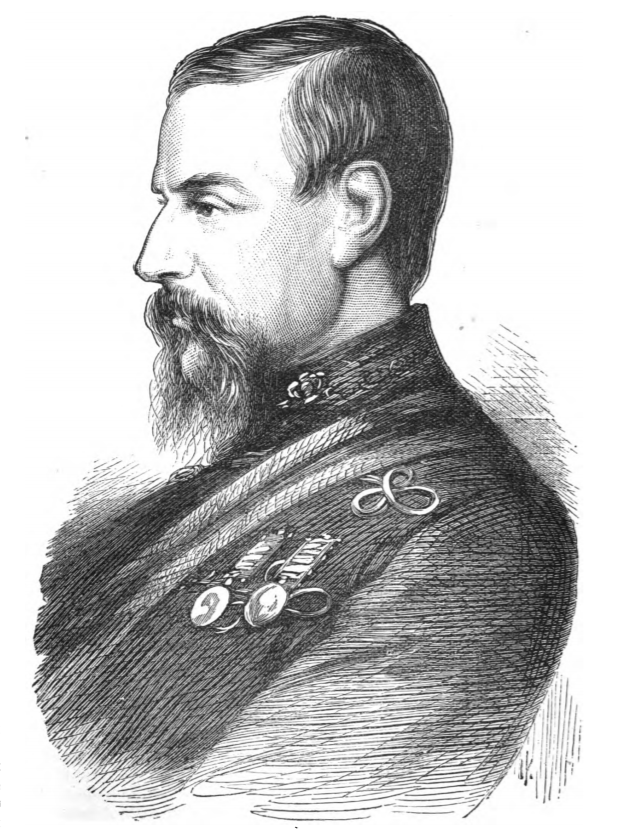
- Born: 6 February 1825; London, England
- Died: 4 October 1880 (aged 55); Bayswater, London, England
- Military career
- Allegiance: United Kingdom
- Branch: British Indian Army
- Rank: Major-General
- Conflicts: Abyssinia Expedition
- Awards: Knight Commander of the Order of the Star of India; Companion of the Order of the Bath

Major-General Sir William Lockyer Merewether KCSI CB (6 February 1825 – 4 October 1880) was a Bombay Army officer who served in a number of places including India and Abyssinia.

== Biography ==
Merewether was born in London to Sergeant Henry Alworth Merewether, educated at Westminster School before joining the Bombay Army in 1841. He served in the 21st Native Infantry regiment in Sind in 1843. He became second in command of the Sind horse from 1848 under Sir George Malcolm. He was made CB in 1860 and became a secretary to government at Bombay in 1861, served as a political agent and was British Resident at Aden from 1863 to 1867.

=== Abyssinia 1867–1868 ===
Merewether played a role as a member of the advance party for the Abyssinia Expedition of 1867–68. While a colonel, he landed at Mulkutto on the Gulf of Zula 21 October 1867, returning to the settlement at the end of the month, after having first explored along the base of the Ethiopian Highlands south until he encountered the Ragolay River, which empties into the Afar Depression, then identified Tekonda Pass as the best entrance to the Ethiopian Highlands. The next month, another party under his leadership pushed further inland to the Senafe Pass, which led from the dry bed of the Kumayli River to Senafe. After the expedition was successfully concluded, he was promoted to Brigadier General. He was knighted in 1868 for his work in negotiating with King Theodore of Abyssinia and for assisting Lord Napier at Bombay in 1867.

=== Sindh (Pakistan) ===
He was the Commissioner in Sind from 1867 to 1877. He was one of the founding members of Sind Club as well as its first president. From 1876 he served on the council of India.

== Personal life ==
Merewether was married to Harriet, daughter of J. Dale of Warwickshire from 1854. They had three sons.

== Memorials ==
Merewether Clock Tower is located in Karachi. There is also a ship pier named after him in Karachi Harbour.

Government offices
Preceded by Samuel Mansfield	Commissioner in Sind; 1867–77	Succeeded by Francis Dawes Melville
