= Coorg Province =

Province of British India

- Province of India
- 1834–1950
- Flag

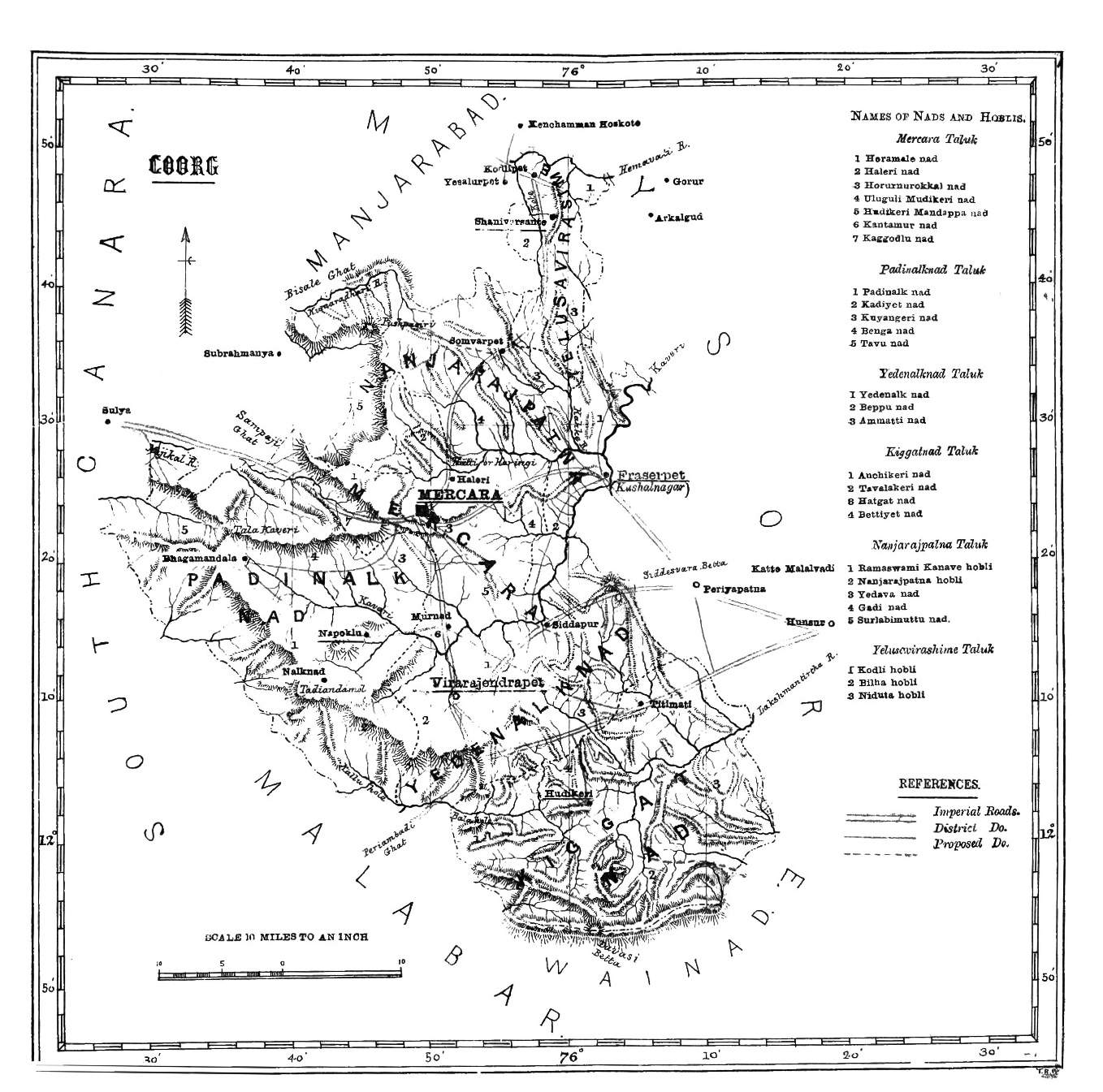
- Map of Coorg Province in 1876
- Capital: Mercara
- Area
- 1,582 km^{2} (611 sq mi)
- History
  - Coorg War: 10 April 1834
  - Independence of India: 15 August 1947
  - Reorganized as a state under the Constitution of India: 26 January 1950
Preceded by	Succeeded by
Kingdom of Coorg	Coorg State

Coorg Province was a province of British India from 1834 to 1947 and the Dominion of India from 1947 to 1950. Mercara was the capital of the province. It was administered by a Commissioner and later, Chief Commissioner appointed by the Government of India. The Chief Commissioner, was usually based in Bangalore. From 1834 to 1881, the Chief Commissioner, was also the Commissioner of Mysore. From 1881 to 1940, the Chief Commissioner was usually the British Resident to the princely state of Mysore.

The province of Coorg was established in May 1834, when the Kingdom of Coorg was abolished and its territories annexed to British India in the aftermath of the Coorg War. Coorg Province was largely inhabited by the Kodava people who spoke the Kodava language. During the 19th century, a number of coffee plantations were established in Coorg with the result that Coorg became one of the largest producers of coffee in the British Empire. The Kodava people of Coorg were renowned for their bravery and supplied a vast proportion of recruits to the British Indian army.

A Legislative council was established in 1924 comprising 15 elected and five nominated members. Coorg Province became a Part-C state of the Indian Union when the Republic of India was inaugurated on 26 January 1950. In 1956, the state was merged with the neighbouring Mysore State was per the States Reorganisation Act, 1956.

== History ==
Coorg Province was established in June 1834 following the capitulation of the last Maharajah of the Kingdom of Coorg, Chikka Virarajendra on 24 April 1834 culminating the Coorg War. General James Stuart Fraser, the Commander-in-chief of the East India Company forces in the war was appointed military administrator and served as the first Commissioner of Coorg Province. Fraser left in October 1834 when he was appointed Resident to the Kingdom of Mysore and Capt Le Hardy was appointed to succeed him. Le Hardy was succeeded by Sir Mark Cubbon who also took charge as Commissioner of Mysore in 1834 when the king Krishnaraja Wadiyar III was deposed. In 1837, a major insurrection broke out in the western part of the province instigated by the Tulu-speaking Gowda farmers which was finally quelled after a lengthy drawn-out operation. The Kodava chieftains who had largely remained impervious to nationalist sentiment and assisted the British with men, money and logistics, were rewarded with land grants, titles and the Coorg medal.

Cubbon ruled till 1859 reforming all branches of provincial administration and strictly imposing law and order. He also set up a model civil service made of native Indians. Cubbon was succeeded by L. B. Bowring who ruled till 1870. Bowring was succeeded by R. J. Meade, C. B. Saunders and J. D. Gordon. From 1834 to 1869, the administrator was styled "Commissioner of Mysore and Coorg" and from 1869 to 1881, Chief Commissioner of Mysore and Coorg. When the kingdom of Mysore was restored in 1881, the Commissioner of Coorg ceased to be the administrator of Mysore and post was replaced with that of a Resident who continued to direct affairs from Bangalore.

On 1 July 1940, Coorg was made practically independent of Mysore and a separate Chief Commissioner, J. W. Pritchard was appointed to administer the province. Pritchard was succeeded by Ketoli Chengappa, the first Indian to hold the post. Coorg became independent of British rule on 15 August 1947 when Chengappa was the Chief Commissioner. It remained a province until 26 January 1950, when the Constitution of India replaced provinces with states.

== Administration ==
When the East India Company took over the state at the end of the Coorg War, the taluks of Amara-Sulya and Puttur were separated from Coorg and attached to Kanara. In October 1834, direct rule of the Company was established with the formation of the province of Coorg. From then on, Coorg was ruled by a Commissioner and from 1869, a Chief Commissioner based in Bangalore. From 1881, the Chief Commissioner was usually the Resident to the princely state of Mysore. He directed his affairs through a Superintendent stationed at Fraserpet during the monsoon season and at Mercara throughout the rest of the year. The Superintendent was usually a European officer of the Mysore Civil Service. On 1 July 1940, the Chief Commission was separated from the Mysore Residency and a separate Chief Commissioner was appointed with his seat in Mercara.

The province of Coorg was divided into six taluks - Kiggatnad, Mercara, Nanjarajapatna, Padinalkad, Yedenalkad and Yelusaviraseeme. The taluks were further sub-divided into nads or hoblis. In 1878, Coorg had a total of 508 villages and six towns - Mercara, Virajpet, Fraserpet, Somwarpet, Kodlipet and Ponnampet.

Taluk	Taluk Headquarters	Area (in square miles)	Number of villages				
Taluk	Taluk Headquarters	Area (in square miles)	Number of villages	Kiggatnad	Hudikere	400	63
Mercara	Mercara	209	57				
Nanjarajapatna	Fraserpet	262	114				
Padinalknad	Napoklu	413	57				
Yedenalknad	Virajpet	210	49				
Yelusaviraseeme	Shanivarsante	91	168				

The revenue system of Coorg was based on the "Rules for the conduct of district functionaries in Coorg", a document issued by Colonel Fraser on 30 August 1834.

Till 1924, Coorg did not have a legislature of its own. By a notification dated 22 February 1875, Coorg was included in the Scheduled Districts Act IV of 1874 which empowered the provincial government to exempt Coorg Province from certain pan-Indian legislations. In 1920, the Coorg Landholders' Association was formed to campaign for more rights for landholders. On 28 January 1924, a 20-member legislative assembly was established comprising 15 elected and 5 nominated members. This assembly survived with minor changes even after the independence. In 1949, the number of members was reduced by two when the European constituency was abolished.

A judicial system on part with the rest of British India was constituted as per the Coorg Courts' Act XXV of 1868. As per this act, from 1 December 1868 onwards, a Subedar's court, a Daryaft Kacheri, an Assistant Superintendents' Court, a Superintendents' Court, a Sessions' Court and a Judicial Commissioners' Court were created. There was one Subedars' Court for every taluk each of which was presided over by the Subedar of the taluk. The Daryaft Kacheri was presided over by a Moktasir who was a native judge assisted by four Panchayatdars. The Assistant Superintendents' Court was presided over by an Englishman and an Indian each holding the powers of a magistrate and sub-magistrate respectively. The Superintendents' Court was presided over by the Superintendent of Coorg who exercised original jurisdiction. The Sessions' Court was presided over the Superintendent of the adjacent Ashtagrama Division of Mysore of which Coorg was a part of, from November 1862 to July 1863. The Judicial Commissioner of Coorg was the highest appellate authority in the province. This office was created in 1856.

== Demographics ==
Historical population
Year	Pop.	±%
1871	168,312	—
1881	178,302	+5.9%
1891	173,055	−2.9%
1901	180,607	+4.4%
1911	174,976	−3.1%
1921	163,838	−6.4%
1931	163,327	−0.3%
1941	168,726	+3.3%

Religion in Coorg province (1871 census)
religion	percent
Hindus	91.6%
Muslims	6.7%
Christian	1.4%
Jain	0.3%

According to the 1871 census, Coorg had a population of 168,312 with Hindus making up 154,474 or 91.6 percent of the total population and Muslims (11,304; 6.7 percent), Christians (2,410; 1.4 percent) and Jains (112 individuals) making up the rest. There were also 10 Parsis and 2 Chinese. Among the adherents of Hinduism, the Kodavas numbered 26,389 individuals (17 percent), the rest being non-Kodavas. Tribal Hindus numbered 14,783 (9 percent) and nomadic tribes and gypsies numbered 1,344 (0.8 percent). The Amma Kodavas are believed to have comprised the priestly class of the Kodavas prior to the arrival of Brahmins. Muslims were largely concentrated in Mercara, Padinelkad and Yedinalkad taluks and belonged to the Labbai, Mappilai, Pathan and Pindari communities. Muslims in Coorg were predominantly Sunni. Of the 2,410 Christians, 181 were European and 229 were Anglo-Indian.

The official language in Coorg province was Kannada but the mother tongue of the native Kodava people was the Kodava takk. Kodava takk was often considered to be nothing more than a dialect of Kannada and the linguist Robert Caldwell concluded that Kodava "stood midway between Old Canarese (Hale Kannada) and Tulu". Other important languages spoken in Coorg included Tulu, Malayalam, English and various tribal languages.

== Economy ==
The total estimated revenue of the province in 1949-50 was Rs. 62.98 lakhs and the estimated expenditure stood at Rs. 87.69 lakhs. The main products of Coorg include coffee, tea and rubber. Coorg was one of India's largest producers of tea with a total of 415 acres under tea cultivation. During the rule of the Coorg Rajahs, rice was the most important crop cultivated. It was replaced by coffee when the state passed into British rule. The first coffee plantation was established near Mercara in 1854. From 1854 to 1870, coffee cultivation in Coorg expanded rapidly as exports increased from 579 tons in 1857 to 3,000 tons in 1867 and 4,880 tons in 1876. Coffee production slowed down due to a blight in 1870 in 1871 but recovered quickly reaching the peak of production between 1878 and 1883. Coffee prices fell by 40 percent between 1879 and 1889 due to the competition of imported Brazilian coffee on the local market but recovered in 1890 when there was a shortage of supply from Brazil. With fluctuating fortunes, coffee continues to be Coorg's most important source of revenue.

Rice is Coorg's principal food crop. In 1948-49, Coorg exported about 11,800 tons of rice to Mysore state and the Malabar district of Madras Presidency. About 240 tons of wheat were, in return, imported every year from Mysore as per an allotment made by the Central government. Other major food crops grown in Coorg were orange, cardamom and pepper. As of 1950, there were 41,182 acres under coffee cultivation, 88,105 acres under paddy, 17,924 acres under orange, 4,370 acres under cardamom, 3,180 acres under rubber and 258 acres under pepper.

== Transport and communication ==
There have been roads in existence in Coorg for many centuries but these roads were not suitable enough for bullock carts and carriages. The first tractable roads in Coorg were built by the British. The two main roads in Coorg constructed in the 19th century were the Eastern Trunk Road and the Northern Trunk Road both meeting at Mercara. The road from Mysore enters Coorg at Fraserpet and runs for nineteen and a half miles to Mercara. Construction was commenced in January 1835 by the Sappers and Mines company and completed in 1837. The road traverses the Cauvery by a 516 feet long masonry bridge with 7 arches completed between 1846 and 1848. The Sampaji Ghat road which connects Mercara with Mangalore was commenced after the monsoons in 1837 and was completed after enduring much practical difficulties and fever. The road from Cannanore to Mercara was completed in 1849 and extended to Kodlipet in 1862. The road was opened for traffic in 1868. The Northern Trunk Road connects Mercara with Manjarabad through Somwarpet and Kodlipet and was completed in 1869. A Public Works Department for Coorg Province was inaugurated in 1862. The department was headed by an Executive Engineer.

There were no railways in Coorg though various suggestions have been mooted from time to time. In 1902, Coorg planters petitioned the Viceroy Lord Curzon for the construction of a railway connecting Coorg with Tellicherry on west coast. A survey was carried out to build a line from Mysore to Tellicherry but the proposal was subsequently shelved.

== Education ==
In 1834, the first schools teaching English and Kanarese were opened at Mercara and Virajpet. This was followed by a Canarese medium school at Kiggatnad. A total of Rs. 90 was allotted towards establishment of an education department. However, the Kiggatnad school closed down in 1842 due to lack of funds. In 1855, Dr. Moegling, the first Protestant missionary in Coorg established an English school at Mercara. By 1870, there were a total of 25 vernacular schools, most of them affiliated to the Central School at Mercara. There were Anglo-Vernacular schools in all taluk headquarters.
