= Bowring =

Bowring is a surname of English origin. At the time of the British Census of 1881, its relative frequency was highest in Dorset (36.5 times the British average), followed by Nottinghamshire, Derbyshire, Gloucestershire, Northamptonshire, Hampshire, Surrey, the Channel Islands, Shropshire and Somerset.

The name Bowring may refer to:

- Arthur Bowring (1873–1944), American rancher and politician, husband of Eva Bowring
- Benjamin Bowring (1778–1846), English-Newfoundland businessman
- Charles Calvert Bowring (1872–1945), British colonial administrator (East Africa), son of J. C. Bowring
- Charles R. Bowring (1840–1890), Newfoundland politician and merchant, grandson of Benjamin Bowring and brother of Sir William Bowring.
- Edgar Alfred Bowring (1826–1911), British translator and author, son of John Bowring
- Edgar Rennie Bowring (1858–1943), businessman and first high commissioner of Newfoundland, grandson of Benjamin Bowring and first cousin of Charles R. Bowring and William Bowring (1837–1918).
- Eva Bowring (1892–1985), American politician, wife of Arthur Bowring.
- Humphrey Bowring (1874–1952) – British admiral, son of J. C. Bowring
- John Bowring (1792–1872), an English political economist and writer. Governor of Hong Kong from 1854 to 1859. First cousin once removed of Benjamin Bowring
- J. C. Bowring (1820–1893), the eldest son of John Bowring.
- Kevin Bowring, former rugby union player and coach.
- Lewin Bentham Bowring (1824–1910), son of John Bowring
- Richard Bowring (b. 1947), Professor of Japanese Studies at the University of Cambridge
- Walter Andrew Bowring (1875 - 1950), British colonial administrator
- Walter Armiger Bowring (1874 – 1931), New Zealand painter and cartoonist
- Sir William Bowring (1837–1918), Liverpool, England politician and merchant, grandson of Benjamin Bowring and brother of Charles R. Bowring.
- William Bowring (cricketer) (1874–1945), son of Charles R. Bowring

The name is an occupational name deriving from the pre-7th Century Old English bur meaning "a bower, a chamber", and ing, in this context, "a friend" or "servant", one who looked after the "bower-chamber" in a lord or chief's house.

Job-descriptive surnames originally denoted the actual occupation of the namebearer, and later became hereditary. There are many developed spellings, all with essentially the same meaning, although some are common as surnames and these include: Bower, Bur, Bowerman, Borman, Bowra, Boorer, Burra, Bowring and Bowering. The surname was first recorded in the early 14th Century (see below), and other early recordings include: Mayfflin atte Bur (1280, Somerset); Gilbert atte Boure (1296, Sussex); Robert Boreman (1327, Sussex; and Walter Bowryng (1328, Somerset). The first recorded spelling of the family name is shown to be that of Henry Bouryng, which was dated 1302, in the "Pipe Rolls of Derbyshire", during the reign of King Edward I, known as "The Hammer of the Scots", 1272 – 1307.

== See also ==
- Benjamin Bowring, a ship used in the Transglobe Expedition
- Bowring Brothers Ltd. – also known as Bowring, a chain of stores in Canada
- Bowring Ranch State Historical Park – Nebraska
- Bowring Park – St. John's, Newfoundland
- Bowring Park (disambiguation)
- Bowring, Oklahoma, a community and CDP
