= Daniel Richard Caldwell =

British colonial administrator (1816–1875)

Daniel Richard Francis Caldwell
- Born: 19 September 1816; St Helena
- Died: 2 October 1875 (aged 59); Hong Kong
- Occupation: Colonial official

Daniel Richard Francis Caldwell (19 September 1816 – 2 October 1875) was a colonial government official in Hong Kong. He was Registrar General and Protector of Chinese from 1856 to 1862 and was involved in the notorious Caldwell Affair in the late 1850s.

== Early life ==
He was born in British East India Company's island of Saint Helena to Daniel Caldwell and Mary Caldwell on 13 September 1816. When he was a child, he followed his father, a soldier in a local militia corps first to Penang and then to Singapore. In 1834, he commanded his own trading ships before becoming a clerk in Canton, where he was employed in a lucrative opium trading company. "He has a reputation as a womaniser and was said to have learned Chinese through his liaisons with various women," according to historian Christopher Munn. Due to his sound linguistic skills, in which he was fluent in several Chinese dialects as well as Malay, Hindustani and Portuguese, Caldwell served as an interpreter to the British during the First Opium War.

== Career in Hong Kong ==
In 1842 he settled in Hong Kong and became essential to the colonial administration in dealing with the local Chinese in the earliest years of Hong Kong as a British colony. He first worked as court interpreter, and then appointed assistant superintendent of the Hong Kong Police in 1846. He resigned from the government for the first time when he declared bankruptcy in 1847 and escaped creditors by fleeing to the neighbouring Portuguese colony of Macao. He was again employed by the government soon afterwards. Caldwell was effective in clamping down on crime and piracy by using his network of informers, being head of detectives and guide to the Royal Navy in its expeditions against pirates. He was involved in the Battle of Huhlan Bay which took place on 4 August 1855, in which HMS Rattler and USS Powhattan destroyed ten pirate junks and killed more than 800 pirates.

Soon after the battle, Caldwell resigned from the government due to low pay and purchased a merchant steamer, The Eaglet, which ran coastal trade and set up convoys escorting junks along the South China coast. When the Second Opium War broke out, calling Caldwell "the only government functionary through whom we have ever had satisfactory intercourse with the native population", Governor John Bowring employed Caldwell as Registrar General and Protector of Chinese (later Secretary for Chinese Affairs), which dealt with the issues related to the local Chinese community in 1856. He was given extensive powers over the lives and businesses of local Chinese under the emergency legislation in 1857 and 1858. His duties was also extended to the registration and licensing of brothels under the new Venereal Diseases Ordinance. His power and influence boosted by his extensive connections in the Chinese society and his guidance to the Royal Navy on the anti-pirate expeditions and his guidance to the government to track down wanted criminals and communicate with the Chinese community. he uncovered an assassination plot of himself and Lieutenant Governor William Caine in April 1857.

== Caldwell Affair ==
In early 1857, some Chinese agents attempted to poison the European community through its morning bread supply, which caused the fear and suspicion between the local Chinese and European residents. In the same year, Caldwell was involved in a scandal as an American pirate Eli Boggs accused Caldwell of having criminal connections with the notorious gangster Wong Ma-chow and claimed he had been framed by Wong Ma-chow, who was a key informer and associate of Caldwell. Wong was arrested on 16 July 1857, followed by the defence from Caldwell who demanded an acquittal. On 10 May 1858, the Colonial Treasurer Frederick Forth made an allegation of Caldwell owning a brothel. Attorney General Thomas Chisholm Anstey weighed in, by calling Caldwell a "brothel keeper and pirate" and referring to his wife, a Chinese woman named Mary Ayow, as "that harlot". Even Caldwell's own racial identity was questioned, who had only a few years earlier been described as having "blue eyes and truly English countenance", was now described as a "man of mixed blood" and a "Singapore half-caste". The scandal was described by Governor Bowring as "seldom been paralleled by any assemblage of Englishmen met in official conclave."

The Acting Colonial Secretary W. T. Bridges, who was a Freemason like Caldwell, destroyed Wong Ma-chow's account books, the crucial evidence which allegedly contained entries firmly implicating Caldwell in Wong's piratical activities, in the name of saving office space. To play down the allegations, Bowring set up a Commission of Inquiry which consisted of friends of Caldwell's. Its chairman, the Surveyor General Charles Cleverly, was also a Freemason. One of the four members was Legislative Councillor George Lyall was a close friend of Caldwell's. The commission's counsel, John Day, had defended Wong Ma-chow. Anstey was later suspended and sent back to Britain, and the government sued the journalist William Tarrant, who had revealed Bridges' protection of Caldwell, for libel. Anstey went on to wrote a 30,000-word letter to The Times detailing the corruption of the "reign of terror" in the Hong Kong government, which brought the scandals to the British press and parliament.

Caldwell went on to take the vital role in the clamping down pirates by directing Royal Navy warships in anti-piracy operations. After Bowring was replaced as governor by Hercules Robinson in 1859, another Commission of Inquiry was set up over the Caldwell Affair, chaired by the new governor himself. Caldwell claimed that the allegations against him were a conspiracy based on the grudges of Charles May, Anstey, and some newspaper editors jealous of his success and resentful of his protective attitude towards the Chinese. He went on accusing May of running an illegal brothel, managed by a mistress of his, to which Anstey was a frequent visitor. Caldwell wrote that "of all places in the world perhaps there is not one where scandal and detraction are more rife, so readily invented, so industriously circulated and, I regret to add, so eagerly sought after, as at Hong Kong." The inquiry found decisively against Caldwell on the charge of perverting the course of justice and found grounds for suspicion on other charges, including having used the Royal Navy to carry out the "nefarious designs" and strengthen the influence of a "notorious pirate". It declared Caldwell unfit for public service.

== Later life, family and death ==
After being dismissed by the government, he made a good living as a Chinese agent, an intermediary and advocate for Chinese businesses. Subsequently, Governor Richard Graves MacDonnell employed him as advisor to the licensed gaming-house keepers and an unofficial head of the secret police which were considered more effective at detecting crime and catching criminals than the Police Force itself.

Caldwell was a Freemason. He married Mary Chan Ayow in about 1845 through a traditional Chinese marriage ceremony. She was converted and became a member of the London Missionary Society congregation. A Christian marriage service was performed at the St. John's Cathedral in March 1851. The couple had 12 children and over 20 adopted children of Chinese descent. He died in Hong Kong on 2 October 1875 and buried at the Hong Kong Cemetery in Happy Valley, Hong Kong where a huge and ornate tombstone was erected by his fellow Freemasons.

After Caldwell's death, Chan Ayow inherited his properties. She sold the property located at the intersection of Hollywood Road and Aberdeen Street to the London Missionary Society at HK$35,000 which was half of its worth at the time. On this site was later built Alice Memorial Hospital and the Hong Kong College of Medicine and To Tsai Church where Dr. Sun Yat-sen studied and worshiped in his early days.

Government offices
Preceded by Charles May	Registrar General and Protector of Chinese; 1856–1862	Succeeded by Thomas Turner
