= Hong Kong Government Gazette =

Official journal of the Hong Kong government

- Traditional Chinese: 香港特別行政區政府憲報
- Simplified Chinese: 香港特别行政区政府宪报
Transcriptions
Standard Mandarin
- Hanyu Pinyin: Xiānggǎng Tèbié Xíngzhèngqū Zhèngfǔ Xiànbào
Yue: Cantonese
- Yale Romanization: Hēung góng dahk biht hàhng jing kēui jing fú hin bou
- Jyutping: Hoeng^{1} Gong^{2} dak^{6} bit^{6} hang^{4} zing^{3} keoi^{1} zing^{3} fu^{2} hin^{3} bou^{3}

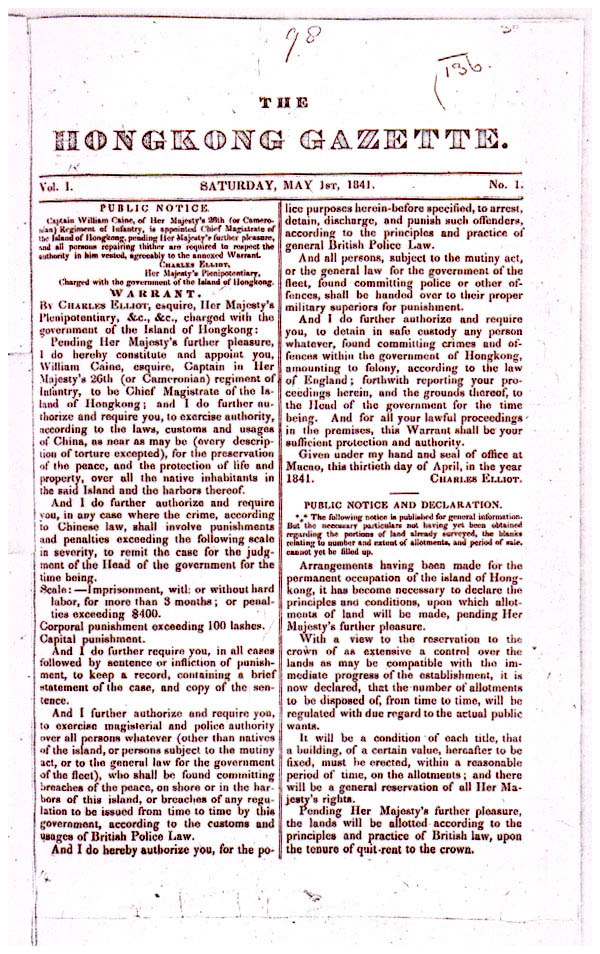
The Hongkong Gazette Vol. I No. 1 1 May 1841.

The Government of Hong Kong Special Administrative Region Gazette (formerly and still widely known as The Hong Kong Government Gazette) is the official publication of the Government of Hong Kong. Published by the Government Logistics Department (GLD), it acts as an official channel to promulgate information which is required for statutory or other reasons to be made public, including legislation, ordinances, appointments of major officials and public notices.

It is normally published on Fridays.

== Contents ==
The Gazette consists of seven parts:

- Main Gazette – contains government notices on appointments (of senior government officials, members of statutory bodies, etc), departmental notices and public tenders;
- Legal Supplement No. 1 – newly enacted or amended ordinances passed by the Legislative Council;
- Legal Supplement No. 2 – newly enacted or amended regulations passed by the Legislative Council;
- Legal Supplement No. 3 - bills;
- Special Supplement No. 4 - lists of certain categories of professionals and establishments (such as doctors, real estate agents and nursery centres) whose names are required by law to be published in the Gazette periodically;
- Special Supplement No. 5 - Draft Bills, Executive Orders, Orders of the State Council, etc; and
- Supplement No. 6 - public notices on matters such as liquidation, bankruptcy and transfer of business, that can be placed by members of the public at a fee.

Regular issues of the Gazette are usually published every Friday, except when a public holiday falls on Friday. Gazette Extraordinaries might also be published in between regular issues to carry important notices. Gazette Extraordinaries were previously published on need basis, but during the COVID-19 pandemic, these have been increased to a daily basis so that statutory notices of compulsory COVID-19 testing for specific groups of people could be promulgated.

== History ==
The Hongkong Gazette was founded on 1 May 1841 by John Robert Morrison as the earliest newspaper in Hong Kong. It was printed in Macao and published every two weeks. It merged with The Friend of China, an English weekly newspaper, on 24 March 1842 to become Friend of China and Hongkong Gazette. The merged newspaper was first a mouthpiece of the Superintendency of Trade, but after its editor, William Tarrant was jailed for libel in 1859, the newspaper stopped publishing.

The current form of the Hong Kong government gazette began on 24 September 1853 when the Hongkong Government Gazette (香港政府憲報) started publication, following a proclamation by William Caine, the Colonial Secretary, that it would become "the only Official Organ of Proclamations, Notifications, and all Public Papers of this Government".

When Hong Kong became the Special Administrative Region of the People's Republic of China on 1 July 1997, the Hong Kong Government Gazette (香港政府憲報) was renamed the Government of the Hong Kong Special Administrative Region Gazette. The format remained largely unchanged but the serial numbering of volumes started anew from Volume 1.

Old records are kept by libraries around the world (including the Hong Kong Central Library), and in the Central Preservation Library for Government Preservation of the Public Records Office. Additionally, the public may also access the scanned copies of gazette issued before World War II on the HKU Libraries website. The official website of the Gazette contains online records of the Gazette (in PDF format) dating back to 2000.
