= William Tarrant =

Hong Kong civil servant and journalist

William Tarrant (died 26 January 1872; Chinese: 泰倫; Cantonese Yale: Taailèuhn) was a civil servant and newspaper editor in British Hong Kong. He served as Inspector of Land and Roads and subsequently Registrar of Deeds in the Hong Kong colonial administration from 1842 to 1847, but was removed from office and barred from public service owing to allegations he had raised against Colonial Secretary William Caine, which an internal government inquiry held to be fabricated. Tarrant then began a new career in journalism, purchasing the Friend of China newspaper in 1850. He became prominently involved in a scandal involving multiple senior government officers, the Caldwell affair, in 1857, and was ultimately found guilty of libel and imprisoned in 1859. He left the colony after his release in 1860, and made two attempts over the course of the 1860s to restart the Friend of China in Guangzhou and Shanghai, each proving abortive. Finally, he sold the paper in 1869 and retired to England, where he died in 1872.

== Early life and civil service career ==
A man of "humble" origin, Tarrant first arrived in China as a ship steward in 1837, before the cession of Hong Kong in 1841, and spent the next four years as a sailor in East Asia. Upon the transfer of Hong Kong to British control, Tarrant was employed by the new colonial administration as Inspector of Land and Roads in 1842. He is particularly associated in this capacity with the construction of Wong Nai Chung Gap Road. Tarrant's health suffered from working outside in the Hong Kong climate, however, and the Surveyor General, his superior, reshuffled him to the post of Registrar of Deeds, charged with the preparation of land leases.

Tarrant lost his position in the colonial administration in 1847 as a result of an allegation he made that a comprador of William Caine, the Colonial Secretary, was abusing his position to extort money from stall-holders in the Central Market. An inquiry by the Chief Magistrate and the Acting Attorney and Solicitor General found Tarrant's charge baseless—Tarrant himself claimed that he had delayed reporting the crime by eight or nine months—and accused Tarrant of conspiring to injure Caine's reputation. He was suspended from his position as Registrar of Deeds. Criminal charges were never brought against Tarrant, however, and the Acting Attorney General's report was not released. Tarrant asked the government for his reinstatement and payment of his salary in arrears, but the office of Registrar of Deeds was abolished in September 1847 and Governor John Francis Davis refused to re-employ him.

With the arrival of a new governor, George Bonham, in 1848, Tarrant hoped he could re-enter public service and accordingly petitioned Bonham for a government post. Despite support for Tarrant from Earl Grey, the incumbent Secretary of State for the Colonies in London who considered him to be a victim of political persecution, the governor declined his request on the pretext that no position was available, and wrote privately that "from what he had heard", he judged Tarrant personally unsuitable for such a career.

== Journalism ==
Excluded from the colonial administration, Tarrant decided to embark on a new career as a journalist, and in 1850 purchased The Friend of China, an influential Hong Kong newspaper, becoming its editor and publisher. He quickly garnered a reputation as an aggressive and—in George Beer Endacott's words—"rather spiteful" public critic of the government. Tarrant himself wrote that his mission was to "drag villainy to the light, and hold it up to public reprobation ... to aid in raising the Colony from its degradation, to clear it of its dross".

=== Ah Lum and Caldwell affairs ===
In 1857, Tarrant became involved in a series of notable political scandals. In the first case, the so-called Ah Lum affair, Cheung Ah-lum, the proprietor of the Esing Bakery, was accused of plotting to poison European residents of the colony. Despite Cheung's acquittal in court, Tarrant sued him for damages and was awarded HK$1,010. Cheung left Hong Kong, and Tarrant accused William Thomas Bridges, the acting Colonial Secretary, of abetting his escape. Bridges sued Tarrant for libel, the latter being ordered to pay £100 (equivalent to £12,652 in 2023).

Later that year, Tarrant turned his attention to another scandal, the Caldwell affair. As editor of the Friend of China, he helped to publicise allegations that Daniel Richard Caldwell, the Registrar General, had been collaborating with members of the Chinese criminal underworld, including the pirate Ma-chow Wong. The government conducted an inquiry into Caldwell in 1858, in the course of which Tarrant further alleged that, in a "damnable trick", Acting Secretary Bridges had ordered Wong's potentially incriminating account books to be burned to protect Caldwell. The inquiry exonerated Caldwell and Bridges; Tarrant's ally, Attorney General Thomas Chisholm Anstey, was suspended and subsequently dismissed from his office, and the government brought charges against Tarrant for libel. The jury found Tarrant innocent, however, and the evidence from the trial confirmed his claims.

=== Departure from Hong Kong ===
The end of Tarrant's career in Hong Kong came when he was sued once again for libel in September 1859, this time by his old enemy William Caine, now Lieutenant-Governor, against whom Tarrant had waged what was by then a twelve-year public vendetta. He was found guilty, and was fined £50 (equivalent to £6,326 in 2023) and sentenced to twelve months' imprisonment. The Friend of China suspended publication, and without this source of income Tarrant himself faced financial ruin. He spent his time in prison writing letters to other newspapers about abuses in the gaol and, his case having received coverage in the colonial, Indian and United Kingdom press, the concern of the Secretary of State was aroused when Tarrant became the subject of debate in Parliament. Urged by the former, Governor Sir Hercules Robinson remitted half the sentence and, the fine having been raised by a sympathetic public, he was released having served six months, on 20 March 1860. His release was short-lived, however: Bridges obtained an order for costs incurred at trial (at which the entire bar appeared for the prosecution, leaving Tarrant without a barrister) in the enormous sum of HK$2,353. Tarrant was confined in debtors' prison for another four months while members of the public once again raised the necessary sum.

Once he regained his liberty on 4 August 1860, Tarrant left Hong Kong for Canton (Guangzhou), where he restarted the publication of the Friend of China. Publication was suspended again the following year, and in 1862 Tarrant moved with the newspaper to Shanghai, where it appeared from 1864 to 1869. In 1869, he finally sold the Friend of China, and returned to London in poor health in 1870. He died there on 26 January 1872.

== Works ==
Tarrant published a number of books, including the first history of Hong Kong by an Englishman:

- Tarrant, William, ed. (1850). A Digest and Index of all the Ordinances of the Hongkong Government to the Close of 1849. Hong Kong: D. Noronha.
- ——— (1861). Hongkong: A History of Hongkong from the Time of its Cession to the British Empire to the Year 1844. Canton: "Friend of China" Office.
- ——— (1862). Ningpo to Shanghai in 1857: Via the Borders of An-whui Province, Woo-chow-foo and the Grand Canal. Canton: "Friend of China" Office.
