= Governor Bowring =

Governor Bowring may refer to:

- Charles Calvert Bowring (1872–1945), Governor of Nyasaland from 1924 to 1929
- John Bowring (1792–1872), 4th Governor of Hong Kong from 1854 to 1859
