= The Friend of China =

Newspaper in early colonial Hong Kong

- Traditional Chinese: 華友西報
Transcriptions
Standard Mandarin
- Hanyu Pinyin: Huá yǒu xī bào
Yue: Cantonese
- Yale Romanization: Wàh yáu sāi bou
- Jyutping: waa4 jau5 sai1 bou3

The Friend of China was an English-language newspaper in early British Hong Kong and later in China, first published on 17 March 1842.

== History ==
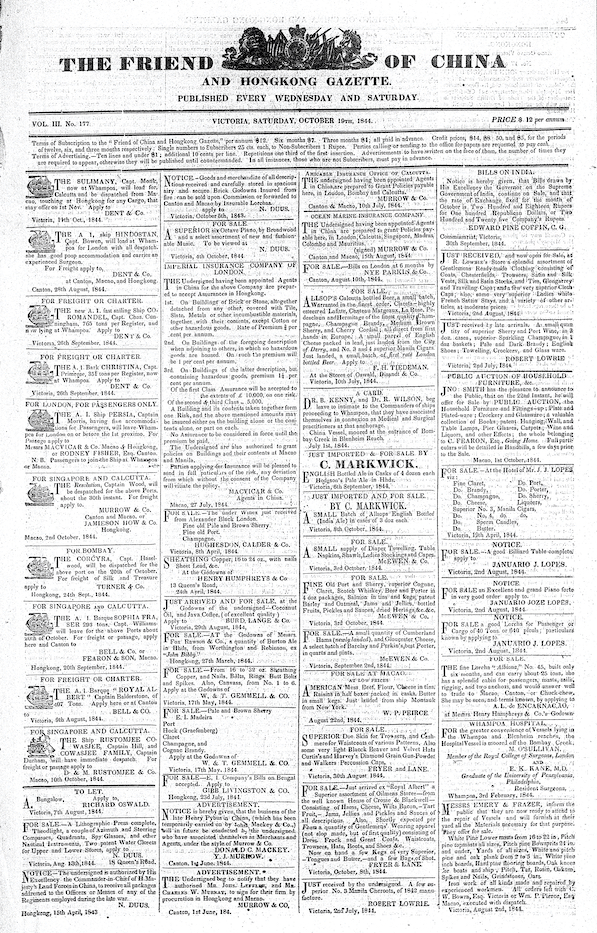
An issue of The Friend of China and Hongkong Gazette published on 19 October 1844

Named after the well-known The Friend of India, The Friend of China was founded as a publication published every Thursday by James White and Reverend John L. Shuck. White had invited Shuck to join the newspaper as a joint editor responsible for production, to allow The Friend of China to be used for Christian mission. It was first owned by Hong Kong merchant Richard Oswald.

Published on 17 March 1842 in Macao, the first issue was a long editorial appealing for financial support and declaring the newspaper's support for opening China to free trade and opposition to opium trade. The second issue on 24 March 1842 was published in Hong Kong as The Friend of China and Hongkong Gazette following a merger with the Hong Kong government gazette, the Hongkong Gazette.

Shuck was likely to have left the newspaper in 1843, and Oswald probably sold it to John Carr some time between 1843 and 1847, when Oswald left Hong Kong. Carr replaced White and Shuck as editor in 1843. It reverted to its old name in 1844.

In 1845, Carr was charged with libel against Rear-Admiral Thomas John Cochrane for publishing an article on 13 July 1844 stating that Cochrane acted "arbitrarily, haughily and unjustly" for paying a schooner an inadequate $100 for servicing HMS Wolf. The jury found Carr not guilty. Some in the community, who disapproved how Cochrane acted and support for him by the Hong Kong government, had reimbursed Carr's costs.

In June 1850, William Tarrant purchased the newspaper and became its editor. As a clerk in the Surveyor General's Department, Tarrant accused the comprador of Colonial Secretary William Caine for extortion. After an internal investigation found his accusations to be groundless, Tarrant was suspended from his post and charged by Caine with conspiracy to damage his reputation. Although the prosectution was ultimately dropped, Acting Governor John Francis Davis removed Tarrant's office, making it impossible for him to be reinstated. He sent letters to the British government calling for his old post and compensation, but they were unsuccessful; he also found account books that directly implicated Caine in the extortion. Under the Tarrant's ownership, The Friend of China adopted a generally antagonistic stance towards the colonial government, especially Caine, and spoke for the interests of the local European merchant community.

In 1858, to prepare for his retirement in England, Tarrant began searching for a buyer for the The Friend of China but found none.

In The Friend of China, Tarrant used the inquiry into the Caldwell affair to criticise Caine and Acting Colonial Secretary William Thomas Bridges. In November 1858, for accusing Bridges of destroying evidence in the inquiry, Tarrant was again charged with libel but was later acquitted. Later in an article published on 24 August 1859 in The Overland Friend of China—a sister publication for consumption in England—he accused Caine of corruption and persecuting him. Before retiring and on the eve of leaving Hong Kong, Tarrant was charged with libel. Hearing began on 17 September, with Bridges representing the government and Tarrant defending himself. On 21 September, the jury found Tarrant guilty and said he did not connect Caine with any alleged corruption "in even the remotest degree". Tarrant sentenced to imprisonment of 12 months, fined £50, and had to pay Bridges the costs of the prosecution. His property was also seized, stopping the operation of The Friend of China.

After his release from prison, Tarrant moved The Friend of China to Canton, where it was published from 13 October 1860 to 28 December 1861. The newspaper was moved again, to Shanghai, from January 1863 to 1869. After the relocation from Hong Kong, the newspaper was less critical than before. Tarrant sold it in 1869 and returned to Britain in 1870.

== Editorial position ==
In its first issue, The Friend of China said it supported Administrator Henry Pottinger, and "direct action" to open up China for free trade. On opium trade, it was "deeply deplore[d]" by the opium addiction in China but also criticised the Chinese government for lackluster action to stop opium from being cultivated, sold or used.

After Carr became editor in 1843, The Friend of China opposed the policies of Pottinger's successor, Governor John Francis Davis.

== See also ==
- Hong Kong Government Gazette
