= Deborah Bowring =

British suffragist and philanthropist (1816–1902)

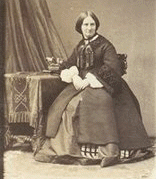
- Born: 30 July 1816
- Died: 28 July 1902 (aged 85); Heavitree, Devon, England
- Known for: Philanthropy
- Spouse: Sir John Bowring

Lady Deborah Bowring born (née Castle; 30 July 1816 – 28 July 1902) was a British suffragist and philanthropist.

== Life ==
She was born in 1816. Her parents were Mary and Thomas Castle and they lived in Clifton near Bristol. Her parents were Unitarian. She was friends with Mary Carpenter, but she had stronger views about the need for women to demand the right to vote.

When she was 42 she married Sir John Bowring on 8 November 1860, who at that time was the Governor of Hong Kong. She was his second wife. Deborah went to live in a new house in Exeter called "Claremont Villa". Her husband had travelled widely as he was a diplomat and linguist. Both of them joined the social circle in Exeter. She encouraged giving at their Unitarian church and she donated money to assist the Children's Band of Mercy, the Royal Devon and Exeter Hospital and the Albert Memorial Museum.

She became a vice-president of the ''Bristol and West of England Society for Women's Suffrage''. Her husband died in 1872 and the following year she published a book of his poetry to which she attached a biography she had written.

In 1879 she was one of the people whose views were quoted in a book regarding women's opinions about women's suffrage. Bowring made the important point that although she paid taxes, she was denied political representation. She also confirmed her strong opinion regarding giving the vote to women.

== Death and legacies ==
Bowring died in Heavitree near Exeter in 1902 still a vice-president of the Bristol and West of England Society for Women's Suffrage. She left a painting and a bust of her husband to the Royal Albert Memorial Museum. Her husband had been one of the museum's founders and they had both supported it.
