= John Cameron (Royal Navy officer) =

Royal Navy Admiral (1874–1939)

Admiral John Cameron CB MVO
- Born: 15 June 1874; London, England
- Died: 28 July 1939 (aged 65)
- Military career
- Allegiance: United Kingdom
- Branch: Royal Navy
- Service years: 1887–1933
- Rank: Admiral
- Commands: HMS Phaeton; HMS Tiger; HMS Glorious; Coast of Scotland
- Conflicts: Second Boer War; World War I
- Awards: Companion of the Order of the Bath; Member of the Royal Victorian Order

Admiral John Ewen Cameron, CB, MVO (15 June 1874 – 28 July 1939) was a Royal Navy officer who became Commander-in-Chief, Coast of Scotland.

== Naval career ==
Born in London, Cameron was commissioned into the Royal Navy in 1887 and went on to fight in the Second Boer War. He served in World War I and took part in the Battle of Jutland as Captain of the cruiser HMS Phaeton. After the War he commanded the battlecruiser HMS Tiger and then the aircraft carrier HMS Glorious.

He was appointed Commander-in-Chief, Coast of Scotland in 1928. He was promoted to vice-admiral on 23 May 1929 and retired the following day. He was promoted to Admiral on the Retired List on 1 September 1933.

He lived at Christon Bank near Embleton in Northumberland.

== Family ==
In 1906 he married Marion Gertrude Granger; they had four daughters.

Military offices
Preceded by Humphrey Bowring	Commander-in-Chief, Coast of Scotland; 1928–1929	Succeeded by Theodore Hallett
