= Minor Morals for Young People =

Work of children's literature

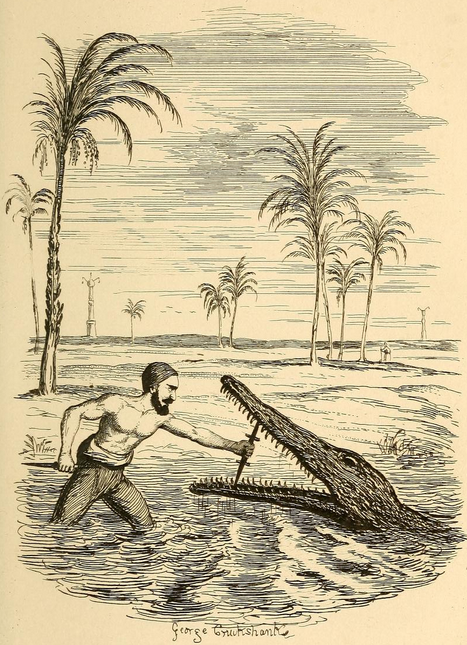
- Author: John Bowring
- Illustrator: George Cruikshank, William Heath
- Published: 1834

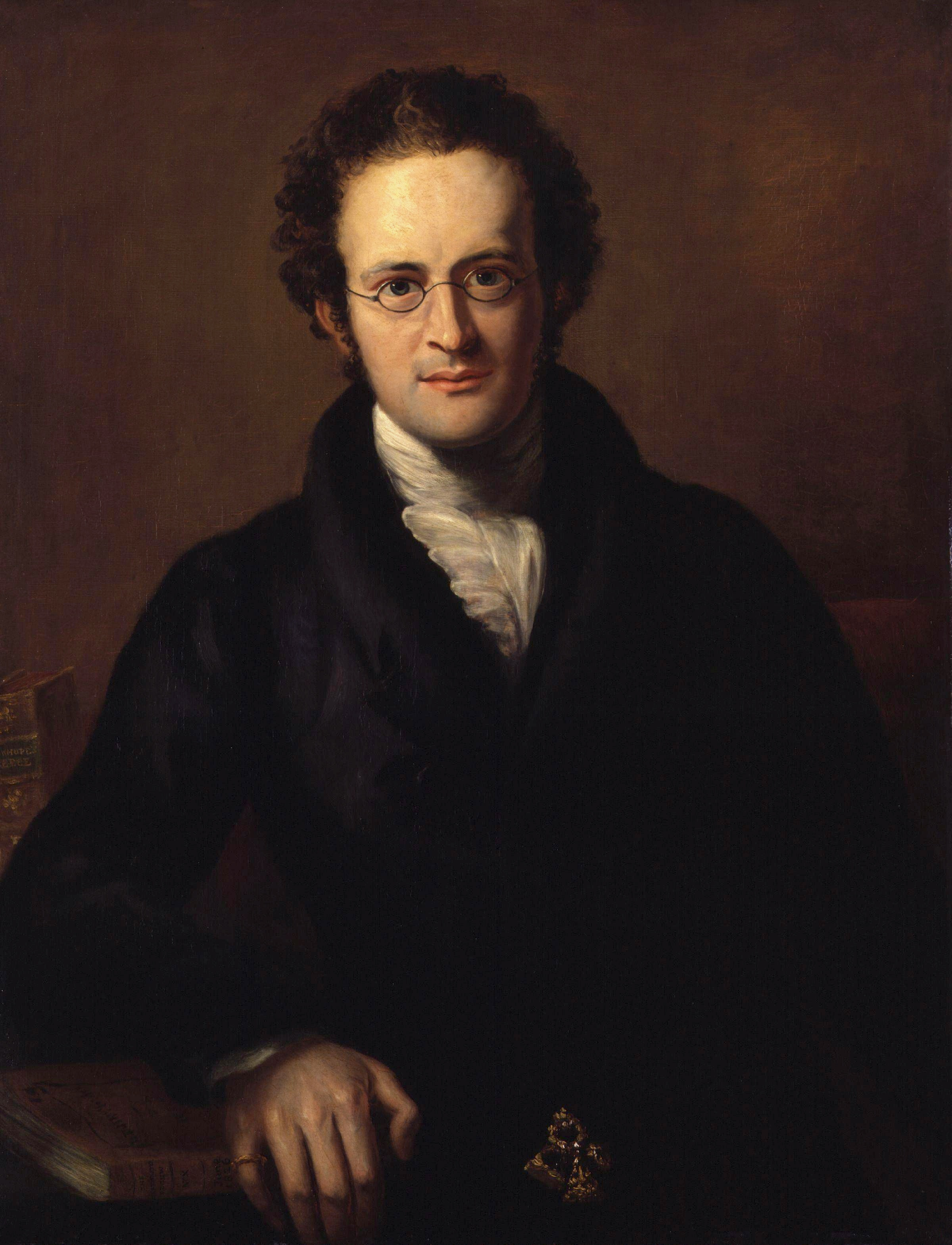
Sir John Bowring, author of Minor Morals for Young People

Minor Morals for Young People is a work of children's literature by John Bowring, published in three parts from 1834 to 1839. The work was illustrated with engravings by George Cruikshank and William Heath.

== Background ==
Sir John Bowring (1792–1872) was an English political economist, traveller, miscellaneous writer, polyglot, and the 4th Governor of Hong Kong. The work strives to educate as well as entertain. A contemporary reviewer argued that the author "has kept view the establishment and nurture of sound principle in young minds". The third volume, published in 1839, focused on "Oriental History" and folklore.

== Early life and education ==
John Bowring was born on 17 October 1792 in Exeter, England, into a Unitarian family. From a young age, he demonstrated a remarkable aptitude for languages. He began working in his father’s business at age 13, which provided him with early exposure to trade and an opportunity to develop his linguistic and commercial skills.

== Contents and synopsis ==
Minor Morals is centered on the Howard family—Mr Howard, a wise father and storyteller, his wife ("Mrs. Howard"), and their three children: Arthur, George, and Edith. Mr. Howard imparts various lessons and tales to his children.

=== Volume I (1834) ===
1. Anger
2. Courage
3. Generosity
4. Intolerance
5. Advice-Giving
6. Presence of Mind
7. Humanity to Animals
8. Veracity
9. Praise and Blame
10. Employment of Time
11. Love of FLowers
12. Perseverance
13. Good-Nature
14. Patience under Censure
15. Mercy
16. Nobility of Skin
17. Order
18. Justice
19. Ancient Times

=== Volume II (1834) ===
1. The Storm
2. Uses of Animals to Man
3. Excellence and Excelling
4. Slavery
5. Swallows
6. Love of Home
7. Commerce
8. Fishes, and Friendly Counsels
9. War
10. Sense and Sensitiveness
11. Mushroom-Hunting
12. Selfishness
13. Affection for Inanimate Objects
14. Prudence
15. Flowers
16. Filial Affection
17. Sounds of the People

=== Volume III (1839) ===
The third volume is dedicated to "Lady Ponsonby". In the preface, the author describes his motive to interest children in "the East". The author describes including genuine folklore, writing: "As to the stories connected with Oriental superstitions, I have recorded them as I heard them".

1. Travels - The Howard children dream of traveling to foreign lands. Mr Howard begins by telling stories of his travels, including a visit to Russia
2. The Sheriff of Mekka - Mr Howard tells a religious discussion he had with a Turkish friend as a demonstration of the good in all peoples and how travel "destroys petty prejudices". Mr. Howard describes meeting the "Sheriff" (cf. Sharif) of the Holy City and their conversations.
3. The Nile - Mr Howard describes an 1837 visit to Egypt's Nile, witnessing a boat accident, crocodiles and a crocodile hunter.
4. Peris - Mr Howard tells the story of a tailor and a Peri that fell in love with the tailor. For three years the tailor and the Peri lived together, after which the Peri left to participate in a war amongst the Peri race. The Peri left him and died in the war, and the tailor vowed never to wed an earthly mortal.
5. The Prince of the Druses - Mr Howard describes the Druze people
6. Treatment of Animals in the East - describes the treatment of dogs and other animals, the eating of locusts, and the legend of the Wandering Jew.
7. Vampires - Mr Howard tells of the Vampire, resulting from "a dead body that... is exposed to the action of the sun's rays" for forty days. A vampire's mission is to "torment and alarm the living". He tells of the vampire hunters, who use a pointed stake through the heart to slay a vampire.
8. Mahomet Ali Pacha
9. Magicians
10. Infant Schools
11. Djezzar Pacha
12. Mahommedanism
13. Djins—Mr. Howard discusses the Djins or genii, which, like ghosts, haunt houses.
14. Sincerity with Prudence
15. Treasure-seeking in the Levant - Mr. Howard shares the tale of a treasure hunt. Finding a treasure, the treasure hunters use ropes and poles in an attempt to prevent the treasure from sinking into the earth. The attempt fails, the chest crashes into the earth, and a monstrous toad results in the treasure hunter being struck down with palsy.
16. Abu Abdallah
