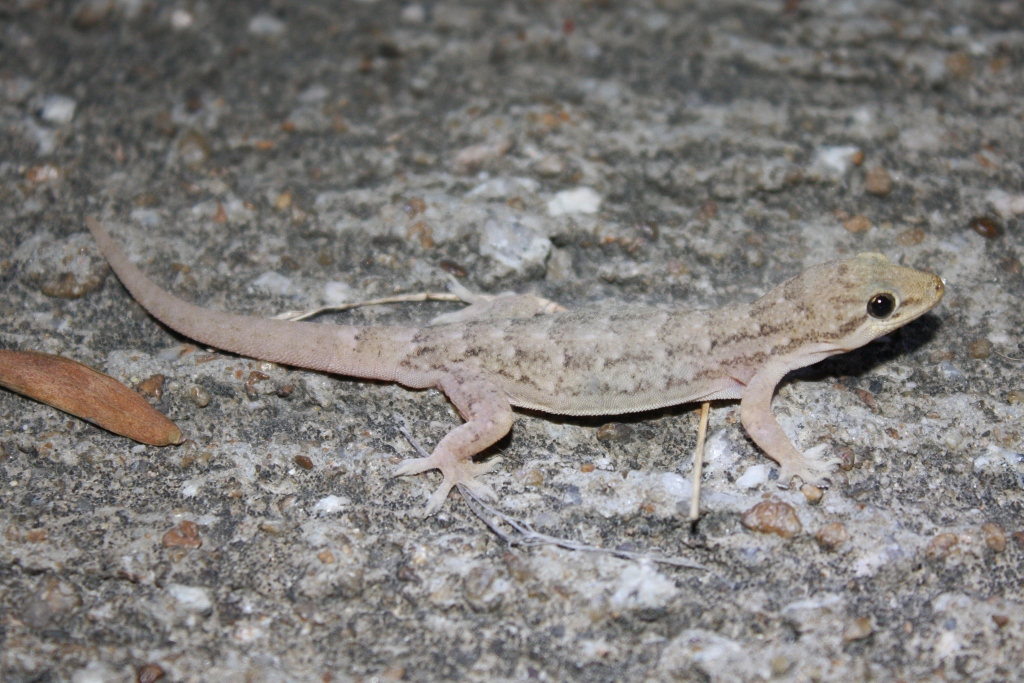

Conservation status
- Least Concern (IUCN 3.1)

Scientific classification
- Kingdom: Animalia
- Phylum: Chordata
- Class: Reptilia
- Order: Squamata
- Suborder: Gekkota
- Family: Gekkonidae
- Genus: Hemidactylus
- Species: H. bowringii

Binomial name
- Hemidactylus bowringii (Gray, 1845)

Synonyms
- Doryura bowringii Gray, 1845; Hemidactylus bowringii — Boulenger, 1885

= Oriental leaf-toed gecko =

Species of lizard

The Oriental leaf-toed gecko (Hemidactylus bowringii), also known commonly as the Asian smooth gecko, Bowring's gecko, Bowring's smooth gecko, and the Sikkimese dark-spotted gecko, is a species of lizard in the family Gekkonidae. The species is native to East Asia.

== Etymology ==
The specific name, bowringii, is in honor of either John Charles Bowring, who was a British amateur naturalist and businessman in Hong Kong, or his father John Bowring, who was a British diplomat and a governor of Hong Kong.

== Description ==
Boulenger (1885) described H. bowringii as follows: "Snout longer than the distance between the eye and the ear-opening, 1.4 times the diameter of the orbit; forehead slightly concave; ear-opening small, roundish. Body and limbs moderate; a slight fold of the skin along the flank. Digits free, moderately dilated, inner well developed; infradigital lamellae obliquely curved, 5 under the thumb, 7 or 8 under the fourth finger, 5 or 6 under the first toe, and 9 or 10 under the fourth toe. Upper surfaces covered with uniform small granular scales, largest on the snout, smallest on the occiput. Rostral four-sided, twice as broad as deep, with median cleft above; nostril pierced between the rostral, the first labial, and three or four nasals; 9 to 11 upper and 7 or 8 lower labials; mental large, triangular, followed by a pair of chin-shields; an outer pair of much smaller chin-shields. Abdominal scales moderate, cycloid, imbricate. Male with a series of preanal pores, interrupted mesially, composed of 13 pores on each side. Tail depressed, rounded, oval in section, covered above with uniform small scales, beneath with a median series of transversely dilated plates. Light brown above, with darker spots, having sometimes a tendency to form four longitudinal bands on the back; frequently small whitish spots on the body and limbs; a dark streak passing through the eye; tail above with small chevron-shaped markings; lower surfaces whitish.

From snout to vent 1.3 in (3.3 cm); tail 2 in (5.1 cm)."

== Geographic range ==
Hemidactylus bowringii is found in East Asia, including Bhutan, Nepal, southern China, Taiwan, Hong Kong, Vietnam (Ha Noi; Hon Thom Island), and Japan (Ryukyu Islands = Okinawa).

== Habitat ==
The preferred natural habitat of H. bowringii is forest, at altitudes from sea level to 1,250 m (4,100 ft), but it has also been found in plantations and around man-made structures in urban areas.

== Reproduction ==
Hemidactylus bowringii is oviparous. Clutch size is 2–3 eggs, which hatch after 30 days of incubation.
