= Bowring Park =

Bowring Park may refer to:

- Bowring Park (St. John's)
- Bowring Park, Knowsley
- Bowring Park, Merseyside
