= Humphrey Bowring =

Royal Navy Admiral (1874–1952)

Admiral Humphrey Bowring CB DSO
- Born: 18 April 1874
- Died: 21 February 1952 (aged 77)
- Military career
- Allegiance: United Kingdom
- Branch: Royal Navy
- Service years: 1887–1929
- Rank: Admiral
- Commands: HMS Arrogant; HMS Aurora; HMS Bellerophon; HMS Centurion; Coast of Scotland
- Conflicts: World War I
- Awards: Companion of the Order of the Bath; Distinguished Service Order

Admiral Humphrey Wykeham Bowring CB DSO (18 April 1874 – 21 February 1952) was a Royal Navy officer who became Commander-in-Chief, Coast of Scotland.

== Naval career ==
Born the son of the industrialist John Charles Bowring, Bowring joined the Royal Navy as a cadet in 1887, took part in the Witu expedition in 1890 and was promoted to Lieutenant in 1895. He served in World War I as Captain of the cruiser HMS Arrogant and then of the cruiser HMS Aurora and acted as Chief of Staff to the Commander-in-Chief, Dover Patrol. After the War he commanded the battleship HMS Bellerophon and then the battleship HMS Centurion. He was appointed Commander-in-Chief, Coast of Scotland in 1926 and retired in 1929. He was promoted to full admiral on the Retired list on 30 September 1933.

He lived at Plympton in Devon.

== Family ==
In 1924 he married Rose Dalby.

Military offices
Preceded by Sir Walter Cowan	Commander-in-Chief, Coast of Scotland; 1926–1928	Succeeded by John Cameron
