= John Charles Bowring =

Hong Kong businessman (1821-1893)

- Born: 24 March 1821
- Died: 20 June 1893 (aged 72)
- Occupation: Businessman
- Parents: John Bowring (father); Maria Lewin (mother)
- Relatives: Lewin Bentham Bowring (brother); Edgar Alfred Bowring (brother); Charles Calvert Bowring (son); Humphrey Bowring (son)

John Charles Bowring (24 March 1821 – 20 June 1893) was a Hong Kong businessman, a partner in the firm Jardine, Matheson & Co., and a keen amateur naturalist and JP for the County of Devon.

He was the eldest son of John Bowring (1792–1872), of Exeter, Devon, Governor of Hong Kong, and accompanied him on some of his travels. He was brother of Lewin Bentham Bowring and Edgar Alfred Bowring.

Bowring was a passionate botanist and entomologist (more specifically a coleopterist; a student in the study of beetles). Throughout his travels with his father, Sir John Bowring, he studied, took notes, and collected certain rare plants and beetles whenever the opportunity presented itself. In 1852 Bowring brought from Hong Kong ferns, mosses, and flowering plants back to England.

In 1862, Bowring built Larkbeare House as his residence in Exeter: the house is on Topsham Road, close to St Leonard's Church, with extensive riverside gardens, designed to house Bowring's plant collection. The house later became judges' lodgings and then a register office for Devon County Council.

His sons included:

- Sir Charles Calvert Bowring, Governor of Nyasaland
- Rear Admiral Humphrey Wykeham Bowring

He left a large collection of coleoptera to the British Museum.

Two species of lizards, Hemidactylus bowringii and Subdoluseps bowringii, are named in honor of John Charles Bowring or his father Sir John Bowring.
