= William Caine (Hong Kong) =

British colonial administrator

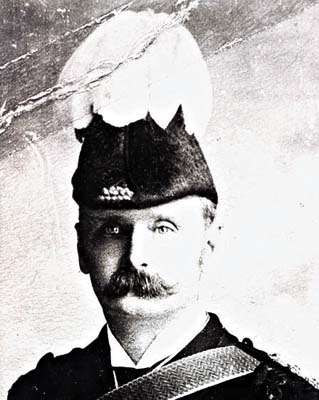
Captain Caine

William Caine (17 March 1799 – 19 September 1871) was the first head of the Hong Kong Police Force (1841–1844 as Chief Magistrate), Colonial Secretary of Hong Kong from 1846 to 1854. He attained the rank of Lieutenant Colonel prior to his secretary appointment. Caine was also the acting Governor of Hong Kong between May and September 1859.

== Biography ==
Captain Caine was born in Maynooth, Ireland, on 17 March 1799. He served in the British Army's 26th (Cameronian) Regiment of Foot during the Peninsular War against Napoleon in Spain. His regiment was later transferred to Hong Kong and he began his long association with the colony.

Caine was Chief Magistrate, the head of pre-Hong Kong Police Force from 1841 to 1844. The then Major Caine was appointed Colonial Secretary and Auditor General from 1846 to 1854. His role was considerably diminished after the arrival in 1849 of the new governor Sir John Bowring who stamped his authority on Hong Kong after his power struggle with Caine went all the way to the Colonial Office for resolution.

He was the Colonial Secretary of Hong Kong from 1854 to 1859. He was the acting Governor of Hong Kong between May and September 1859.

Caine was party to a long-running feud with William Tarrant, who, as Registrar of Deeds in 1847, accused Caine of permitting his comprador to extort vendors in Central Market and siphon prostitutes tax into private pocket. An internal government inquiry held Tarrant's claim to be baseless, and Tarrant was sacked from the civil service and effectively barred from future re-employment. Tarrant then became a journalist and after purchasing the Friend of China newspaper in 1850 repeatedly attacked Caine in its pages until the latter sued Tarrant for libel in 1859, as a result of which Tarrant was sentenced to prison.

Caine had four sons:

- George Whittingham Caine (1832 – 31 January 1874 in Shanghai); a junior clerk in the Plenipotentiary's Department in 1855.
- William Hull Caine
- Henry Monteith Caine
- Charles Henry Fearon Caine

Caine retired and left Hong Kong in 1859. He died on 19 September 1871 in Granville Park, Blackheath, England.

== Namesakes ==
- Caine Road, Mid-Levels, Hong Kong
- Caine House, a 29-floor L-shaped building, part of the Hong Kong Police Headquarters, was built in 1987.

Government offices
Preceded by Adolphus Edward Shelley	Auditor-General of Hong Kong; 1846–1854	Succeeded by William Thomas Mercer
Preceded by Frederick Wright-Bruce	Colonial Secretary of Hong Kong; 1846–1854	Succeeded by William Thomas Mercer
Preceded by John Bowring	Administrator of Hong Kong; Acting; May 1859 – September 1859	Succeeded by Hercules Robinson
