= George Beer Endacott =

British Hong Kong historian

George Beer Endacott (28 February 1901 – September 1971) was a British-born Hong Kong historian.

He was born in South Devon in the West England as a son of railway worker. He was educated at Tavistock Grammar School and Exeter University and became a teacher. In the 1930s, he attended Balliol College, Oxford and read Politics, Philosophy and Economics (PPE), returning to teaching until he entered the Royal Navy in 1942.

During the Second World War he served mainly in the Mediterranean as an interpreter with the French forces. On leaving the Navy in 1946 he took up an appointment as lecturer in History at the University of Hong Kong where he remained until his retirement in 1962. As a historian and author he wrote a number of books including A History of Hong Kong, Fragrant Harbour (with A Hinton) and Government and the People. The manuscript of his last book, Hong Kong Eclipse, was almost finished at the time of his death. It was completed, at the request of the Hong Kong government, by Alan Birch, a senior member of the History Department at the University of Hong Kong who Endacott had asked to read the manuscript.

== Bibliography ==
- Endacott, George Beer and Dorothy E. She (1949). The Diocese of Victoria, Hong Kong. A Hundred Years of Church History, 1849–1949.
- Endacott, G. B. (1973) [1958]. A history of Hong Kong. London: Oxford University Press. ISBN 9780196382647.
- Endacott, G. B. (2005) [1962]. A biographical sketch-book of early Hong Kong. Hong Kong University Press. ISBN 978-9622097421.
- Endacott, G. B.; Hinton, Arthur (1962). Fragrant Harbour. A Short History of Hong Kong. Oxford University Press. ISBN 9780837194561. OCLC 490909282.
- Endacott, G. B. (1964). An Eastern Entrepot: A Collection of Documents Illustrating the History of Hong Kong. Her Majesty's Stationery Office. ASIN B0007J07G6. OCLC 632495979.
- Endacott, G. B. (1964). Government and people in Hong Kong, 1841-1962: A Constitutional History. Hong Kong University Press. ISBN 9780313235955.
- Endacott, George Beer (1967). Fourth Impression.
- Endacott, G. B.; Birch, Alan (1978). Hong Kong Eclipse. Oxford University Press. ISBN 978-0-19-580374-7.
