= John Bowring =

British political economist (1792–1872)

Sir John Bowring KCB FRS FRGS
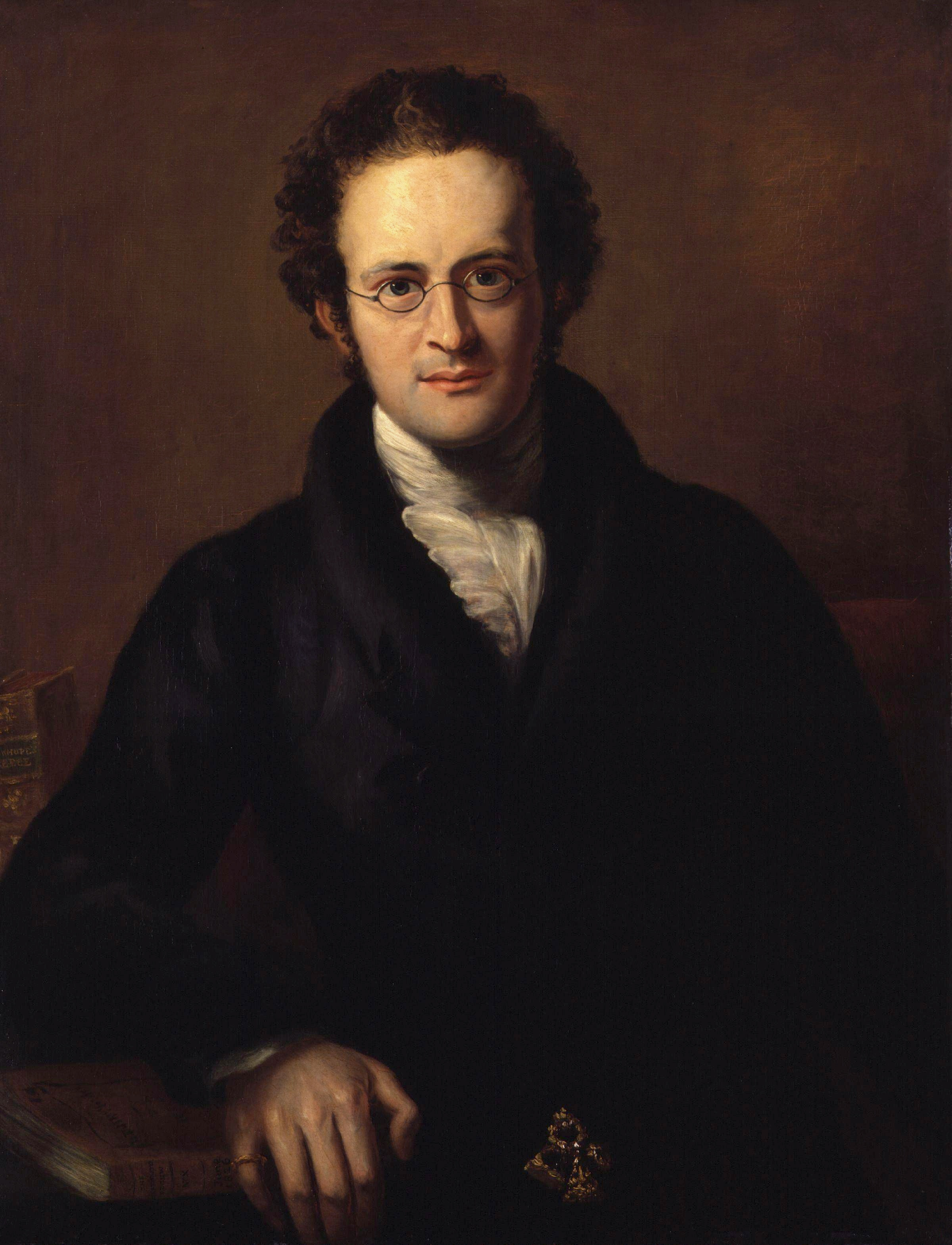
- Bowring in 1826

4th Governor of Hong Kong
- In office 13 April 1854 – 9 September 1859
- Monarch: Victoria
- Lieutenant Governor: MG William Jervois; MG Robert Garrett; MG Thomas Ashburnham; MG Charles van Straubenzee
- Preceded by: Sir George Bonham
- Succeeded by: Hercules Robinson, 1st Baron Rosmead

Member of Parliament for Bolton
- In office 1841–1849 Serving with Peter Ainsworth (1841–1847), William Bolling (1847–1848) and Stephen Blair (1848–1849)
- Preceded by: Peter Ainsworth; William Bolling
- Succeeded by: Stephen Blair; Joshua Walmsley

Member of Parliament for Kilmarnock Burghs
- In office 1835–1837
- Preceded by: John Dunlop
- Succeeded by: John Campbell Colquhoun

Personal details
- Born: 17 October 1792 Exeter, Devon, England
- Died: 23 November 1872 (aged 80) Claremont, Devon, England
- Party: Radical
- Spouses: Maria Lewin (m. 1816; died 1858) Deborah Castle (m. 1860)
- Children: John Charles; Lewin Bentham; Edgar Alfred; Emily Aloysia
- Profession: Member of Parliament (UK)

Chinese name
- Chinese: 寶寧
Transcriptions
Standard Mandarin
- Hanyu Pinyin: bǎo níng
Yue: Cantonese
- Jyutping: bou2 ning4

Thai name
- Thai: พระยาสยามมานุกูลกิจ สยามมิตรมหายศ
- RTGS: Phraya Sayam Manukunkit Sayammit Mahayot

Sir John Bowring, (Note: Chinese: 寶寧, 寶靈) or Phrayā Siam Mānukūlakicca Siammitra Mahāyaśa (Note: Thai: พระยาสยามมานุกูลกิจ สยามมิตรมหายศ, RTGS: Phraya Sayam Manukunkit Sayammit Mahayot, pronounced [pʰráʔ jaː sà jaːm maː núʔ kuːn kìt sà jaːm mít má hǎː jót]) (17 October 1792 – 23 November 1872) was a British political economist, diplomat, traveller, writer, literary translator, polyglot, and colonial governor, who played a key role in many spheres of mid-Victorian public life.

A disciple and literary executor of the philosopher Jeremy Bentham, Bowring edited the Westminster Review and emerged as a prominent Radical politician. As a Member of Parliament (MP), he advocated for political reform, full suffrage, and decimalisation, notably introducing the florin as a first step towards a decimal currency system in Britain. and played a key role in promoting British free trade ideas.

In 1854, Bowring was appointed the fourth Governor of Hong Kong and British plenipotentiary in East Asia. The following year, he was sent by Queen Victoria as an emissary to Siam, where he negotiated the landmark Treaty of Amity and Commerce (commonly known as the "Bowring Treaty"). King Mongkut later appointed him as Siam's Envoy Extraordinary and Minister Plenipotentiary to Europe, granting him a Siamese noble title. The treaty remained in effect for over 70 years until it was renegotiated and fully replaced in 1938 under the government of Plaek Phibunsongkhram.

However, Bowring's governorship in Hong Kong was also marked by severe controversy. In 1856, his handling of the Arrow incident led to the bombardment of Canton and triggered the Second Opium War. In his later years, he served as a British commissioner to the newly formed Kingdom of Italy in 1861 before retiring to Claremont, Devon, where he died on 23 November 1872.

== Early life ==
Bowring was born in Exeter of Charles Bowring (1769–1856), a wool merchant whose main market was China, from an old Unitarian family, and Sarah Jane Anne (d. 1828), the daughter of Thomas Lane, vicar of St Ives, Cornwall. His last formal education was at a Unitarian school in Moretonhampstead and he started work in his father's business at age 13. Bowring at one stage wished to become a Unitarian minister. Espousal of Unitarian faith was illegal in Britain until Bowring had turned 21.

Bowring acquired first experiences in trade as a contract provider to the British army during the Peninsular War in the early 1810s, initially for four years from 1811 as a clerk at Milford & Co. where he began picking up a variety of languages. His experiences in Spain fed a healthy skepticism towards the administrative capabilities of the British military. He travelled extensively and was imprisoned in Boulogne-sur-Mer for six weeks in 1822 for suspected spying (though merely carrying papers for the Portuguese envoy to Paris).

He incorporated Bowring & Co. with a partner in 1818 to sell herring to Spain (including Gibraltar by a subsidiary) and France and to buy wine from Spain. It was during this period that he came to know Jeremy Bentham, and later became his friend. He did not, however, share Bentham's contempt for belles lettres. He was a diligent student of literature and foreign languages, especially those of Eastern Europe. He somehow found time to write 88 hymns during this time, most published between 1823 and 1825.

Failure of his business in 1827, amidst his Greek revolution financing adventure, left him reliant on Bentham's charity and seeking a new, literary direction. Bentham's personal secretary at the time, John Neal, labelled Bowring a "meddling, gossiping, sly, and treacherous man" and charged him with deceiving investors in his Greek adventure and mismanaging Bentham's funds for Bowring's own prestige with the Westminster Review and an early public gymnasium.

== Political economist career ==
Bowring had begun contributing to the newly founded Westminster Review and had been appointed its editor by Bentham in 1825. By his contributions to the Review he attained considerable repute as a political economist and parliamentary reformer. He advocated in its pages the cause of free trade long before it was popularized by Richard Cobden and John Bright, co-founders of the Anti-Corn Law League in Manchester in 1838: "Jesus Christ is Free Trade, and Free Trade is Jesus Christ."

He pleaded earnestly on behalf of parliamentary reform, Catholic emancipation, and popular education. Bentham failed in an attempt to have Bowring appointed professor of English or History at University College London in 1827 but, after Bowring visited the Netherlands in 1828, the University of Groningen conferred on him the degree of doctor of laws in February the next year for his Sketches of the Language and Literature of Holland. In 1830, he was in Denmark, preparing for the publication of a collection of Scandinavian poetry. As a member of the 1831 Royal Commission, he advocated strict parliamentary control on public expenditure, and considered the ensuing reform one of his main achievements. Till 1832, he was Foreign Secretary of the British and Foreign Unitarian Association.

Bowring was appointed Jeremy Bentham's literary executor a week before the latter's 1832 death in his arms, and was charged with the task of preparing a collected edition of his works. The appointment was challenged by a nephew but Bowring prevailed in court. The work appeared in eleven volumes in 1843, notably omitting Bentham's most controversial works on female sexuality and homosexuality.

Free trade took on the dimensions of faith to Bowring who, in 1841, quipped, "Jesus Christ is free trade and free trade is Jesus Christ", adding, in response to consternation at the proposition, that it was "intimitely associated with religious truth and the exercise of religious principles".

== Politician industrialist ==
Through Bentham connections and in spite of his radicalism, Bowring was appointed to carry out investigations of the national accounting systems of the Netherlands and France in 1832 by the government and House of Commons, respectively. The mark left by his work in France was not welcomed by all; as one commentator remarked,

Of all men, high or low, that I ever met in society, this Dr Bowring is the most presuming and the most conceited. He is a fit charlatan, for Whig employment; pushing and overbearing in his manner, and, like other parvenus, assuming an official importance which is highly ridiculous.

Yet his work was so highly regarded by the Whig government that he was then appointed secretary of the Royal Commission on the Public Accounts. He had made his name as something of an expert on government accounting. He stood the same year for the newly created industrial constituency of Blackburn but was unsuccessful.

In 1835, Bowring entered parliament as member for Kilmarnock Burghs; and in the following year he was appointed head of a government commission to be sent to France to inquire into the actual state of commerce between the two countries. After losing his seat in 1837, he was busied in further economic investigations in Egypt, for which he produced a very extensive report, as well as Syria, Switzerland, Italy, and some of the states in Imperial Germany. The results of these missions appeared in a series of reports laid before the House of Commons and even a paper delivered to the British Association of Science with his observations on containment of the plague in the Levant. He also spoke out passionately for equal rights for women and the abolition of slavery.

Bowring appears in this painting of the 1840 World's Anti-Slavery Convention. Move your cursor to identify him on the second row to the right or click the icon to enlarge

On a still narrow, landed constituency, Bowring, campaigning on a radical and, to Marx and Engels, inconsistent platform of free trade and Chartism, secured a seat in parliament in 1841, as member for Bolton, perhaps England's constituency most affected by industrial upheaval and riven by deep social unrest bordering on revolution. In the House, he campaigned for free trade, adoption of the Charter, repeal of the Corn Laws, improved administration of the Poor Law, open borders, abolition of the death penalty, and an end to flogging in the Army and payments to Church of England prelates.

During this busy period he found leisure for literature, and published in 1843 a translation of the Manuscript of the Queen's Court, a collection of Czech medieval poetry, later considered false by Czech poet Václav Hanka. In 1846 he became President of the Mazzinian People's International League.

Without inherited wealth, or salary as MP for Bolton, Bowring sought to sustain his political career by investing heavily in the south Wales iron industry from 1843. Following huge demand for iron rails brought about by parliament's approval of massive railway building from 1844 to 1846, Bowring led a small group of wealthy London merchants and bankers as Chairman of the Llynvi Iron Company and established a large integrated ironworks at Maesteg in Glamorgan during 1845–46. He installed his brother, Charles, as Resident Director and lost no time in naming the district around his ironworks, Bowrington. He gained a reputation in the Maesteg district as an enlightened employer, one contemporary commenting that 'he gave the poor their rights and carried away their blessing'.

In 1845 he became Chairman of the London and Blackwall Railway, the world's first steam-powered urban passenger railway and the precursor of the whole London Rail system.

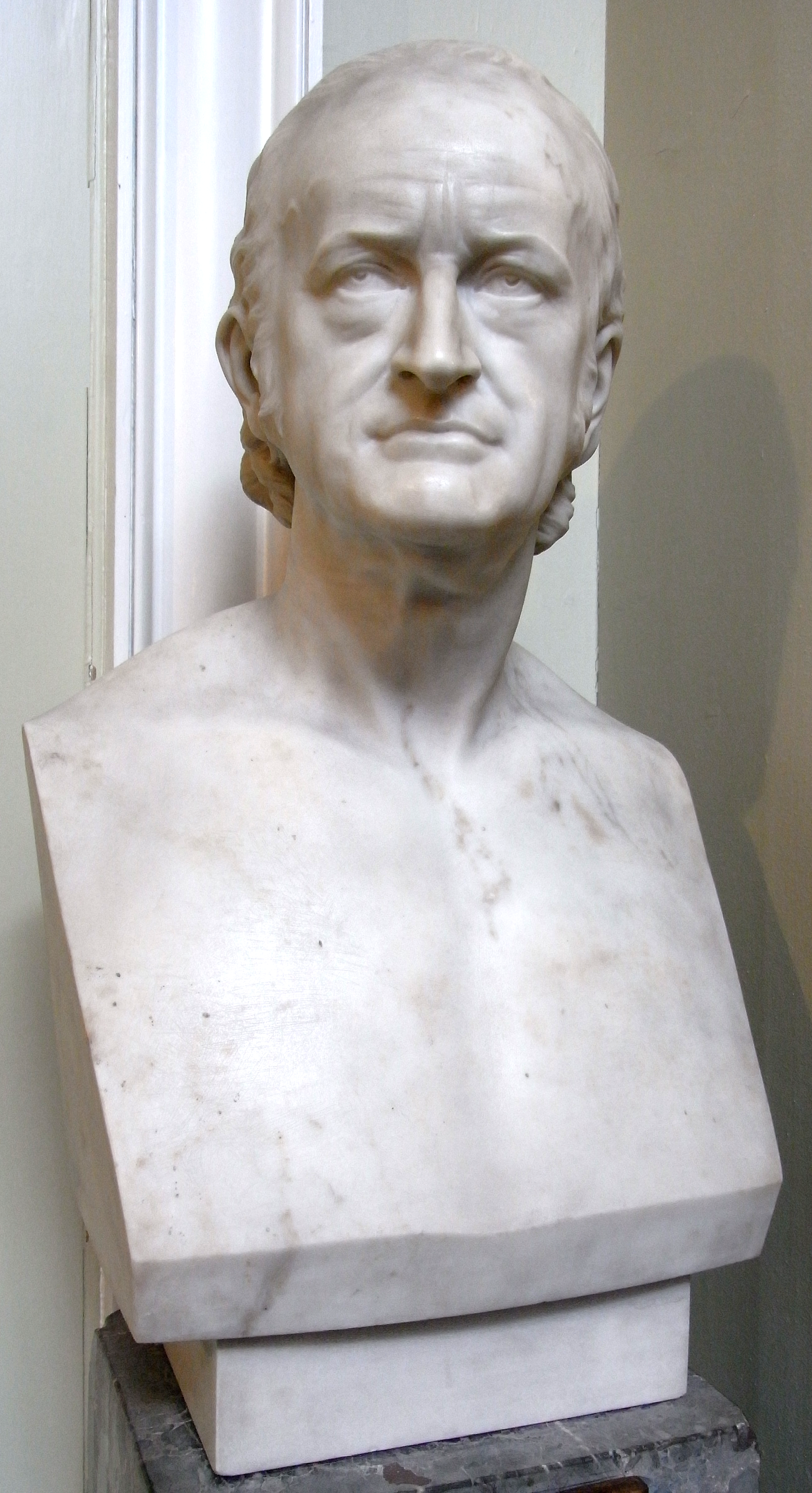
Marble bust of Bowring by Edward Bowring Stephens (1815–1882) of Exeter. Collection of Devon and Exeter Institution, Exeter, of which he was president 1860–1861

Bowring distinguished himself as an advocate of decimal currency. On 27 April 1847, he addressed the House of Commons on the merits of decimalisation. He agreed to a compromise that directly led to the issue of the florin (one-tenth of a pound sterling), introduced as a first step in 1848, by way of pattern coins not issued for circulation, and in 1849 as a circulating coin known as the 'Godless' Florin due to it omitting the words 'DEI GRATIA' in the obverse legend. As the 1849 coins proved unpopular, the coins were redesigned accordingly and went into general production 3 years later in 1852 and became known as 'Gothic Head' Florins remaining in production until 1887. He lost his seat in 1849 but went on to publish a work entitled The Decimal System in Numbers, Coins and Accounts in 1854.

The trade depression of the late 1840s caused the failure of his venture in south Wales in 1848 and wiped out his capital, forcing Bowring into paid employment. His business failure led directly to his acceptance of Palmerston's offer of the consulship at Canton.

== Canton ==
By 1847, Bowring had assembled an impressive array of credentials: honorary diplomas from universities in Holland and Italy, fellowships of the Linnean Society of London and Paris, the Historical Institute of the Scandinavian and Icelandic Societies, the Royal Institute of the Netherlands, the Royal Society of Hungary, the Royal Society of Copenhagen, and of the Frisian and Athenian Societies. Numerous translations and works on foreign languages, politics and economy had been published. His zeal in Parliament and standing as a literary man were well known.

In 1849, he was appointed British consul at Canton (today's Guangzhou), and superintendent of trade in China. Arriving on HMS Medea on 12 April 1849, he took up the post in which he was to remain for four years the next day. His son John Charles had preceded him to China, arriving in Hong Kong in 1842, had been appointed Justice of the Peace and was at one point a partner in Jardines.

Bowring was quickly appalled by endemic corruption and frustrated by finding himself powerless in the face of Chinese breaches of the Treaty of Nanking and refusal to receive him at the diplomatic level or permit him to travel to Peking, and by his being subordinate to the Governor of Hong Kong who knew nothing of his difficulties.

For almost a year from 1852 to 1853, he acted as Britain's Plenipotentiary and Superintendent of Trade and Governor of Hong Kong in the absence on leave of Sir George Bonham, who he was later to succeed.

Bowring was instrumental in the 1855 formation of the Board of Inspectors established under the Qing Customs House, operated by the British to gather statistics on trade on behalf of the Qing government and, later, as the Chinese Imperial Maritime Customs Service, to collect all customs duties. This was a vital reform which brought an end to the corruption of government officials and led modernisation of China's international trade. Concerned for the welfare of coolies being exported to Australia, California, Cuba and the West Indies, and disturbed by the coolie revolt in Amoy in May 1852, Bowring tightened enforcement of the Passenger Act so as to improve coolie transportation conditions and ensure their voluntariness.

== Governor of Hong Kong ==
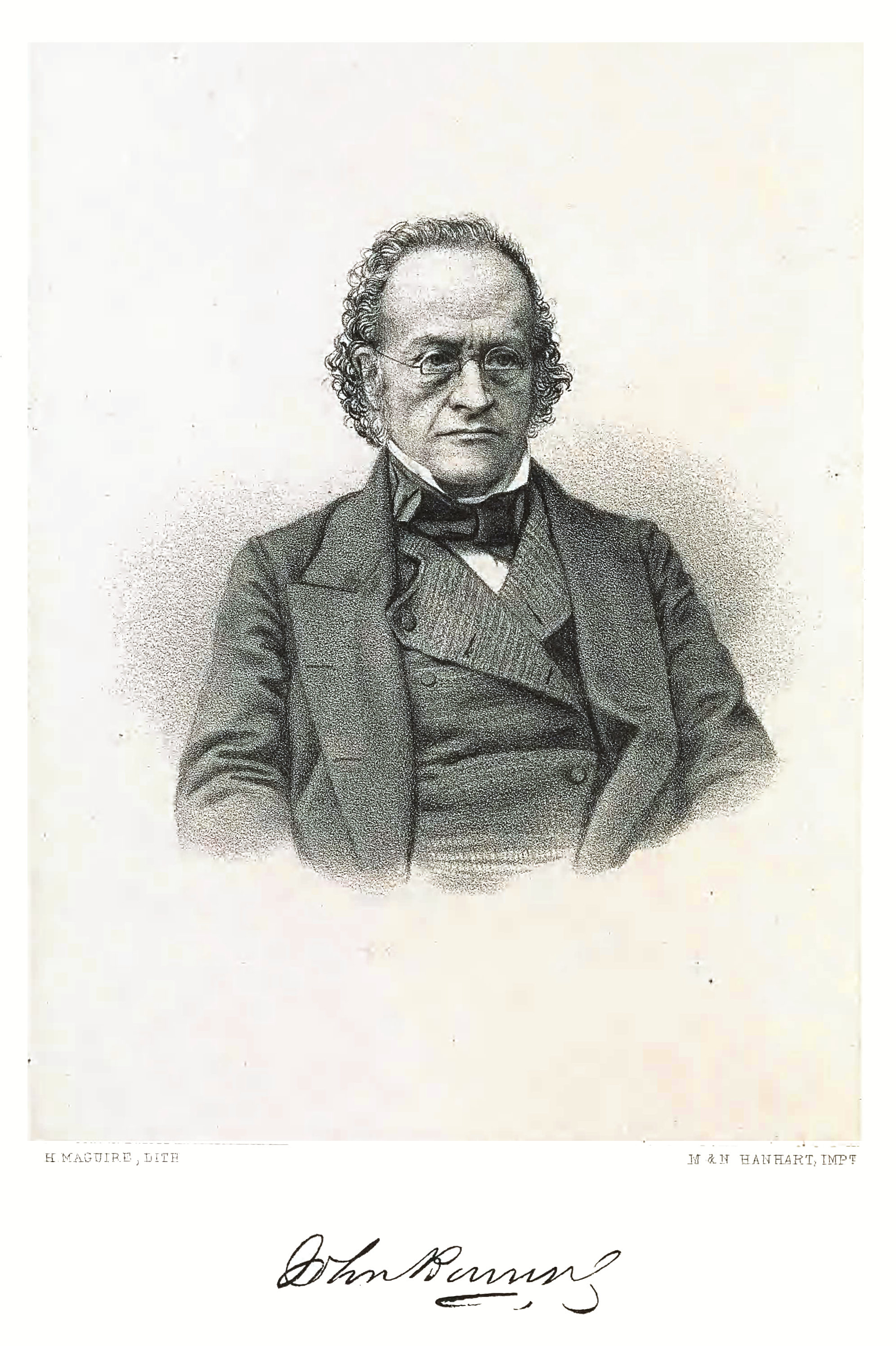
Sir John Bowring, 4th Governor of Hong Kong

The newly knighted Bowring received his appointment as Governor of Hong Kong, Her Majesty's Plenipotentiary, and Chief Superintendent of British Trade in China on 10 January 1854, alongside holding the titles of Commander-in-Chief and Vice-Admiral of Hong Kong. He arrived in the colony and was sworn in on 13 April 1854, in the midst of the Taiping Rebellion occupying the attentions of his primary protagonists and the Crimean War distracting his masters. He was appointed over strong objections from opponents in London. Fellow Unitarian Harriet Martineau had warned that Bowring was "no fit representative of Government, and no safe guardian of British interests", that he was dangerous and would lead Britain into war with China, and that he should be recalled. Her pleas went unheeded.

Bowring was an extremely industrious reformist governor. He allowed the Chinese citizens in Hong Kong to serve as jurors in trials and become lawyers. He is credited with establishing Hong Kong's first commercial public water supply system. He developed the eastern Wan Chai area at a river mouth near Happy Valley and Victoria Harbour by elongating the river as a canal, the area being named Bowring City (Bowrington). By instituting the Buildings and Nuisances Ordinance, No. 8 of 1856, in the face of stiff opposition, Bowring ensured the safer design of all future construction projects in the colony. He sought to abolish monopolies.

Bowring was impressed by the yawning gulf of misunderstanding between the expatriate and Chinese communities, writing, "We rule them in ignorance and they submit in blindness." Notwithstanding, in 1856, Bowring went so far as to attempt democratic reform. He proposed that the constitution of the Legislative Council be changed to increase membership to 13 members, of whom five be elected by landowners enjoying rents exceeding 10 pounds, but this was rejected by Henry Labouchère of the Colonial Office on the basis that Chinese residents were "deficient in the essential elements of morality on which social order rests". The constituency would only have amounted to 141 qualified electors, in any event.

He was equally impressed by the dearth of expenditure on education, noting that 70 times more was provided for policing than for instruction of the populace, so he rapidly brought in an inspectorate of schools, training for teachers and opening of schools. Student number increased nearly ten-fold.

He became embroiled in numerous conflicts and disputes, not least of which was a struggle for dominance with Lieutenant Governor William Caine, which went all the way back to the Colonial Office for resolution. He won. He was faulted for failing to prevent a scandalous action in slander, in 1856, by the assistant magistrate W. H. Mitchell against his attorney-general T. Chisholm Anstey over what was essentially a misapprehension of fact but which was thought "unique in all the scandals of modern government of the Colonies or of English Course of Justice".

A Qing-sponsored campaign of civil disruption, threatening the very survival of the British administration, culminated in the Esing Bakery incident of 15 January 1857 in which 10 pounds of arsenic was mixed in the flour of the colony's principal bakery, poisoning many hundreds, killing Bowring's wife and debilitating him for at least a year. This was a turning point for Bowring who, cornered, all but abandoned his liberality in favour of sharply curtailed civil liberties. He bemoaned:

It is a perplexing position to know that a price is set on our heads, that our servants cannot be trusted, that a premium is offered to any incendiary who will set fire to our dwellings, to any murderer who will poison or destroy us. ... We have many grievances to redress, and I will try to redress them; many securities to obtain, and I mean to obtain them. ... many unfortunate wretches of all nations (as the hatred of the Chinese is indiscriminating) have been seized, decaptitated; and their heads have been exposed on the walls of Canton, their assailants having been largely rewarded; ... All this is sufficiently horrible ... we shall exact indemnities for the past, and obtain securities for the future. We shall not crouch before assassination and incendiarism ... I did all that depended upon me to promote conciliation and establish peace. ... but every effort I made was treated with scorn and repulsion. The forbearance with which the Chinese have been treated has been wholly misunderstood by them, and attributed to our apprehensions of their great power, and awe of the majesty of the 'Son of Heaven'. So they have disregarded the most solemn engagements of treaties, and looked upon us as 'barbarians,' ... I doubt not that Government, Parliament, and public opinion will go with us in this great struggle, ...

== Diplomacy ==
In 1855, Bowring experienced a reception in Siam that could not have stood in starker contrast to Peking's constant intransigence. He was welcomed like foreign royalty, showered with pomp (including a 21-gun salute), and his determination to forge a trade accord was met with the open-minded and intelligent interest of King Mongkut. Negotiations were buoyed by the cordiality between Mongkut and Bowring and an agreement was reached on 17 April 1855, now commonly referred to as the Bowring Treaty. Bowring held Mongkut in high regard and that the feeling was mutual and enduring was confirmed by his 1867 appointment as Siam's ambassador to the courts of Europe. Bowring's delight in this "remarkable" monarch has been seen by at least one commentator as a possible encouragement to his frustration with Peking and rash handling of the Arrow affair.

== War and late career ==
In October 1856, a dispute broke out with the Canton vice-consul Ye Mingchen over the Chinese crew of a small British-flagged trading vessel, the Arrow. Bowring saw the argument as an opportunity to wring from the Chinese the free access to Canton which had been promised in the Treaty of Nanking but so far denied. The irritation caused by his "spirited" or high-handed policy led to the Second Opium War (1856–1860). Martineau put the war down to the "incompetence and self-seeking rashness of one vain man".

It was under Bowring that the colony's first ever bilingual English-Chinese law, "An Ordinance for licensing and regulating the sale of prepared opium" (Ordinance No. 2 of 1858), appeared on its statute books.

In April the same year, Bowring was the subject of scandal when the case of criminal libel against the editor of the Daily Press, Yorick J. Murrow, came to trial. Murrow had written of Bowring's having taken numerous steps to favour the trade of his son's firm, Messrs Jardine, Matheson & Co., enriching it as a result. Murrow, having been found guilty by the jury, emerged from six months' imprisonment to take up precisely where he left off, vilifying Bowring from his press. The scandal was rekindled in December when Murrow brought an ultimately unsuccessful suit in damages against Bowring in connection with his imprisonment.

A commission of inquiry into accusations of corruption, operating brothels and associating with leading underworld figures laid by Attorney-General Anstey against Registrar-General Daniel R Caldwell scandalised the administration. During the course of its proceedings Anstey had opportunity to viciously accuse William Thomas Bridges, one-time acting Attorney-General and constant favourite of Bowring, for receiving stolen goods under the guise of running a money-lending operation from the ground floor of his residence, collecting debts at extortionate rates. The charges found unproved, Caldwell was exonerated and Anstey suspended, and Bridges later to be appointed acting Colonial Secretary by Bowring, but suspicions remained and Bowring's administration had been ruined.

In mourning for the recent loss of his wife to the arsenic poisoning, Bowring made an official tour of the Philippines, sailing on the steam-powered paddle frigate Magicienne on 29 November 1858, returning seven weeks later.

Stripped of his diplomatic and trade powers, weakened by the effects of the arsenic, and seeing his administration torn apart by anti-corruption inquiries in a campaign launched by him, Bowring's work in Hong Kong ended in May 1859. His parting sentiment was that "a year of great embarrassment ... unhappy misunderstandings among officials, fomented by passionate partisanship and by a reckless and slanderous press, made the conduct of public affairs one of extreme difficulty." He plunged into writing a 434-page account of his Philippines sojourn which was published the same year.

His last employment by the British government was as a commissioner to Italy in 1861, to report on British commercial relations with the new kingdom. Bowring subsequently accepted the appointment of minister plenipotentiary and envoy extraordinary from the Hawaiian government to the courts of Europe, and in this capacity negotiated treaties with Belgium, the Netherlands, Italy, Spain and Switzerland.

== Linguist and author ==
Memorial column to Sir John Bowring in Kiskunfélegyháza, Hungary, honoring him as a translator of Petőfi's works

Bowring was an accomplished polyglot and claimed he knew 200 languages of which he could speak 100. Many of his contemporaries and subsequent biographers thought otherwise. (Note: Philip Bowring's 2014 observation (p. 50) responds to a version of this biography: 'The claim to fluency in dozens of languages was exaggerated, yet it has survived in some accounts today: Wikipedia describes him as "ranked ... among the world's greatest hyperglots—his talent enabling him at last to say that he knew 200 languages, and could speak 100".[note] Many of his contemporaries took the claims with a pinch of salt. Bowring's linguistic abilities became the butt of jokes in some quarters, not only among his enemies.') His chief literary work was the translation of the folk-songs of most European nations, although he also wrote original poems and hymns, and books or pamphlets on political and economic subjects. The first fruits of his study of foreign literature appeared in Specimens of the Russian Poets (1821–1823). These were followed by Batavian Anthology (1824), Ancient Poetry and Romances of Spain (1824), Specimens of the Polish Poets, and Serbian Popular Poetry, both in 1827, and Poetry of the Magyars (1830).

Bowring's 88 published hymns include "God is love: his mercy brightens", "In the Cross of Christ I glory", and "Watchman, tell us of the night". "In the Cross" and "Watchman", both from his privately published collection Hymns (1825), are still used in many churches. The American composer Charles Ives used part of Watchman, Tell Us of the Night in the opening movement of his Fourth Symphony.

Selected publications:

- Specimens of the Russian Poets (1821–1823)
- Peter Schlemihl, translated from German (1824)
- Batavian Anthology; or, Specimens of the Dutch Poets (1824)
- Ancient Poetry and Romances of Spain (1824)
- Hymns (privately published, 1825)
- Matins and Vespers with Hymns and Occasional Devotional Pieces (1827)
- Specimens of the Polish Poets (1827)
- Serbian Popular Poetry (1827)
- Poetry of the Magyars (1830)
- Cheskian Anthology (1832)
- Bentham's Deontology, edited (1834) vol. 1, vol. 2
- Minor Morals for Young People (1834)
- Manuscript of the Queen's Court (1843)
- The Decimal System in Numbers, Coins and Accounts (1854)
- The Kingdom and People of Siam (1857), with foreword by King Mongkut
- A Visit to the Philippine Islands (1859)
- Translations from Alexander Petőfi (1866)

== Personal life ==
John Bowring and Deborah Castle

Bowring married twice. By his first wife, Maria (1793/94–1858), whom he married in 1818 after moving to London, he had five sons and four daughters (Maria, John, Frederick, Lewin, Edgar, Charles, Edith, Emily, and Gertrude). She died in September 1858, a victim of the arsenic poisoning of the bread supply in Hong Kong during the Second Opium War sparked by her husband.

- His son John Charles was a keen amateur entomologist, ultimately amassing a collection of some 230,000 specimens of coleoptera which he donated to the British Museum in 1866.
- His fourth son, Edgar Alfred Bowring, was a Member of Parliament for Exeter from 1868 to 1874. E. A. Bowring is also known as an able translator in the literary circles of the time.
- Lewin Bentham Bowring was a member of the Bengal Civil Service. He served as private secretary in India to Lord Canning and Lord Elgin, and later as commissioner of Mysore.
- His daughter, Emily, became a Roman Catholic nun and was known as Sister Emily Aloysia Bowring. She was the first headmistress of the Italian Convent School (now known as the Sacred Heart Canossian College) in Hong Kong, serving from 1860 until her death in 1870.

Bowring married his second wife, Deborah Castle (1816–1902), in 1860; they had no children. Deborah, Lady Bowring died in Exeter in July 1902. She was a prominent Unitarian Christian and supporter of the women's suffrage movement.

John Bowring died on 23 November 1872, aged 80.

== Honours ==
- Knight Commander of the Order of the Bath (KCB), 1854
- Knight Grand Cross of the Royal Order of Kamehameha I of the Kingdom of Hawaii, 1857.
- Fellow, Royal Society and Royal Geographical Society
- Phrayā Siam Mānukūlakicca Siammitra Mahāyaśa (Honorary Lord Royal Fellow of Siam: พระยาสยามานุกูลกิจ สยามิตรมหายศ)
- Elected a member of the American Antiquarian Society in 1834.

== Legacy ==
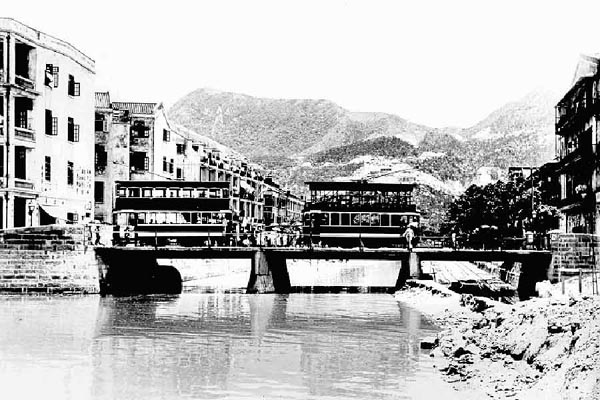
Bowrington Canal in the 1920s

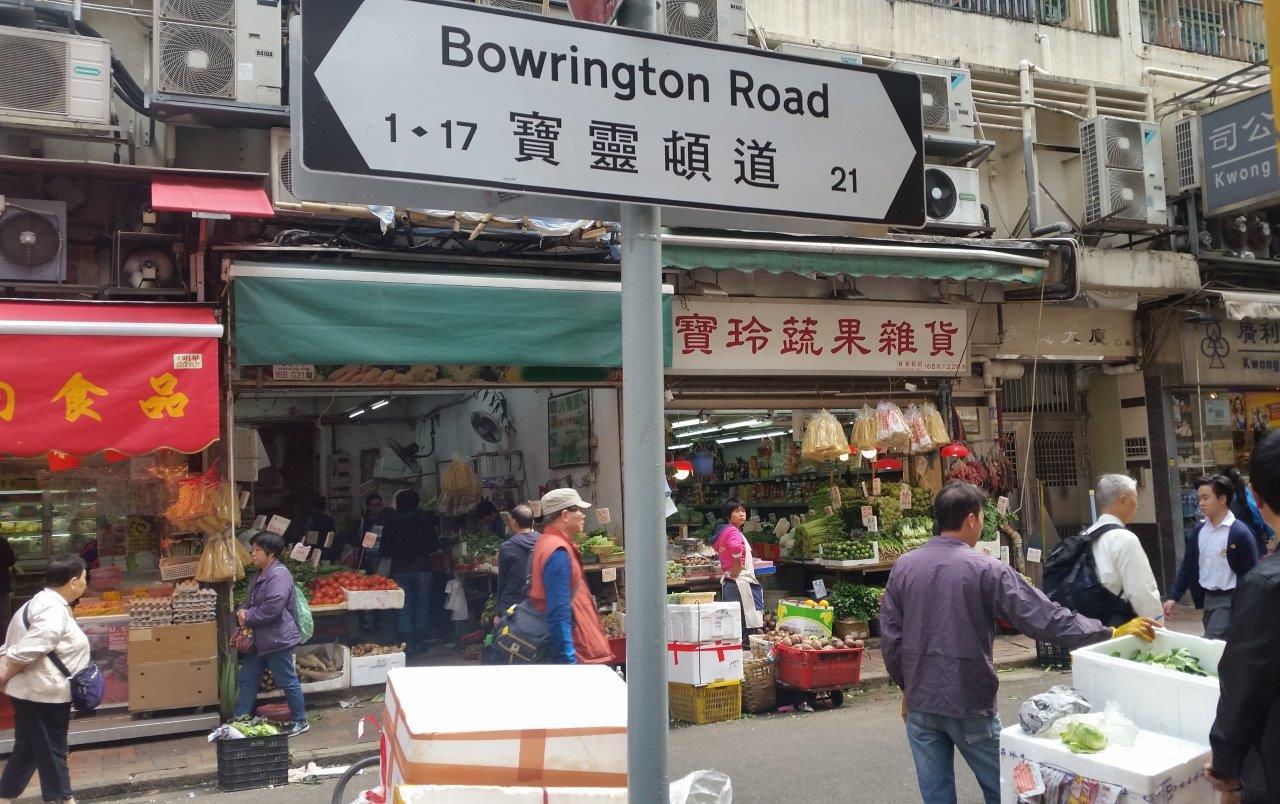
Bowrington Road, Hong Kong, in 2017

Bowring is credited with popularising Samuel Taylor Coleridge's Kubla Khan or a Vision in a Dream which had been disparaged by the critics and discarded soon after first publication.

In the mid-19th century a district of the Llynfi Valley, Glamorgan, south Wales was known as Bowrington as it was built up when John Bowring was chairman of the local iron company. Bowring's ironworks community later became part of the Maesteg Urban District. The name was revived in the 1980s when a shopping development in Maesteg was called the Bowrington Arcade.

Bowring Road, Ramsey, Isle of Man, was named for him in appreciation of his support of universal suffrage for the House of Keys and his efforts to liberalise trade with the island.

As the 4th Governor, several places in Hong Kong came to be named after him:

- Bowring Praya West and Bowring Praya Central were two roads built on reclaimed land during his tenure, but were respectively renamed Des Voeux Road West and Des Voeux Road Central in 1890 after the Praya Reclamation Scheme.
- Bowrington, or Bowring City, is an area Bowring originally built around the estuary of the Wong Nai Chung river, and is the site of the Bowrington Market. He built an extension named the Bowrington Canal, over which the original Bowrington Road (now called Canal Road) and the Bowrington Bridge passed. A road running parallel to and one block to the west of Canal Road retains the name Bowrington Road and houses the street market which serves the district.
- Bowring Street in the district of Jordan, Hong Kong

He was also responsible for the establishment of the Botanic Gardens in Hong Kong, the most indelible mark he made on the colony.

Two species of lizards, Hemidactylus bowringii and Subdoluseps bowringii, are named in honour of either John Bowring or his son John Charles Bowring.

Bowring was the founder of Hastings Unitarian Church in Hastings, East Sussex, which was built between 1867 and 1868.

Actress Susannah York was the great-great-granddaughter of Bowring.

Journalist and historian Philip Bowring is a descendant of Bowring's great uncle Nathaniel. He is the author of a partial biography of Bowring, Free Trade's First Missionary (2014).

== Notes ==
Parliament of the United Kingdom
| Preceded by John Dunlop | Member of Parliament for Kilmarnock Burghs; 1835–1837 | Succeeded by John Campbell Colquhoun |
| Preceded by Peter Ainsworth and William Bolling | Member of Parliament for Bolton; 1841–1849; With: Peter Ainsworth, to 1847; William Bolling, 1847–1848; Stephen Blair, from 1848 | Succeeded by Stephen Blair and Sir Joshua Walmsley |
Government offices
| Preceded by Sir George Bonham | Governor of Hong Kong; 1854–1859 | Succeeded by William Caine (Administrator) |
