= William Thomas Bridges =

The Honourable William Thomas Bridges
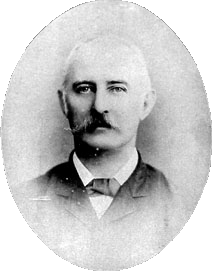
- Born: 1820 or 1821; Blackheath, Kent, England
- Died: 30 September 1894 (aged 73–74); Bath, Somerset, England
- Occupation: Barrister

William Thomas Bridges (1820 or 1821 – 30 September 1894; Chinese: 必列者士; Cantonese Yale: Bītlihtjésih) was a lawyer and public servant in British Hong Kong, where he held the post of Acting Colonial Secretary from 1857 to 1858. He was born in 1820 or 1821 in Blackheath, Kent. Having studied at Winchester College and Corpus Christi College, Oxford, Bridges was called to the Bar at the Middle Temple in 1847. He emigrated to Hong Kong in April 1851 and rose rapidly in local society owing to his special status as a qualified barrister in a colony short of legal experts, becoming Acting Attorney General within a year of his arrival. After a sojourn in England in 1856, where he was awarded an honorary Doctorate of Civil Law, Bridges became a provisional member of the Executive and Legislative Councils upon his return to Hong Kong, and was appointed Acting Colonial Secretary while the incumbent secretary, William Thomas Mercer, was on leave in 1857.

In 1856, Thomas Chisholm Anstey arrived in Hong Kong as Attorney General, and his campaigns to root out official corruption rapidly made an enemy of Bridges. Soon afterwards, in 1858, Bridges became prominently involved in a major local scandal when Anstey accused Daniel Richard Caldwell, responsible as Registrar General for policy towards the local Chinese community, of corruption and favourable treatment of an influential Chinese pirate, Ma-chow Wong (黃墨洲). Bridges was a friend of Caldwell and a fellow Freemason, and moved to protect him by ordering Wong's potentially incriminating account books to be destroyed. An initial inquiry acquitted Caldwell and Bridges in 1858; Governor John Bowring recommended Bridges' advancement within the administration, tipping him as a future Attorney General. The controversy surrounding the Caldwell affair continued, however, and after Bowring's departure in 1859 his successor as governor, Hercules Robinson, reopened the case and commenced a new inquiry in 1860, which recommended Caldwell's dismissal. Under fire from the press and facing the prospect of removal from office, Bridges quietly left Hong Kong on 15 April 1861, and retired to private life. He died on 30 September 1894 in Bath.

Bridges Street in Sheung Wan is named after him. The law practice he founded in Hong Kong in 1851 continues to exist today, renamed Deacons.
