= Political history of Mysore and Coorg (1800–1947) =

An 1808 map of South India showing the princely state of Mysore and the neighboring region of Coorg.

The political history of Mysore and Coorg (1800–1947) is the political history of the contiguous historical regions of Mysore state and Coorg province located on the Deccan Plateau in west-central peninsular India, beginning with the acceptance of British suzerainty in 1800 to the independence of India in 1947.

== Purnea's administration ==
In the amāni lands (i.e. government-managed lands) the tax on cultivation in dry regions was a fixed money amount paid annually at approximately one-third of the crop value; for a given area, the crop value, was estimated and fixed for several years at a time. In "wet" or rice-growing regions, however, which on average provided more abundant yields, but which also depended more on the vagaries of the monsoon rains, the crop value was estimated annually, as soon as an estimate could be made. The latter tax was computed at one-half of the crop value and was paid "nominally in kind," but commonly in money.

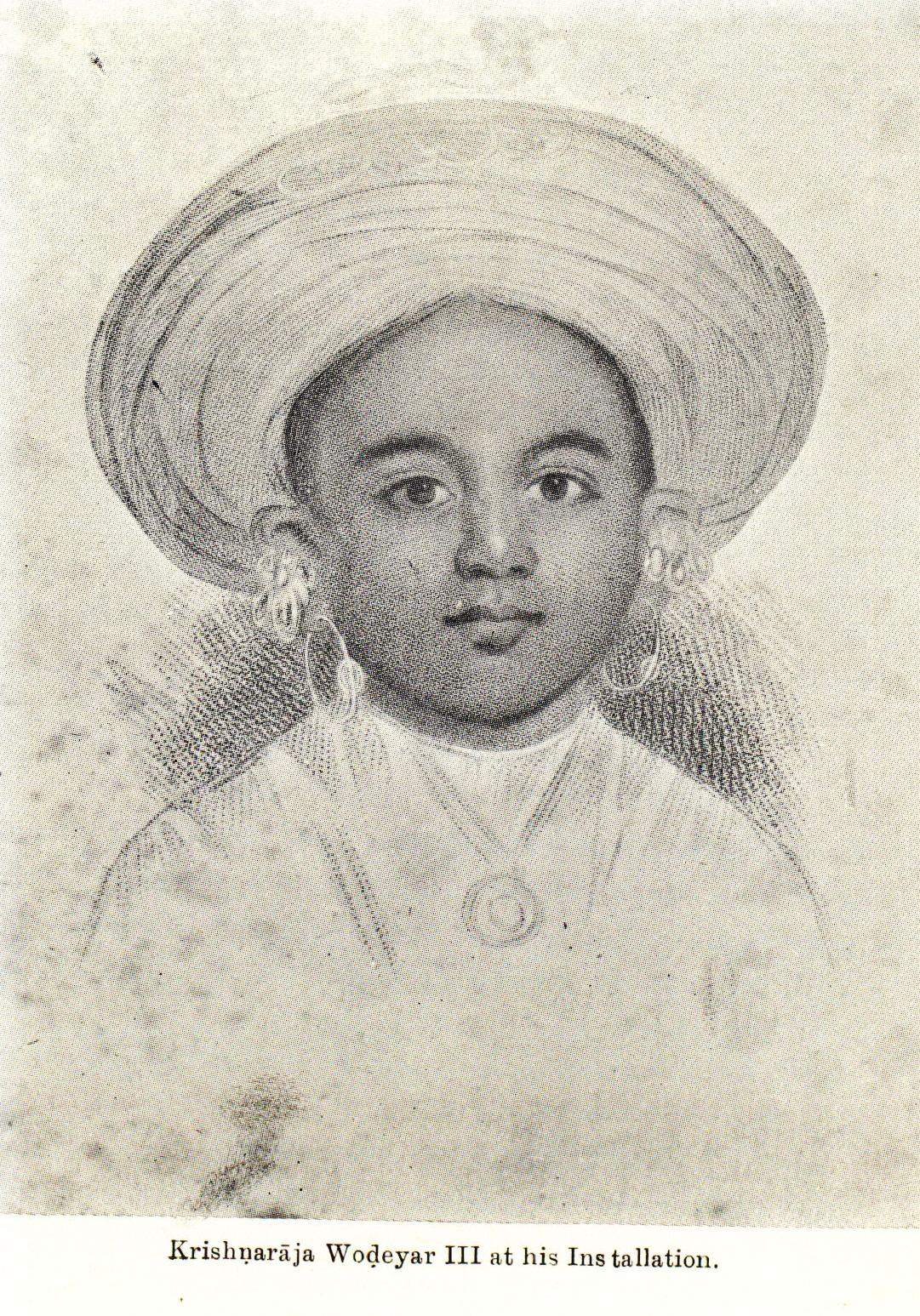
Krishna Raja Wadiar III at the time of his installation in 1799

Purniya, the Chief Minister and Regent of Mysore, ca. 1801.

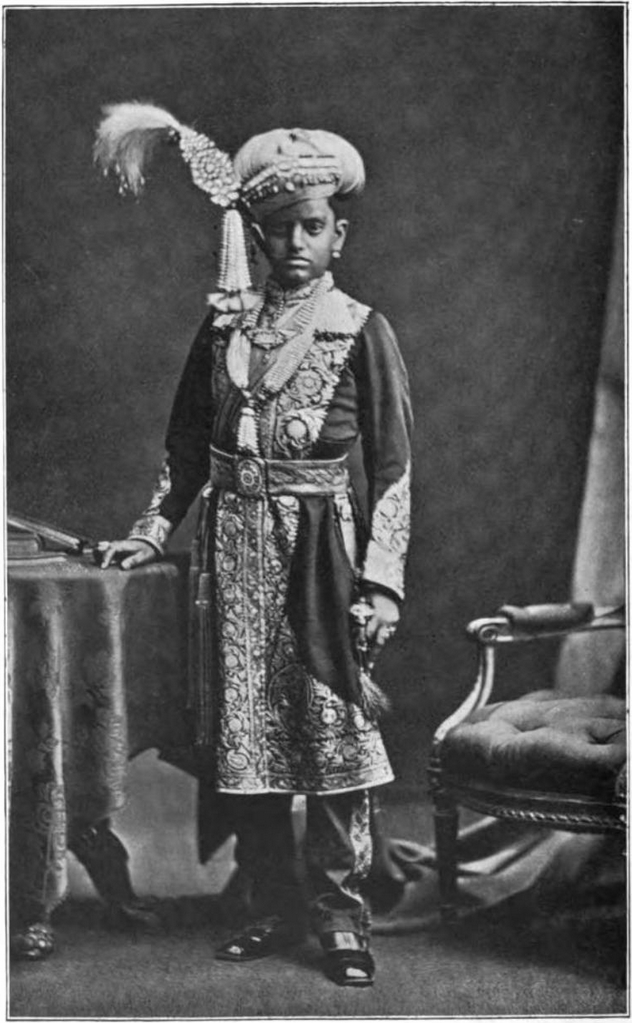
Chama Rajendra Wadiar, aged 15, in 1878.

== Sources and historiography ==
There is very little contemporaneous documentation of the pre-1760 period of Mysore's history, especially the last century of that period. According to Subrahmanyam 1989, p. 206, the 18th-century Wodeyar rulers of Mysore—in contrast to their contemporaries in Rajputana, Central India, Maratha Deccan, and Tanjavur—left little or no record of their administrations.

A Wodeyar dynasty genealogy, the Maisüru Mahardjara Vamsävali of Tirumalarya, was composed in Kannada during the period 1710–1715, and was claimed to be based on all the then-extant inscriptions in the region. Another genealogy, Kalale Doregala Vamgdvati, of the Delvoys, the near-hereditary chief ministers of Mysore, was composed around the turn of the 19th century. However, neither manuscript provides information about administration, economy or military capability. The ruling dynasty's origins, especially as expounded in later palace genealogies, are also of doubtful accuracy; this is, in part, because the Wodeyars, who were reinstated by the British on the Mysore gaddi in 1799, to preside over a fragile sovereignty, "obsessively" attempted to demonstrate their "unbroken" royal lineage, to bolster their then uncertain status.

The earliest manuscript offering clues to governance and military conflict in the pre-1760 Mysore, seems to be (Dias 1725), an annual letter written in Portuguese by a Mysore-based Jesuit missionary, Joachim Dias, and addressed to his Provincial superior. After East India Company's final 1799 victory over Tipu, official Company records began to be published as well; these include (East India Company 1800), a collection of Anglo-Mysore Wars-related correspondence between the Company's officials in India and Court of Directors in London, and (Wilks 1805), the first report on the new Princely State of Mysore by its first British resident, Mark Wilks. Around this time, French accounts of the Anglo-Mysore wars appeared as well, and included (Michaud 1809), a history of the wars by Joseph-François Michaud, another Jesuit priest. The first attempt at including a comprehensive history of Mysore in an English language work is (Buchanan 1807), an account of a survey of South India conducted at Lord Richard Wellesley's request, by Francis Buchanan, a Scottish physician and geographer.

The first explicit History of Mysore in English is (Wilks 1811), written by Mark Wilks, the British resident mentioned above. Wilks claimed to have based his history on various Kannada documents, not only the ones mentioned above, but also many that have not survived. According to (Subrahmanyam 1989, p. 206), all subsequent classic histories of Mysore have borrowed heavily from Wilks's book for their pre-1760 content. These include, (Rice 1897), Lewis Rice's well-known Gazetteer and (Rao 1948), C. Hayavadana Rao's major revision of the Gazetteer half a century later, and many spin-offs of these two works. By the end of the period of British Commissionership of Mysore (1831–1881), many English language works had begun to appear on a variety of Mysore-related subjects. These included (Rice 1879), a book of English translations of Kannada language inscriptions, and (Digby 1878), William Digby's two volume critique of British famine policy during the Great Famine of 1876–78, which devastated Mysore for years to come; the latter work, even referred to Mysore as a "province."

== See also ==
- Princely state
- Political history of Mysore and Coorg (1565–1760)
- Political history of Mysore and Coorg (1761–1799)
