= Political history of Mysore and Coorg (1565–1760) =

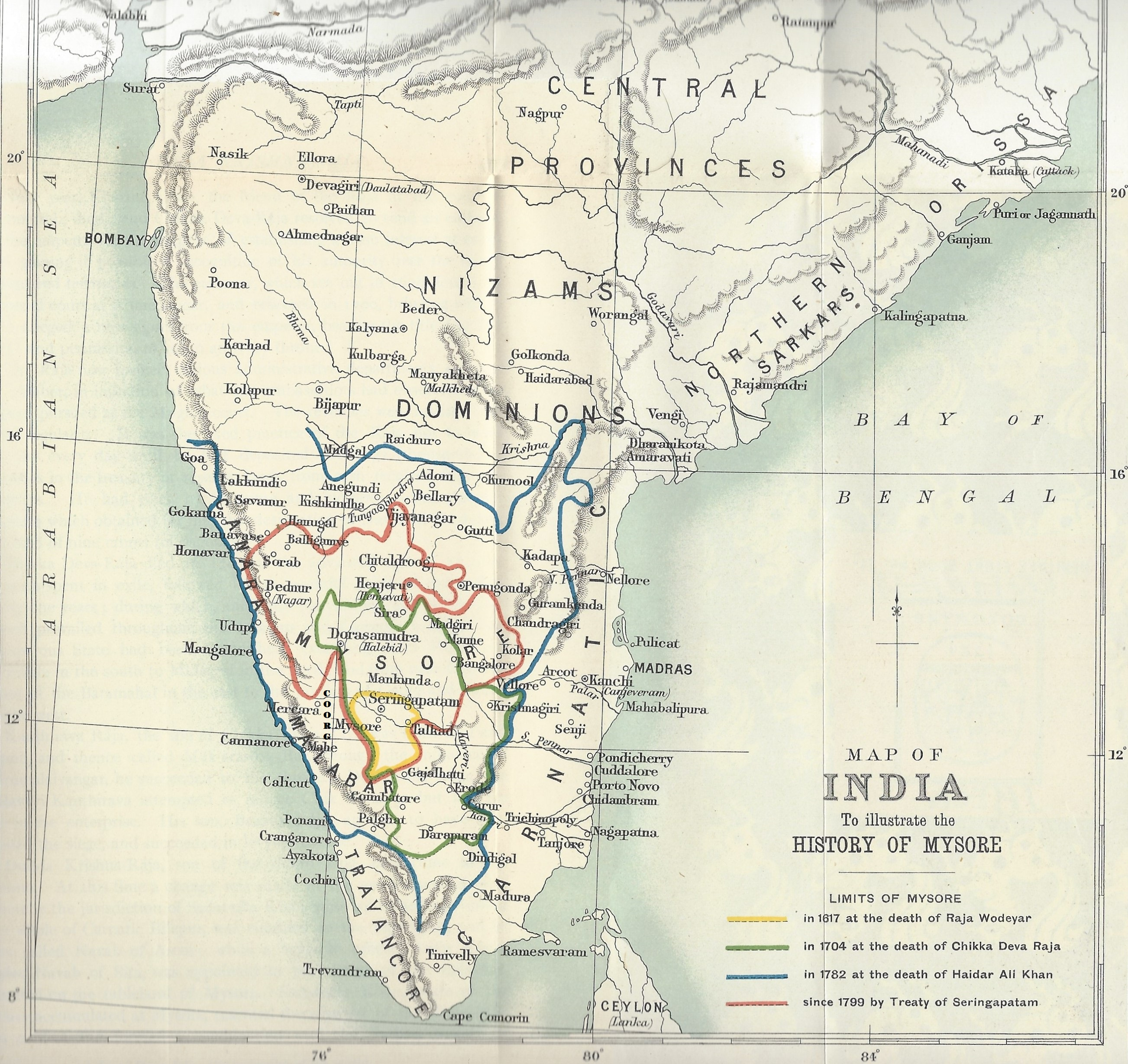
Map 1: Mysore and Coorg in a map of peninsular India showing shifting boundaries

The political history of the region on the Deccan Plateau in west-central peninsular India (Map 1) that was later divided into Mysore state and Coorg province saw many changes after the fall of the Hindu Vijayanagara Empire in 1565. The rise of Sultan Haidar Ali in 1761 introduced a new period.

At the height of the Vijayanagara Empire, the Mysore and Coorg region was ruled by diverse chieftains, or rajas ("little kings"). Each raja had the right to govern a small region, but also an obligation to supply soldiers and annual tribute for the empire's needs. After the empire's fall and the subsequent eastward move of the diminished ruling family, many chieftains tried to loosen their imperial bonds and expand their realms. Sensing opportunity amidst the new uncertainty, various powers from the north invaded the region. Among these were the Sultanate of Bijapur to the northwest, the Sultanate of Golconda to the northeast, the newly-formed Maratha Empire farther northwest, and the major contemporary empire of India, the Mughal, which bounded all on the north. For much of the 17th century the tussles between the little kings and the big powers, and amongst the little kings, culminated in shifting sovereignties, loyalties, and borders. By the turn of the 18th century, the political landscape had become better defined: the northwestern hills were being ruled by the Nayaka rulers of Ikkeri, the southwestern—in the Western Ghats—by the Rajas of Coorg, the southern plains by the Wodeyar rulers of Mysore, all of which were Hindu dynasties; and the eastern and northeastern regions by the Muslim Nawabs of Arcot and Sira. Of these, Ikkeri and Coorg were independent, Mysore, although much-expanded, was formally a Mughal dependency, and Arcot and Sira, Mughal subahs (or provinces).

Mysore's expansions had been based on unstable alliances. When the alliances began to unravel, as they did during the next half-century, decay set in, presided over by politically and militarily inept kings. The Mughal governor, Nawab of Arcot, in a display of the still remaining reach of a declining Mughal Empire, raided the Mysore capital, Seringapatam, to collect unpaid taxes. The Raja of Coorg began a war of attrition over territory in Mysore's western bordering regions. The Maratha Empire invaded and exacted concessions of land. In the chaotic last decade of this period, a little-known Muslim cavalryman, Haidar Ali, seized power in Mysore. Under him, and in the decades following, Mysore was to expand again. It was to match all of southern India in size, and to pose the last serious threat to the new rising power on the subcontinent, the English East India Company.

A common feature of all large regimes in the region during the period 1565–1760 is increased military fiscalism. This mode of creating income for the state consisted of extraction of tribute payments from local chiefs under threat of military action. It differed both from the more segmentary modes of preceding regimes and the more absolutist modes of succeeding ones—the latter achieved through direct tax collection from citizens. Another common feature of these regimes is the fragmentary historiography devoted to them, making broad generalizations difficult.

== Poligars of Vijayanagara, 1565–1635 ==
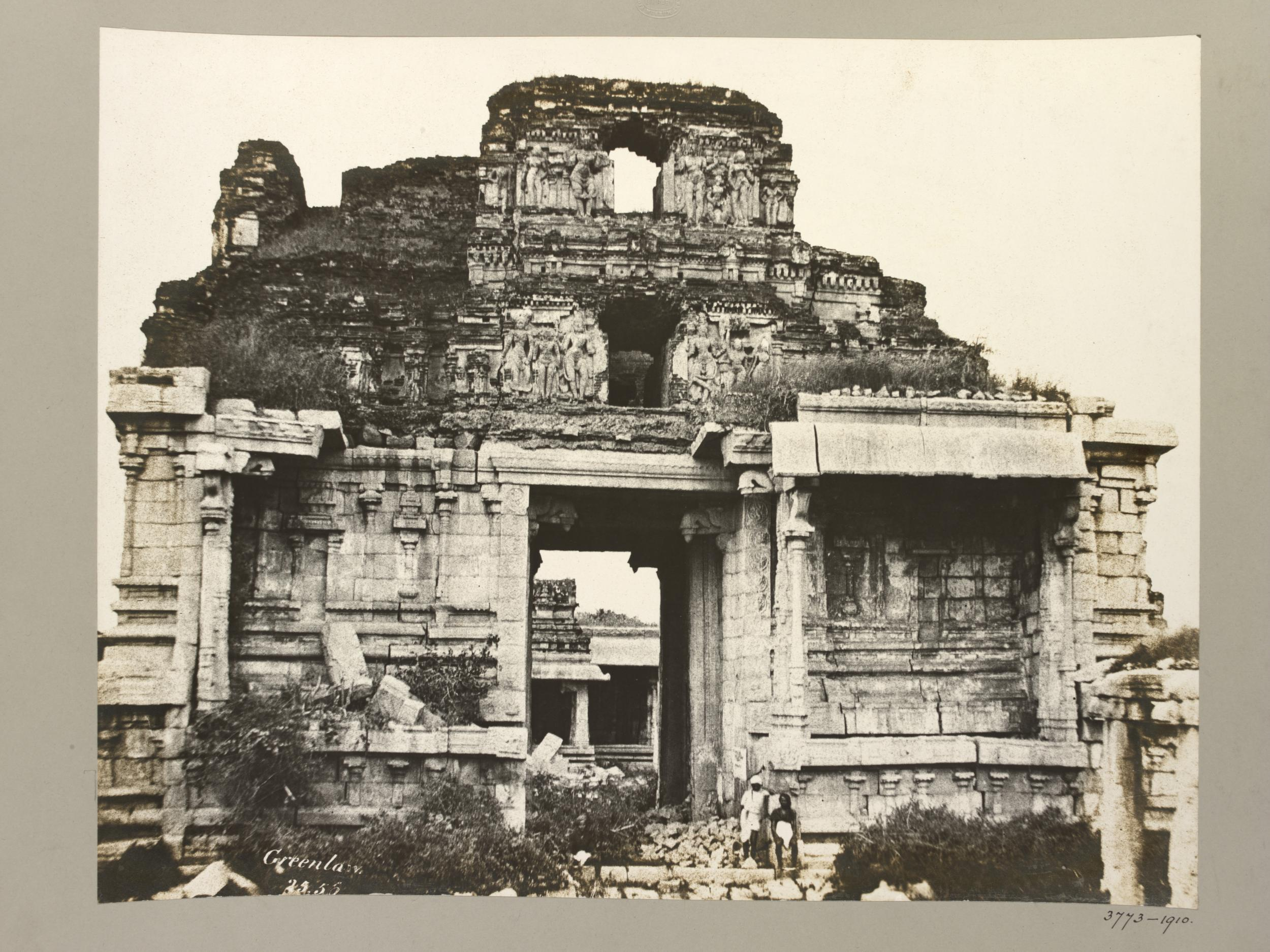
An 1856 photograph by John Alexander Greenlaw (1818–1870) of entrance to the Krishna temple at Hampi, among the ruins of the Vijayanagara Empire, now a UNESCO World Heritage Site. (Note: The austere, grandiose site of Hampi was the last capital of the last great Hindu Kingdom of Vijayanagar. Its fabulously rich princes built Dravidian temples and palaces which won the admiration of travellers between the 14th and 16th centuries. Conquered by the Deccan Muslim confederacy in 1565, the city was pillaged over a period of six months before being abandoned." From the brief description, UNESCO World Heritage List; India, Group of Monuments at Hampi.)

On 23 January 1565 the last Hindu empire in South India, the Vijayanagara Empire, was defeated by the combined forces of the Muslim states of Bijapur, Golconda, and Ahmadnagar in the Battle of Talikota. (Note: Krishnappa is said to have sent his able minister and chief agent of his consolidation of power in Madurai, Ariyanatha Mudaliar, with a large force to join Rama Raja as he marched northward to meet the assembled Muslim force on the Krishna River, eighty miles north of Vijayanagara. There, on the south bank of the river, in late January 1565, the Vijayanagara armies were at last decisively defeated, Rama Raja and many of his kinsmen and dependants were killed and the city opened to sacking by a combination of Golkonda soldiers and poligars from nearer to Vijayanagara. Rama Raja's warrior brother Tirumala survived the battle and brought the remnants of the once great army to Vijayanagara. Soon after, at the approach of the celebrating Golkonda army, he sought a place of greater security. This may have been Penukonda, a longtime royal stronghold, 120 miles and eight days' journey south-east of Vijayanagara; others believe that Tirumala took refuge behind the high walls of Venkatesvara's temple at Tirupati, still further away. The Muslim confederates immediately retrieved most of the territory that had been seized by Rama Raja during the previous twenty years, but certain places remained in Hindu hands for a longer time: Adoni was held until 1568 and Dharwar and Bankapur until 1573. After looting and a brief occupation, Vijayanagara was left to a future of neglect which has only been lifted recently by archaeologists and art historians working at Hampi.) The battle was fought on the doab (interfluve, or tongue of land) between the Kistna River and its major left bank tributary, the Bhima, 100 miles (160 km) to the north of the imperial capital, Vijayanagara (Map 2). The invaders from the north later destroyed the capital, and the ruler's family escaped to Penukonda, 125 miles (201 km) to the southeast, where they established their new capital. (Note: Less than a year later, the sultanate confederates fell out. Bijapur attacked Ahmadnagar and Golkonda joined forces with the latter. Some contemporary accounts even relate how Tirumala was approached to become a co-belligerent against Bijapur in the resurgent struggles! This last scheme did not materialise, leaving Tirumala free to commence his rule of the kingdom, nominally as regent, for Sadasivaraya was still alive and remained so until perhaps 1575. Vijayanagara appears to have been reoccupied by Tirumala for a time after his victors departed, but his efforts to repopulate the city were frustrated by attacks upon it by Bijapur soldiers who might have been invited there by Peda Tirumala, Rama Raja's son, who opposed his uncle's seizure of the regency. Tirumala may also have decided to leave Vijayanagara because of the support that Peda Tirumala, his nephew, enjoyed there. In any case, he moved back to Penukonda where the court was to be.) Later, they moved another 175 miles (282 km) east-southeast to Chandragiri, not far from the coast, and survived there until 1635, their dwindling empire concentrating its resources on its eastern Tamil and Telugu speaking realms. According to historian Sanjay Subrahmanyam: " ... in the ten years following 1565, the imperial centre of Vijayanagara effectively ceased to be a power as far as the western reaches of the peninsula were concerned, leaving a vacuum that was eventually filled by Ikkeri and Mysore."

In the heyday of their rule, the kings of Vijayanagara had granted tracts of land in their realm to vassal chiefs on the stipulation of an annual tribute and of military service during times of war. The chiefs in the richer, more distant, southern provinces were not controlled easily, and only a fraction of the tribute was collected from them. Overseen by a viceroy—titled Sri Ranga Raya and based in the island town of Seringapatam on the river Kaveri, 200 miles (320 km) south of the capital, (Note: Located on an island in the Kaveri, the great sacred south Indian river, the fortress of Srirangapattana became the capital of the Hindu Wodeyar dynasty of Mysore in 1610. A foundation myth tells of a miraculous milch cow from whom milk flowed spontaneously into a pit and how the god Ranganatha appeared to the Kartar, or Raja, in a dream, instructing him to build a temple in his honour on the site (1). Another story, in the Sthalapurana, relates how the god came to reside on the island at the request of the river goddess. The myths reflect the auspicious nature of the location, whose situation made a potent source of sacred power, the power to which aspiring rulers sought access over the centuries. It is little wonder, then, that Seringapatam, as it is more familiarly known, remained Mysore's capital, through fluctuating fortunes, until its final conquest by the British in 1799. In more mundane terms, the establishment of Wodeyar power had been facilitated by the decline of the empire of Vijayanagara, whose suzerainty Mysore continued to acknowledge for another fifty-eight years. Successors in the region to the hegemony of the Colas and the Hoysalas, the rulers of this great Hindu dynasty, held sway in the south for over two hundred years.) the southern chiefs bore various titles. These included the Nayaka, assumed by the chiefs of Keladi in the northwestern hills, Basavapatna, and Chitaldroog in the north, Belur in the west, and Hegalvadi in the centre; the title Gowda, assumed by the chiefs of Ballapur and Yelahanka in the centre, and Sugatur (Kolar district) in the east; and Wodeyar, assumed by the rulers of Mysore in the south. (Map 2.)

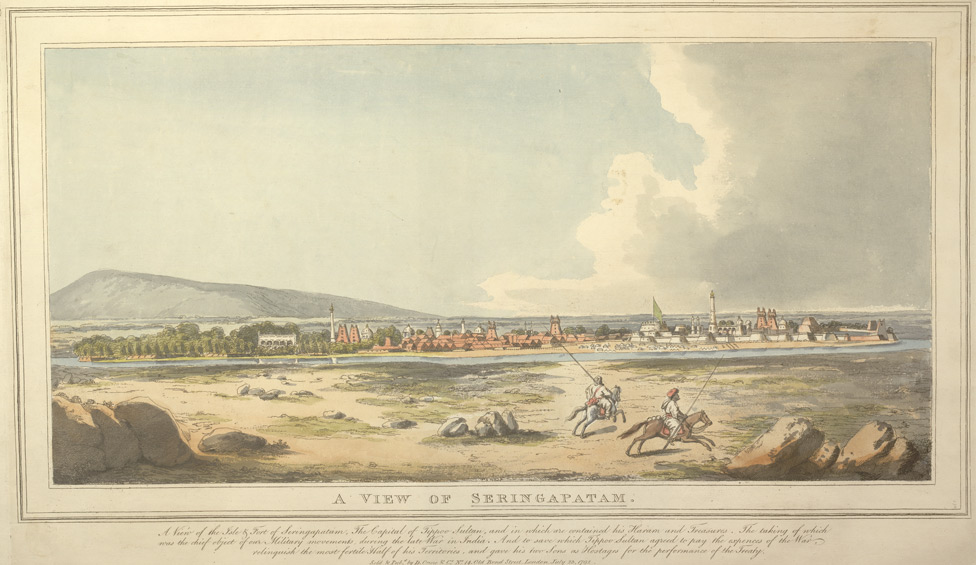
An early 19th-century watercolour of the island town of Seringapatam on the Kaveri River.

The southern chiefs (sometimes called rajas, or "little kings") resisted on moral and political grounds as well. According to historian Burton Stein:

'Little kings', or rajas, never attained the legal independence of an aristocracy from both monarchs and the local people whom they ruled. The sovereign claims of would-be centralizing, South Indian rulers and the resources demanded in the name of that sovereignty diminished the resources which local chieftains used as a kind of royal largess; thus centralizing demands were opposed on moral as well as on political grounds by even quite modest chiefs.

These chiefs came to be called poligars, a British corruption of "Palaiyakkarar," Tamil: holder of "palaiya" or "baronial estate;" Kannada: palagararu.

In 1577, more than a decade after the Battle of Talikota, Bijapur forces attacked again and overwhelmed all opposition along the western coast. They easily took Adoni, a former Vijayanagara stronghold, and subsequently attempted to take Penukonda, the new Vijayanagara capital. (Map 3).) They were, however, repulsed by an army led by the Vijayanagara ruler's father-in-law, Jagadeva Raya, who had travelled north for the engagement from his base in Baramahal. For his services, his territories within the crumbling empire were expanded out to the Western Ghats, the mountain range running along the southwestern coast of India; a new capital was established in Channapatna (Map 6.)

Soon the Wodeyars of Mysore (present-day Mysore district) began to more openly disregard the Vijayanagara monarch, annexing small states in their vicinity. (Map 3) The chiefs of Ummattur attempted to do the same despite punitive raids by the Vijayanagara armies. Eventually, as a compromise, the son of an Ummattur chief was appointed the viceroy at Seringapatam. In 1644, Mysore Wodeyars unseated the powerful Changalvas of Piriyapatna, becoming the dominant presence in the southern regions. (Map 6.) By this time the Vijayanagara empire was on its last legs.

Map 2: South India in 1525

Map 3: South India at the turn of the 17th century

Map 4: Bijapur-Maratha provinces in South India

== Bijapur, Marathas, Mughals, 1636–1687 ==
In 1636, nearly 60 years after their defeat at Penukonda, the Sultans of Bijapur regrouped and invaded the kingdoms to their south. They did so with the blessing of the Mughal Empire of northern India whose tributary states they had newly become. They had the help also of a chieftain of the Maratha uplands of western India, Shahaji Bhonsle, who was on the lookout for rewards of jagir land in the conquered territories the taxes on which he could collect as an annuity.

Watercolour of the temple at Kolar, 1800. Kolar district was in the Carnatic-Bijapur-Payanghat province in the mid-17th century.

In the western-central poligar regions, the Nayakas of Keladi were easily defeated, but were able to buy back their lands from their Bijapur invaders. (Map 4.) Eastward, the Bijapur-Shahji forces took the gold-rich Kolar district in 1639, and Bangalore—a city founded a century earlier by Kempe Gowda I. Advancing down the Eastern Ghats, the mountains rising behind the coastal plains of southeastern India, they captured the historic towns of Vellore and Gingee. Returning north through the east-central maidan plain (average elevation 600 m (2,000 ft)), they gained possession of the towns of Ballapur, Sira, and the hill fortress of Chitaldroog. (See Map 4.)

A new province, Caranatic-Bijapur-Balaghat, incorporating Kolar, Hoskote, Bangalore, and Sira, and situated above (or westwards of) the Eastern Ghats range, was added to the Sultanate of Bijapur and granted to Shahji as a jagir. The possessions below the Ghats, such as Gingee and Vellore became part of another province, Carnatic-Bijapur-Payanghat, and Shahji was appointed its first governor.

When Shahji died in 1664, his son Venkoji from his second wife, who had become the ruler of Tanjore much farther down the peninsula, inherited these territories. This did not sit well with Shahji's eldest son, from his first wife, Shivaji Bhonsle—a chieftain back in the Maratha uplands—who swiftly led an expedition southwards to claim his share. His quick victories resulted in a partition, whereby both the Carnatic-Bijapur provinces became his jagirs, and Tanjore was retained by Venkoji. (See Map 4.)

The successes of Bijapur and Shivaji were being watched with some alarm by their suzrain, the Mughals. Emperor Aurengzeb, who had usurped the Mughal throne in 1659, soon set himself upon destroying the remaining Deccan sultanates. In 1686, the Mughals took Bijapur and, the following year, Golconda, capturing the latter's diamond mines. Before long, fast-moving Mughal armies were bearing down on all the former Vijayanagara lands. Bangalore, quickly taken by the Mughals from the Marathas, was sold to the Wodeyar of Mysore for 300,000 rupees. In 1687, a new Mughal province (or suba), Province of Sira, was created with capital at Sira city. Qasim Khan was appointed the first Mughal Faujdar Diwan (literally, "military governor").

== Wodeyars of Mysore, 1610–1760 ==
Although their own histories date the origins of the Wodeyars of Mysore (also "Odeyar", "Udaiyar", "Wodiyar", "Wadiyar", or "Wadiar", and, literally, "chief") to 1399, records of them go back no earlier than the early 16th century. These poligars are first mentioned in a Kannada language literary work from the early 16th century. A petty chieftain, Chamaraja (now Chamaraja III), who ruled from 1513 to 1553 over a few villages not far from the Kaveri River, is said to have constructed a small fort and named it, Mahisuranagara ("Buffalo Town"), from which Mysore gets its name. (Map 5.) The Wodeyar clan issued its first inscription during the chieftaincy of Timmaraja (now Timmaraja II) who ruled from 1553 to 1572. Towards the end of his rule, he is recorded to have owned 33 villages and fielded an army of 300 men.

By the time of the short-lived incumbency of Timmaraja II's son, Chama Raja IV—who, well into his 60s, ruled from 1572 to 1576—the Vijayanagara Empire had been dealt its fatal blow. Before long, Chama Raja IV withheld payment of the annual tribute to the empire's viceroy at Seringapatam. The viceroy responded by attempting to arrest Chamaraja IV, failing, and letting the taxes remain unpaid. An outright military challenge to the empire would have to await the incumbency of Raja I, Chama Raja IV's eldest son, who became the Wodeyar in 1578. Raja I captured Seringapatam and, in a matter of days, moved his capital there on 8 February 1610. (Map 5.) During his rule, according to Burton Stein, his "chiefdom expanded into a major principality".

In 1638, the reins of power fell into the hands of the 23-year-old Kanthirava Narasaraja I, who had been adopted a few months earlier by the widow of Raja I. Kanthirava was the first wodeyar of Mysore to create the symbols of royalty such as a royal mint, and coins named Kanthiraya (corrupted to "Canteroy") after himself. These remained a part of Mysore's "current national money" well into the 18th century.

Catholic missionaries, who had arrived in the coastal areas of southern India—the southwestern Malabar coast, the western Kanara coast, and the southeastern Coromandel coast (also "Carnatic")—early in the 16th century, were not active in land-locked Mysore until halfway through the 17th. (Map 5). The Mysore mission was established in Seringapatam in 1649 by Leonardo Cinnami, an Italian Jesuit from Goa. Expelled a few years later from Mysore on account of opposition in Kanthirava's court, Cinnami returned, toward the end of Kanthirava's rule, to establish missions in half a dozen locations. During his second stay Cinnami obtained permission to convert Kanthirava's subjects to Christianity. He was successful mostly in the regions which were to become a part of the Madras Presidency of British India. According to (Subrahmanyam 1989), "Of a reported 1700 converts in the Mysore mission in the mid-1660s, a mere quarter were Kannadigas (Kannada language speakers), the rest being Tamil speakers from the western districts of modern-day Tamil Nadu, ..."

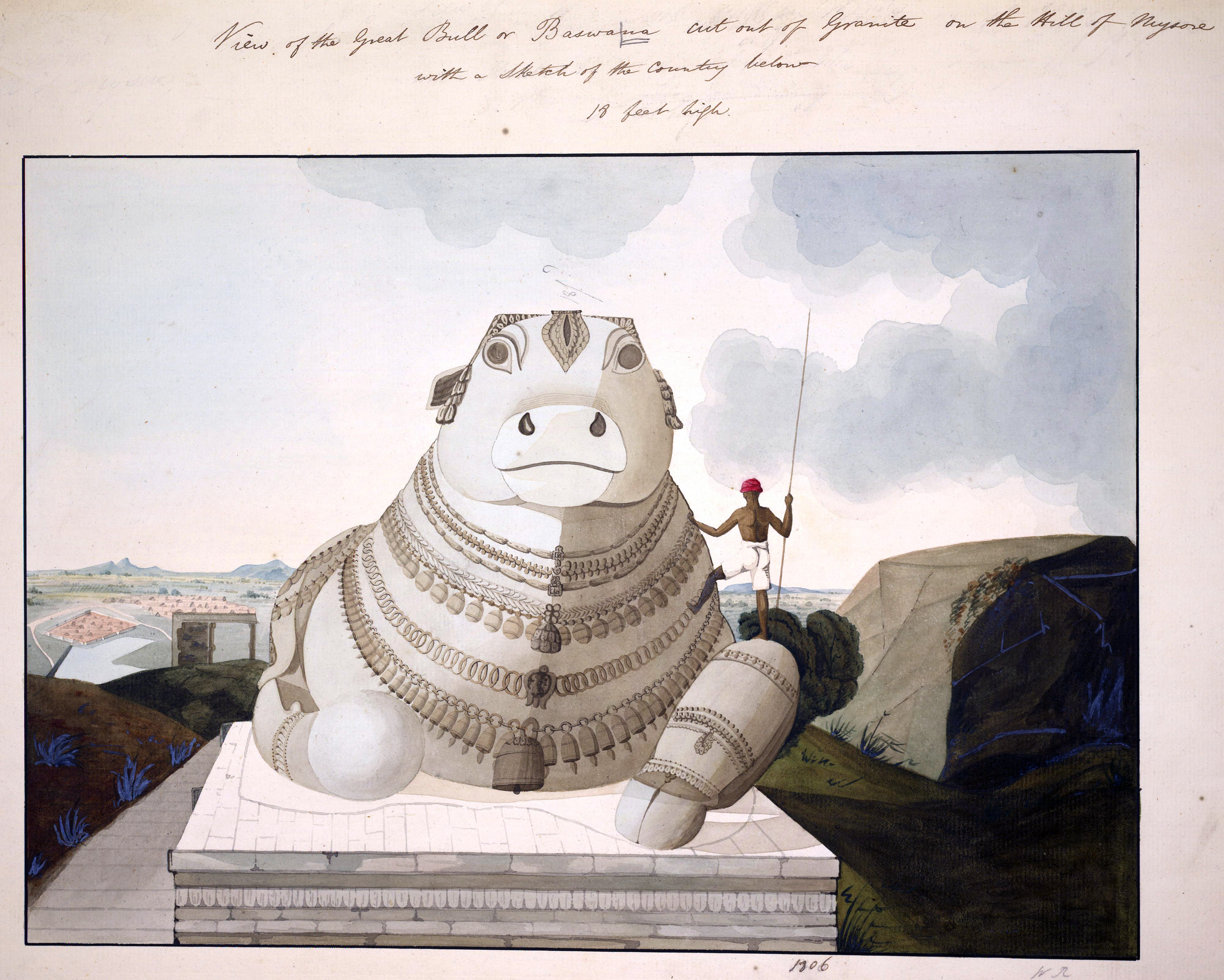
Company style watercolour, 1806, of the colossal monolithic granite Nandi bull of 1659 on the road to Chamundi Hill overlooking Mysore

After an unremarkable period of rule by short-lived incumbents, Kanthirava's 27-year-old great nephew, Chikka Devaraja, became the new wodeyar in 1672. During his rule, centralized military power increased to an unprecedented degree for the region. (Map 5 and Map 7.) Although he introduced various mandatory taxes on peasant-owned land, Chikka Devaraja exempted his soldiers' land from these payments. The apprehended inequity of this action, the unusually high taxes, and the intrusive nature of his regime, created widespread protests which had the support of the wandering Jangama ascetics in the monasteries of the Lingayats, a monotheistic religious order that emphasizes a personal relationship with the Hindu god Shiva. According to D. R. Nagaraja a slogan of the protests was:

Basavanna (Note: Basava was the founder of a 12th-century reform movement in Hinduism, which brought the Virasaivas into prominence.) the Bull tills the forest land; Devendra (Note: Devendra, or Indra, is the Vedic Hindu god of war, thunder, and rain.) gives the rains;
Why should we, the ones who grow crops through hard labour, pay taxes to the king?

The king used the stratagem of inviting over 400 monks to a grand feast at the famous Shaiva centre of Nanjanagudu. Upon its conclusion, he presented them with gifts and directed them to exit one at a time through a narrow lane where they were strangled by royal wrestlers who had been awaiting them.

Around 1687 Chikka Devaraja purchased the city of Bangalore for Rs. 300,000 from Qasim Khan, the new Mughal governor of the Province of Sira. Continual strife with the Marathas led to an alliance with the Mughal emperor Aurengzeb (reigned 1658–1707), who elaborately praised the Mysore king for the pursuit of their mutual enemy. Lands below the Eastern Ghats around Baramahal and Salem, less the objects of Mughal interest, were annexed to Mysore, as were those below the Baba Budan mountains (Note: This mountain range is named after the shrine of Baba Budan, a 17th-century Sufi saint.) on the western edge of the Deccan Plateau. When the Raja died on 16 November 1704, his dominions extended from Midagesi in the north to Palni Hills and Anaimalai in the south, and from Coorg in the west to Dharmapuri district in the east. (Map 5 and Map 7.)

Map 5: Varying boundaries of Mysore from 1617 to 1799

Map 6: wodeyar Mysore and other petty kingdoms in the region c. 1625

Map 7: Mysore, c. 1704, during the reign of Chikka Devaraja

Late 19th-century photograph of the ivory throne in Mysore palace, the original version of which, it was said, was presented by Mughal Emperor Aurengzeb to Chikka Devaraja in 1704

According to Sanjay Subrahmanyam, the polity that Chikka Devaraja left for his son was "at one and the same time a strong and a weak" one. Although it had uniformly expanded in size from the mid-17th century to the early 18th century, it had done so as a result of alliances that tended to hinder the very stability of the expansions. Some of the southeastern conquests (such as that of Salem), although involving regions that were not of direct interest to the Mughals, were the result of alliances with the Mughal governor of Sira and with Venkoji, the Maratha ruler of Tanjore. The siege of Tiruchirapalli had to be abandoned because the alliance had begun to rupture. (Map 7.) Similarly, in addition to allegedly receiving a signet ring and a Royal State Sword or Sword of State from Aurangzeb in 1700, Chikka Devaraja accepted an unspoken subordination to Mughal authority and a requirement to pay annual taxes. There is evidence also that the administrative reforms Chikka Devaraja had instituted might have been a direct result of Mughal influence.

The early 18th century ushered in the rule of Kanthirava Narasaraja II, who being both hearing- and speech-impaired ruled under the regency of a series of army chiefs (Delavoys), all hailing from a single family from the village of Kalale in the Nanjangud taluk (or sub-district) of Mysore. Upon the ruler's death in 1714 at the age of 41, his son, Dodda Krishnaraja I, still two weeks shy of his 12th birthday, succeeded him. According to E. J. Rice, the ruler's lack of interest in the affairs of state, led two ministers, Devaraja, the army chief (or delavayi), and his cousin, Nanjaraja, who was both the revenue minister (the sarvadhikari) and the privy councilor (pradhana), to wield all authority in the kingdom. After Dodda Krishnaraja's death in 1736, the ministers appointed "pageant rajas", and effectively ruled Mysore until the rise of Haidar Ali in 1760.

== Nayakas of Ikkeri and Kanara trade, 1565–1763 ==
In the northwestern regions, according to Stein,

an even more impressive chiefly house arose in Vijayanagara times and came to enjoy an extensive sovereignty. These were the Keladi chiefs who later founded the Nayaka kingdom of Ikkeri. At its greatest, the Ikkeri rajas controlled a territory nearly as large as the Vijayanagara heartland, some 20,000 square miles, extending about 180 miles south from Goa along the trade-rich Kanara coast.

When Vasco da Gama landed in Calicut on the southwestern Malabar coast of India in 1498, the Vijayanagara Empire was about to reach its apex. The Portuguese pursued their pepper trade farther south on the Malabar coast. In the decade after the fall of the empire, they decided as a commercial strategy to hedge their bets and to commence purchasing pepper from the Kanara region. During 1568–1569, they took possession of the coastal towns of Onor (now Honavar), Barcelor (now Basrur), and Mangalore and constructed fortresses and factories at each location. (Map 1 and Map 8.)

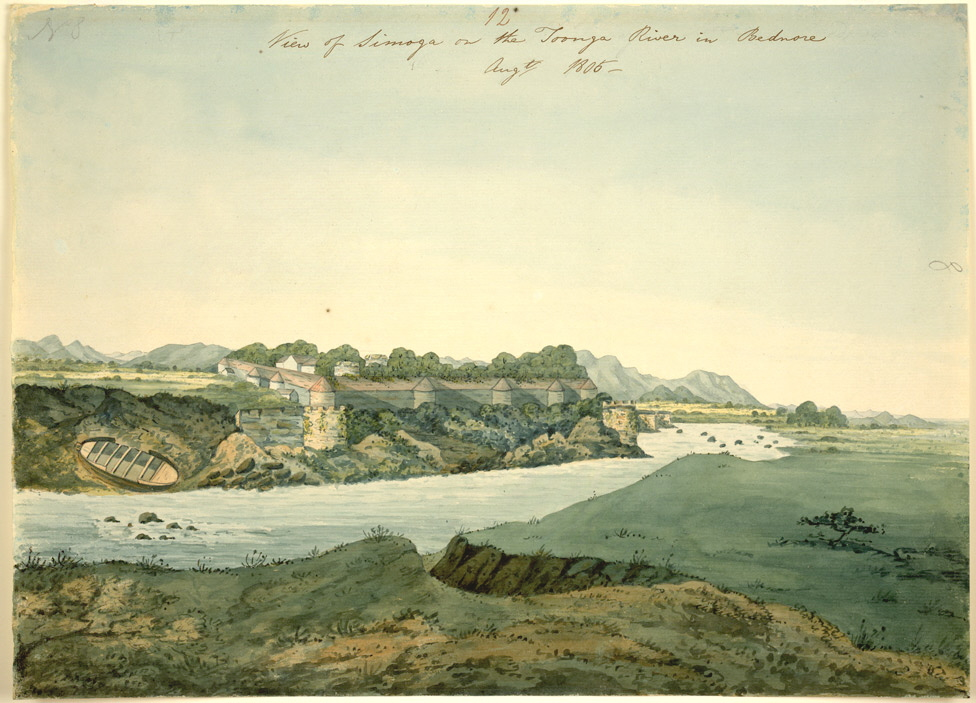
Watercolour of Shimoga, 1805. Shimoga was an important stronghold of the Keladi Nayakas in the 16th and 17th centuries.

Onor (Modern Honnavar) was located on the banks of the Sharavathi River, where the river widened into a lake, two miles (3 km) upstream from its mouth. Built strategically on a cliff, the Portuguese fort contained homes for thirty casados (married settlers). A natural sandbank kept out the large ocean-going ships, leaving the harbour accessible only to small craft. Approximately, 35 miles (56 km) farther upstream, the Portuguese maintained a weighing station at Gersoppa, where they purchased the pepper. During the latter part of the 16th century and the first half of the 17th, Onor not only became the principal port for the export of Kanara pepper, but also the most important Portuguese supply point for pepper in all of Asia.

Located some 50 miles (80 km) south of Onor, and a few miles up the Coondapoor estuary (now Varahi), was the town of Barcelore (now Basrur). Building their fortress downstream of the existing Hindu town in order to control any approaches from the sea, the Portuguese provided accommodation for 30 casados within its walls; another 35 casados and their families lived in a walled compound at a stone's throw. Barcelore became a busy trading centre which exported rice, local textiles, saltpetre, and iron from the interior regions and imported corals, exotic yard goods and horses.(Map 1 and Map 8.)

Fifty miles south of Barcelore was Mangalore, the last of the Portuguese strongholds in Kanara; it was situated on the mouth of the Netravati River. There too the Portuguese built a fortress and alongside it a walled town with accommodation for 35 casados families. Both Barcelore and Mangalore became principal ports for the export of rice, and during the first half of the 17th century supplied the other strategic fortalezas of significance to the Estado da India, the Portuguese Asian empire. These included, Goa, Malacca, Muscat, Mozambique and Mombasa. (Map 1.)

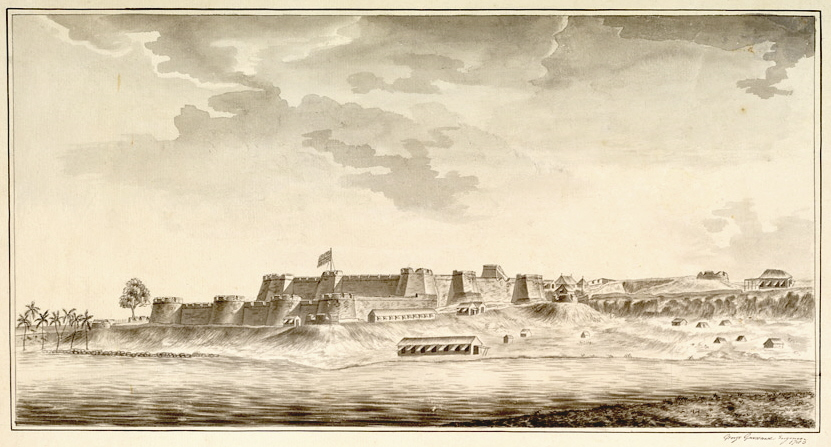
A pen and ink drawing of Mangalore Fort made in 1783 after it had been taken by the English East India Company

As a ready source of rice, pepper, and teak, the Kanara coast was important to the Estado. For much of the 16th century, Portuguese had been able to negotiate favourable terms of trade with the weak principalities that constituted the Kanara coast. Towards the end of the century, the Nayaka ruler of Keladi (and Ikkeri), Venkatappa Nayaka (r. 1592–1629), and his successors, Virabhadra Nayaka (r. 1629–1645) and Shivappa Nayaka (r. 1645–1660) forced a revision of the previous trade treaties. By the 1630s, the Portuguese had agreed to buy pepper at market rates and the rulers of Ikkeri had been permitted two voyages per year without the purchase of a cartaz (a pass for Portuguese protection) as well as annual importation of twelve duty-free horses. When the last king of Vijayanagara sought refuge in his realms, Shivappa Nayaka set him up at Belur and Sakkarepatna, and later mounted an unsuccessful siege of Seringapatam on the latter's behalf. By the 1650s, he had driven the Portuguese out of the three fortalezas at Onor, Barcelore, and Mangalore. After his death in 1660, his successor Somashker Nayaka, however, sent an embassy to Goa for reestablishing the Portuguese trading posts in Kanara. By 1671, a treaty had been agreed to which was very favorable once again to the Portuguese. (Map 8 and Map 9.)

Before the treaty could be implemented, though, Somashkar Nayaka died and was succeeded by an infant grandson Basava Nayaka, his succession disputed by the Queen Mother, who favoured another claimant, Timmaya Nayaka. The 1671 treaty languished amidst the succession struggle until 1678, when yet another treaty was negotiated with Basava Nayaka who had emerged as the victor. As both parties in the succession struggle had been interested in purchasing European artillery from the Portuguese, the eventual treaty of 1678 was even more favourable to the latter. Under it, Basava agreed to pay 30,000 xerafins in Portuguese war-charges for the decade-long conflict with the Dutch (whom the Nayakas of Ikkeri had supported), to provide construction material for the factory at Mangalore, to provide 1,500 sacks of clean rice annually, to pay a yearly tribute for Mangalore and Barcelore, to destroy the factories of the Omani Arabs on the Kanara coast, and to allow Catholic churches to be built at a number of locations in Kanara. With the treaty in place, Portuguese power returned to Kanara after an interregnum of almost half a century.

== Subahdars of Sira, 1689–1760 ==
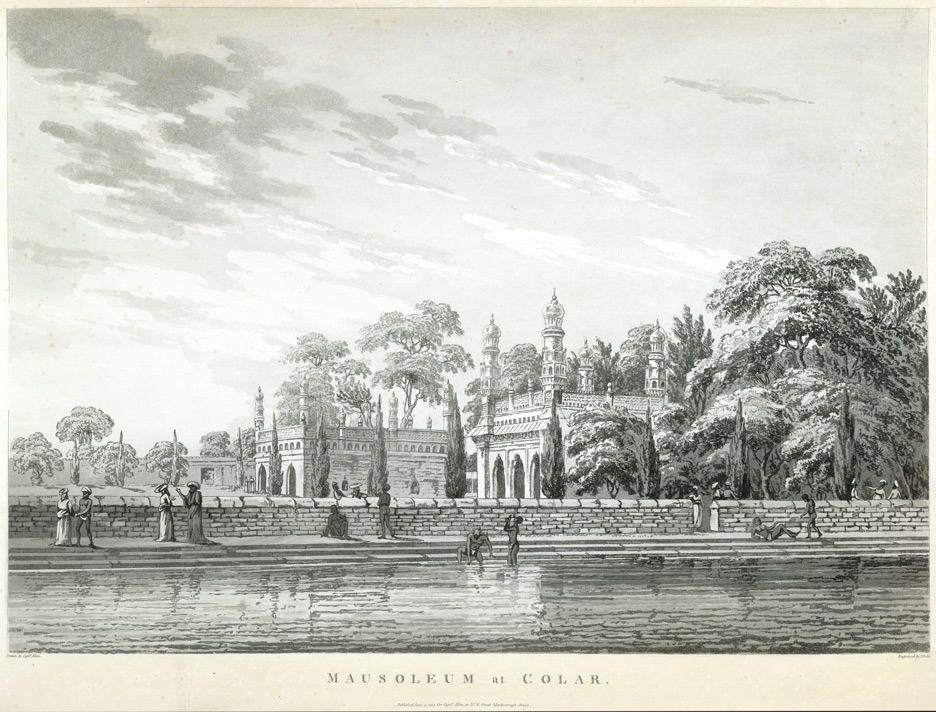
A 1794 aquatint of the mausoleum at Kolar, where Haidar Ali's father, Fateh Muhammad, the military governor (faujdar) of Kolar district in the province of Sira, is buried

A Mughal province which comprised the Carnatic region south of the Tungabhadra River, and which was to exist for seventy years, was established in 1687 with its capital at Sira (in Tumkur District). ( Map 10.) The Province of Sira (also Carnatic-Balaghat) was composed of seven parganas (districts): Basavapatna, Budihal, Sira, Penukonda, Dod-Ballapur, Hoskote, and Kolar; in addition, Harpanahalli, Kondarpi, Anegundi, Bednur, Chitaldroog, and Mysore were considered by the Mughals to be tributary states of the province. Qasim Khan (also, Khasim Khan or Kasim Khan) was appointed the first Subahdar (governor) and Faujdar (military governor) of the province in 1689. Having displayed "energy and success" both in controlling the province and in developing it, he died in 1694, killed either by Maratha raiders from the northwest, or killing himself in disgrace after these raiders seized a treasure under his care. Most Subhahdars who governed after him were replaced in a year or two by a successor. The instability continued until Dilavar Khan was appointed governor in 1726, his term lasting until 1756. In 1757, Sira was overrun by the Marathas, but was restored to the Mughals in 1759. In 1761 future ruler Haidar Ali, whose father had been the Mughal military governor (or Faujdar) of Kolar district in the province, captured Sira, and soon conferred on himself the title of "Nawab of Sira". However, the defection of his brother five years later caused the province to be lost again to the Marathas, who retained it until Haidar's son, Tipu Sultan, recaptured it for his father in 1774.

The capital of the province, Sira town, prospered most under Dilavar Khan and expanded in size to accommodate 50,000 homes. (Map 10.) Palaces and public monuments of Sira became models for other future constructions; both Haidar Ali's palace in Bangalore and Tipu Sultan's in Seringapatam, built during the period 1761–1799 of their rule, were modelled after Dilavar Khan's palace in Sira. Likewise, according to Rice, Bangalore's Lal Bagh as well as Bangalore fort may have been designed after Sira's Khan Bagh gardens and Sira fort. Sira's civil servants, though, could not be as readily reproduced. After Tipu Sultan had succeeded his father as Sultan of Mysore in 1782, he deported 12,000 families, mainly of city officials, from Sira to Shahr Ganjam, a new capital he founded on Seringapatam island.

Earlier, after the Moghul armies had overrun the Mysore table-land in 1689, twelve parganas (or sub-districts) were annexed to the newly formed province (subah) of Sira. The other regions were allowed to remain under the poligars, who continued to collect taxes from the cultivators, but were now required to pay annual tribute to the provincial government in Sira. In the annexed regions, an elaborate system of officials collected and managed revenue. Most offices had existed under the previous Bijapur Sultanate administration, and consisted of Deshmūks, Deshpāndes, Majmūndārs, and Kānungoyas. The Deshmūks "settled accounts" with the village headmen (or patels); the Deshpāndes verified the account-books of the village registrars (or kārnāms); the Kānungoyas entered the official regulations in the village record-books and also explained decrees and regulations to the village governing officers and residents. Lastly, the Majmūndārs prepared the final documents of the "settlement" (i.e. the assessment and payment of tax (Note: "In India: The process of assessing the government land-tax over a specific area.")) and promulgated it.

Map 8: A 1692 map of South India showing Onor (Honavar), Barcelor (Basrur), and Mangalore on the western Kanara coast just below Goa

Map 9: An 1897 map of Shimoga district showing Ikkeri and Keladi in Sagar taluq on the west (in orange)

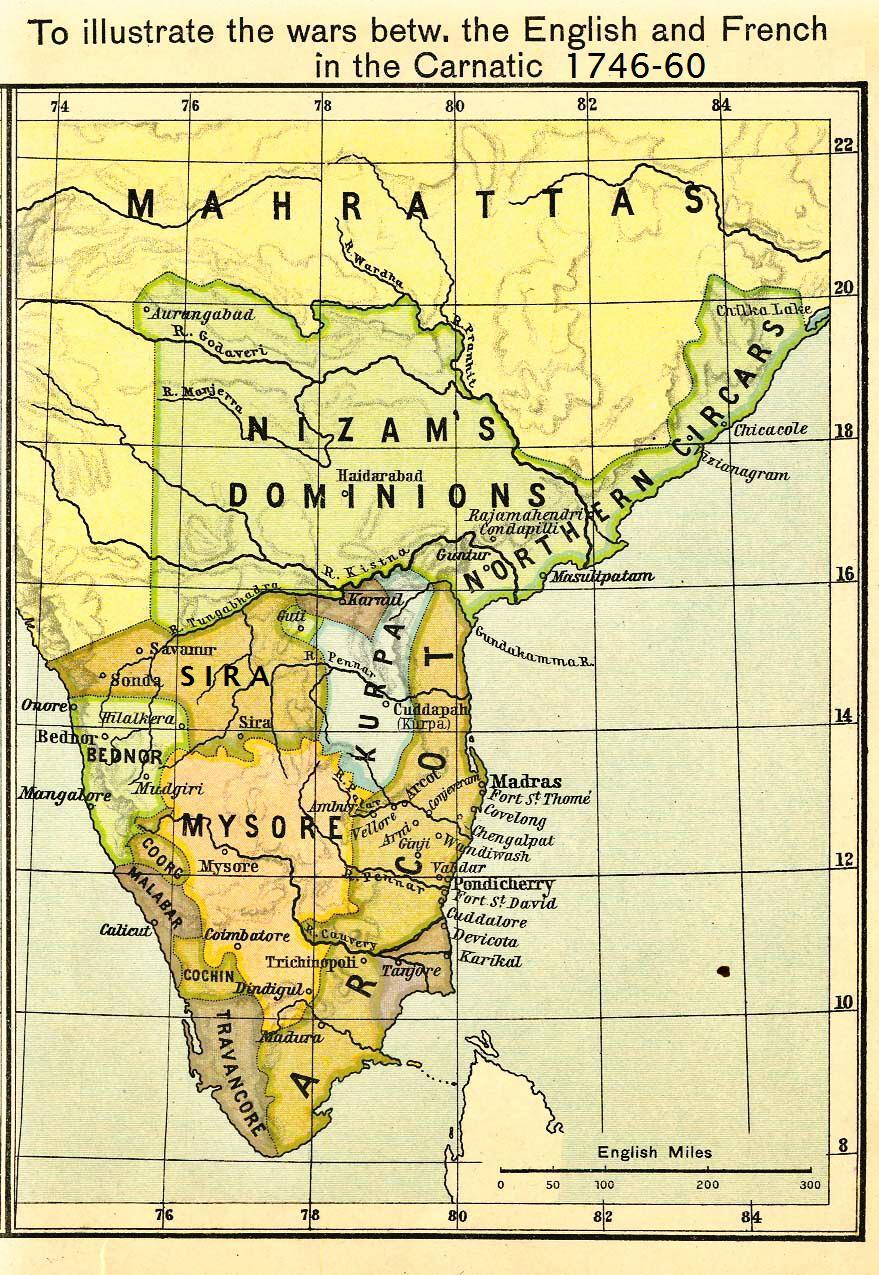
Map 10: The Mughal province of Sira shown in a map of South India at the time of the Anglo-French Wars in the Carnatic, 1746–1760.

Map 11: Map of Coorg province c. 1897

Until the mid-17th century, both village- and district (taluq) accounts had been prepared in the language and script of Kannada, the region's traditional language. However, after the Bijapur invasions, Maratha chieftains came to wield authority in the region and brought in various officials who introduced the Marathi language and script into the "public accounts". The new language even found its way into lands ruled by some poligar chiefs. After the province of Sira was created, Persian, the official language of the Moghul empire, came to be used.

== Rajas of Coorg, mid-16th century – 1768 ==
Although, Rājendranāme, a "royal" genealogy of the rulers of Coorg written in 1808, makes no mention of the origin of the lineage, its reading by historian Lewis Rice led him to conclude that the princely line was established by a member of the Ikkeri Nayaka family. Having moved south to the town of Haleri in northern Coorg in the disguise of a wandering Jangama monk, he began to attract followers. With their help, or acquiescence, he took possession of the town, and in such manner eventually came to rule the country. (Map 11.) According to the genealogy, the Coorg rajas who ruled from the mid-16th century to the mid-18th century were:

Rulers of Coorg from mid-16th century to mid-18th century
Ruler	Period of rule
Vira Raja	Not known
Appaji Raja	Not known
Mudu Raja	1633–1687
Dodda Virappa	1687–1738
Chikka Virappa	1738–1768

By the late 17th century, the rajas of Coorg had created an "aggressive and independent" state. Muddu Raja, the Coorg ruler from 1633 to 1687, moved his capital to Mercara, fortifying it and building a palace there in 1681. During the rule of his successor, Dodda Virappa (1687–1736), the army of neighbouring Mysore, then being ruled by the Wodeyar, Chikka Devaraja, attacked and seized Piriyapatna. This was a territory abutting Coorg being ruled by a kinsman of Dodda Virappa (Map 11). Uplifted by the victory, the Mysore army attacked Coorg. It had advanced but a short distance when, camping overnight on the Palupare plain, it was surprised by a Coorg ambush. In the ensuing massacre, 15,000 Mysore soldiers were killed, the survivors beating a hasty retreat. For the next two decades, the western reaches of Mysore remained vulnerable to attacks by the Coorg army. In the border district of Yelusavira, for example, the Coorg and Mysore forces fought to a stalemate and, in the end, had to work out a tax-sharing arrangement.

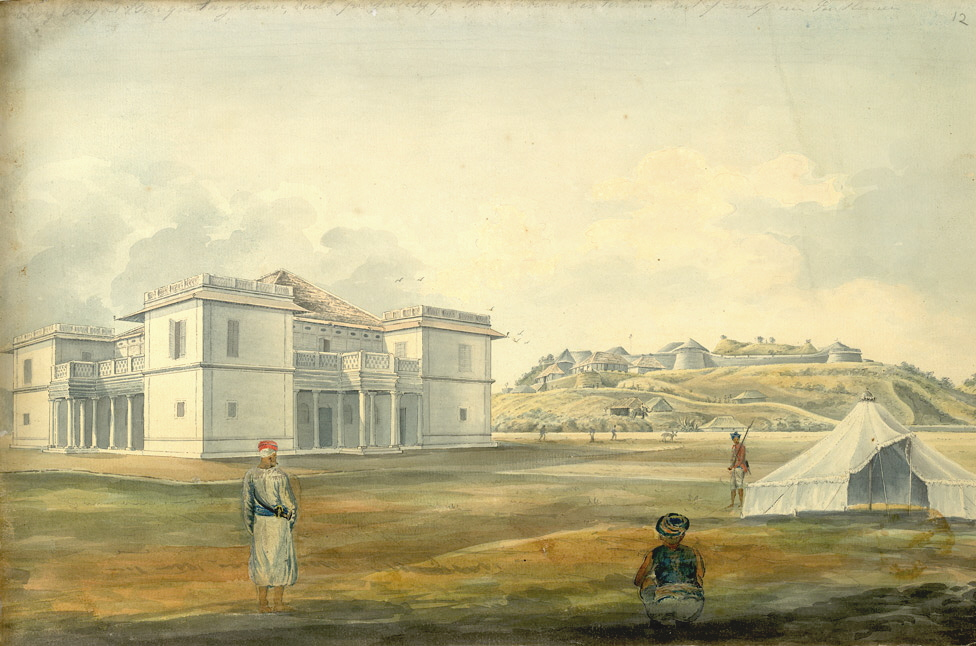
Watercolour of the guest house of the Raja of Coorg with the fort in the background, 1795

In 1724, major hostilities resumed between Coorg and Mysore. Changing his modus operandi of guerrilla skirmishes in the hilly Coorg jungle, Dodda Virappa took to open field warfare against the Mysore army. Catching it off guard, he took in rapid succession six fortresses from Piriyapatna to Arkalgud. The loss of revenue, some 600,000 gold pagodas, was felt in Mysore, and several months later, in August or September 1724, a large army was sent from the Mysore capital Seringapatam to Coorg. At the army's arrival in the western region, the Coorg forces returned to guerrilla warfare, retreating into the woods. Emboldened by the lack of resistance, the Mysore forces attacked the Coorg hills but met no resistance. A few days into their unopposed advance, haunted by the 1690s' ambush, the Mysore forces panicked, retreating during the night. The Coorg army went back to attacking the Mysore outposts. The back-and-forth continued until the Mysore army was recalled to Seringapatam, leaving the region vulnerable to Coorg raids. According to historian Sanjay Subrahmanyam,

The entire episode yields a rare insight into one aspect of war in the 18th century: the (Coorg) forces, lacking cavalry, with a minimum of firearms, lost every major battle, but won the war by dint of two factors. First, the terrain, and the possibility of retreating periodically into the wooded hillside, favoured them, in contrast to their relatively clumsy opponents. Second, the Mysore army could never maintain a permanent presence in the region, given the fact that the Wodeyar kingdom had several open frontiers.

More than a century earlier, Lewis Rice, had written:

Dodda Virappa evinced throughout his long and vigorous reign an unconquerable spirit, and though surrounded by powerful neighbours, neither the number nor the strength of this enemies seems to have relaxed his courage or damped his enterprise. He died in 1736, 78 years old. Two of his wives ascended the funeral pile with the dead body of the Raja.

== Assessment: the period and its historiography ==
From the mid-15th century to the mid-18th century rulers of states in southern India commenced financing wars on a different footing than had their predecessors. According to historian Burton Stein, all the rulers of the Mysore and Coorg region—the Vijayanagara emperors, the Wodeyars of Mysore, the Nayakas of Ikkeri, the Subahdars of Sira, and the Rajas of Coorg—fall to some degree under this category. A similar political system, referred to as "military fiscalism" by French historian Martin Wolfe, took hold in Europe between the 15th and 17th centuries. During this time, according to Wolfe, most regimes in Western Europe emerged from the aristocracy to become absolute monarchies; they simultaneously reduced their dependence on the aristocracy by expanding the tax base and developing an extensive tax collection structure. In Stein's words,

Previously resistant aristocracies were eventually won over in early modern Europe by being offered state offices and honours and by being protected in their patrimonial wealth, but this was only after monarchies had proven their ability to defeat antiquated feudal forces and had found alternative resources in cities and from trade.

In southern India, none of the pre-1760 regimes were able to achieve the "fiscal absolutism" of their European contemporaries. Local chieftains, who had close ties with their social groups, and who had only recently risen from them, opposed the excessive monetary demands of a more powerful regional ruler. Consequently, the larger states of this period in southern India, were not able to entirely change their mode of creating wealth from one of extracting tribute payments, which were seldom regular, to that of direct collection of taxes by government officials. Extorting tribute under threat of military action, according to Stein, is not true "military fiscalism," although it is a means of approaching it. This partial or limited military fiscalism began during the Vijayanagara Empire, setting the latter apart from the more "segmentary" regimes that had preceded it, and was a prominent feature of all regimes during the period 1565–1760; true military fiscalism was not achieved in the region until the rule of Tipu Sultan in the 1780s.

Stein's formulation has been criticized by historian Sanjay Subrahmanyam on account of the lack of extensive historiography for the period. The 18th-century Wodeyar rulers of Mysore—in contrast to their contemporaries in Rajputana, Central India, Maratha Deccan, and Tanjavur—left little or no record of their administrations. Surveying the historiography, Subrahmanyam, says:

A major problem attendant on such generalisations by modern historians concerning pre-1760 Mysore is, however, the paucity of documentation on this older 'Old Regime'.

The first explicit History of Mysore in English is Historical Sketches of the South of India, in an attempt to trace the History of Mysoor by Mark Wilks. Wilks claimed to have based his history on various Kannada language documents, many of which have not survived. According to, all subsequent histories of Mysore have borrowed heavily from Wilks's book for their pre-1760 content. These include Lewis Rice's well-known Gazetteer of 1897 and C. Hayavadana Rao's major revision of the Gazetteer half a century later, and many modern spin-offs of these two works. In Subrahmanyam's words, "Wilks's work is an important one therefore, not only for its own sake, but for its having been regurgitated and reproduced time and again with minor variations."

A Wodeyar dynasty genealogy, the Chikkadevaräya Vamśävali of Tirumalarya, was composed in Kannada during the period 1710–1715, and was claimed to be based on all the then-extant inscriptions in the region. Another genealogy, Kalale Doregala Vamśävali, of the Delvoys, the near-hereditary chief ministers of Mysore, was composed around the turn of the 19th century. However, neither manuscript provides information about administration, economy or military capability. The ruling dynasty's origins, especially as expounded in later palace genealogies, are also of doubtful accuracy; this is, in part, because the Wodeyars, who were reinstated by the British on the Mysore gaddi in 1799, to preside over a fragile sovereignty, "obsessively" attempted to demonstrate their "unbroken" royal lineage, to bolster their then uncertain status.

The earliest manuscript offering clues to governance and military conflict in the pre-1760 Mysore, seems to be Dias (Dias 1725), an annual letter written in Portuguese by a Mysore-based Jesuit missionary, Joachim Dias, and addressed to his Provincial superior. After the East India Company's final 1799 victory over Tipu Sultan, official Company records began to be published as well; these include a collection of Anglo-Mysore Wars-related correspondence between the company's officials in India and Court of Directors in London, and the first report on the new Princely State of Mysore by its resident, Mark Wilks. Around this time, French accounts of the Anglo-Mysore wars appeared as well and included a history of the wars by Joseph-François Michaud, another Jesuit priest. The first attempt at including a comprehensive history of Mysore in an English language work is an account of a survey of South India conducted at Lord Richard Wellesley's request, by Francis Buchanan, a Scottish physician and geographer. By the end of the period of British Commissionership of Mysore (1831–1881), many English language works had begun to appear on a variety of Mysore-related subjects. These included a book of English translations of Kannada language inscriptions by Lewis Rice, and William Digby's two-volume critique of British famine policy during the Great Famine of 1876–78, which devastated Mysore for many years afterwards.,

== See also ==
- Political history of Mysore and Coorg (1761–1799)
- Political history of Mysore and Coorg (1800–1947)
- Company rule in India
- Princely state

== Sources used ==
=== Secondary sources ===
- Richter, G (1870). Manual of Coorg- A Gazetteer of the natural features of the country and the social and political condition of its inhabitants. Mangalore: C Stolz, Basel Mission Book Depository. ISBN 9781333863098.
- Ahmed, Farooqui Salma (2011), A Comprehensive History of Medieval India: From Twelfth to the Mid-Eighteenth Century, Pearson Education, ISBN 978-81-317-3202-1
- Ames, Glenn J. (2000), Renascent Empire? The House of Braganza and the Quest for Stability in Portuguese Monsoon Asia, C. 1640–1683, Amsterdam University Press. p. 262, ISBN 90-5356-382-2
- Asher, Catherine B.; Talbot, Cynthia (2006), India Before Europe, Cambridge University Press, ISBN 978-0-521-80904-7
- Bandyopadhyay, Sekhar (2004), From Plassey to Partition: A History of Modern India, New Delhi and London: Orient Longmans. pp. xx, 548., ISBN 81-250-2596-0
- Bhagavan, Manu (2008), "Princely States and the Hindu Imaginary: Exploring the Cartography of Hindu Nationalism in Colonial India", The Journal of Asian Studies, 67 (3): 881–915, doi:10.1017/S0021911808001198, S2CID 162507058
- Black, Jeremy (1996), The Cambridge Illustrated Atlas of Warfare: Renaissance to Revolution, 1492-1792, Cambridge University Press, ISBN 978-0-521-47033-9
- Brittlebank, Kate (1997), Tipu Sultan's Search for Legitimacy: Islam and Kingship in a Hindu Domain, Oxford University Press, ISBN 978-0-19-563977-3
- Disney, A. R. (1978), Twilight of the Pepper Empire: Portuguese Trade in Southwest India in the Early Seventeenth Century (Harvard Historical Studies), Cambridge, MA: Harvard University Press. p. 222, ISBN 0-674-91429-5
- Gordon, Stewart (2007), The Marathas 1600-1818, Cambridge University Press, ISBN 978-0-521-03316-9
- Hunt, Margaret R.; Stern, Philip J. (2015), The English East India Company at the Height of Mughal Expansion: A Soldier's Diary of the 1689 Siege of Bombay, with Related Documents, Bedford/St. Martin's, pp. 9–, ISBN 978-1-319-04948-5
- Ikegame, Aya (2007), "The capital of rajadharma: modern space and religion in colonial Mysore", International Journal of Asian Studies, 4 (1): 15–44, doi:10.1017/S1479591407000563, S2CID 145718135
- Kamdar, Mira (2018), India in the 21st Century: What Everyone Needs to Know, Oxford University Press, pp. 41–, ISBN 978-0-19-997360-6
- Knipe, David M. (2015), Vedic Voices: Intimate Narratives of a Living Andhra Tradition, Oxford University Press, pp. 40–, ISBN 978-0-19-026673-8
- Manor, James (1975), "Princely Mysore before the Storm: The State-Level Political System of India's Model State, 1920–1936", Modern Asian Studies, 9 (1): 31–58, doi:10.1017/s0026749x00004868, JSTOR 311796, S2CID 146415366
- Michell, George (1995), Architecture and Art of Southern India: Vijayanagara and the successor states: 1350–1750, Cambridge and New York: Cambridge University Press, ISBN 0-521-44110-2
- Michell, George; Zebrowski, Mark (1999), Architecture and Art of the Deccan Sultanates, Cambridge University Press, ISBN 978-0-521-56321-5
- Nagaraj, D. R. (2003), "Critical Tensions in the History of Kannada Literary Culture", in Pollock, Sheldon (ed.), Literary Cultures in History: Reconstructions from South Asia, Berkeley and London: University of California Press. p. 1066, pp. 323–383, ISBN 9780520228214
- Nair, Janaki (2006), "Tipu Sultan, History Painting and the Battle for 'Perspective'", Studies in History, 22 (1): 97–143, doi:10.1177/025764300502200105, S2CID 159522616
- Ramusack, Barbara (2004), The Indian Princes and their States (The New Cambridge History of India), Cambridge and London: Cambridge University Press. p. 324, ISBN 0-521-03989-4
- Ravishankar, Chinya V. (2018), Sons of Sarasvati: Late Exemplars of the Indian Intellectual Tradition, State University of New York Press, ISBN 978-1-4384-7185-3
- Rice, Lewis (1878), "History of Coorg", Mysore and Coorg, A Gazetteer compiled for the Government, Volume 3, Coorg, Bangalore: Mysore Government Press. p. 427
- Rice, Lewis (1897a), "History of Mysore", Mysore: A Gazetteer Compiled for the Government, Volume I, Mysore in General, Westminster: Archibald Constable and Company. pp. xix, 834
- Rice, Lewis (1897b), "History of Districts", Mysore: A Gazetteer Compiled for the Government, Volume II, Mysore, By Districts, Westminster: Archibald Constable and Company. pp. xii, 581
- Rice, Lewis (1908), "History of Mysore and Coorg", Imperial Gazetteer of India, Provincial Series: Mysore and Coorg, Calcutta: Superintendent of Government Printing. pp. xvii, 365, one map.
- Robb, Peter (2011), A History of India, Macmillan, ISBN 978-0-230-34424-2
- Roy, Kaushik (2015), Military Manpower, Armies and Warfare in South Asia, Routledge, ISBN 978-1-317-32128-6
- Roy, Tirthankar (2013), An Economic History of Early Modern India, Routledge, ISBN 978-1-135-04787-0
- Simmons, Caleb (2019), Devotional Sovereignty: Kingship and Religion in India, Oxford University Press, ISBN 978-0-19-008890-3
- Stein, Burton (1985), "State Formation and Economy Reconsidered: Part One", Modern Asian Studies, 19 (3, Special Issue: Papers Presented at the Conference on Indian Economic and Social History, Cambridge University, April 1984): 387–413, doi:10.1017/S0026749X00007678, JSTOR 312446, S2CID 154665616
- Stein, Burton (1987), Vijayanagara (The New Cambridge History of India), Cambridge and New York: Cambridge University Press, ISBN 0-521-26693-9
- Stein, Burton (2013), "Notes on 'peasant Insurgency' in colonial Mysore:event and process", in David Arnold, Peter Robb (ed.), Institutions and Ideologies: A SOAS South Asia Reader, Collected Papers on South Asia, No 10, Routledge, pp. 186–200, 198, ISBN 978-1-136-10234-9
- Subrahmanyam, Sanjay (1989), "Warfare and state finance in Wodeyar Mysore, 1724–25: A missionary perspective", Indian Economic and Social History Review, 26 (2): 203–233, doi:10.1177/001946468902600203, S2CID 145180609
- Subrahmanyam, Sanjay (2002), The Political Economy of Commerce: Southern India 1500–1650, Cambridge University Press, ISBN 978-0-521-89226-1
- Subrahmanyam, Sanjay (2012), Courtly Encounters, Harvard University Press, ISBN 978-0-674-07168-1
- UNESCO; World Heritage Convention (1986), "Group of Monuments at Hampi", World Heritage List, United Nations Educational Scientific and Cultural Organization

=== Primary sources ===
- Buchanan, Francis (1807), A Journey from Madras Through the Countries of Mysore, Canara and Malabar: Performed Under the Orders of the Most Noble the Marquis Wellesley, Governor General of India, ... in the Dominions of the Rajah of Mysore : in Three Volumes, London: Cadell and Davies
- Dias, Joachim, SJ (1725), Relaçāo das couzas succedidas neste reino do Maȳsur desde mayo de 1724 athe agosto de 1725 ("Relation of the events occurring in this kingdom of Mysore between May 1724 and August 1725"), Lisbon: Bibloteca Nacional de Lisboa, Fundo Geral, Códice 178. fls. 40–51v
- Digby, William (1878), The Famine Campaign in Southern India (Madras and Bombay Presidencies and Province of Mysore) 1876–1878, In Two Volumes, London: Longmans, Green, and Co., Volume 1, pp. 515, Volume 2, pp. 492
- East India Company (1800), Copies and Extracts of Advices to and from India, Relative to the Cause, Progress and Successful Termination of the War with the Late Tippoo Sultaun, ..., Printed for the use of the Proprietors of East India Stock
- Michaud, Joseph-François, SJ (1809), Histoire des progrès et de la chute de l'empire de Mysore, sous les règnes d'Hyder-Aly et de Tippoo-Saïb: contenant l'historique des guerres des souverains de Mysore avec les Anglais et les différentes puissances de l'Inde, Paris: Chez Guiget et C^{ie.}
- Rice, Lewis (1879), Mysore Inscriptions: Translated for Government, Bangalore: Mysore Government Press. p. 336
- Wilks, Mark (1805), Report on the Interior Administration, Resources, and Expenditure of the Government of Mysoor, Fort William: By Order of the Governor General in Council. p. 161
- Wilks, Mark (1811) [1st edition: 1811, volume 1; 1817, volumes 2 and 3; second edition: 1869], Historical Sketches of the South of India in an attempt to trace the History of Mysoor, Second Edition, Madras: Higginbotham and Co. pp. xxxii, 527
