= British Committee of the Indian National Congress =

1889 organisation

The British Committee of the Indian National congress was an organization established in Britain by the Indian National Congress in 1889. Its purpose was to raise awareness of Indian issues to the public in Britain, to whom the Government of India was responsible. It followed the work of W.C. Bonnerjee and Dadabhoi Naoroji, who raised India related issues in the British parliament through the support of radical MPs like Charles Bradlaugh. William Wedderburn served as the first chairmanship and William Digby as secretary.

== History ==
The decades following the 1857 rebellion were a period of growing political awareness in India, moulding of Indian public opinion for self-governance, and emergence of Indian leadership at both national and provincial levels. Dadabhai Naoroji formed the East India Association in 1867 and Surendranath Banerjee founded the Indian National Association in 1876. The Congress was founded in 1885 by Indian and British members of the Theosophical Society movement, including Scotsman Allan Octavian Hume. Its objective was to obtain a greater share in government for educated Indians and to create a platform for civic and political dialogue between educated Indians and the British Raj. From its inception, the organisation met annually to express its loyalty to the British Raj and passed numerous resolutions on less controversial issues such as civil rights or opportunities in government (especially in the civil service). These resolutions were submitted to the Viceroy's government.

Alan Octavian Hume left India in 1894 to return to Britain. At the time of his departure, Hume held the opinion that to implement political change and self-governance in India, political work was required in Britain to raise awareness of Indian issues among the British public. William Wedderburn held the same train of thought, since the Government of India was constitutionally responsible to the British electorate. Congress leaders like Dadabhai Naoroji and W.C. Bonnerjee had been able to enlist the support of radical MP Charles Bradlaugh to take up Indian issues in the British Parliament.

In 1888 the Congress recruited an agency in Britain to publicise Indian issues to the British public. Headed by Digby, this organisation arranged public lectures in England and began public distribution of pamphlets highlighting issues in India. In July 1889, a permanent committee was established with William Wedderburn as chairman and William Digby as secretary. Bradlaugh died in 1891, but the British committee of the Congress had been able to establish an Indian Parliamentary Committee pressure group.

In 1903, Henry Cotton, a radical politician, joined the committee and rapidly became the leading member of Labour party MPs who formed the core group of the parliamentary committee. Cotton's efforts championed, among others, the labour-rights of tea-plantation workers in Assam. Among other notable members of the committee was Keir Hardie. The British Committee of the Congress continued to function up to 1920, when it lost its support in the Congress due to a decline in moderatist membership, and it was abolished.

== Activities ==
The British Committee published the journal India as an organ for the Congress's views. It also organised public meetings. The influence of its early works resulted in the Indian Councils Act 1892. However, its moderatist approach came in for criticism by politicians like Henry Hyndman, who advocated more radical approaches including "insurrection" and violence. Indian nationalists like Shyamji Krishna Varma castigated what he saw as the timid approach of the Congress's British committee. Krishna Varma later founded India House with the support of Hyndman and other radical Indian nationalists. To counter the India, he began publishing his own radical journal called The Indian Sociologist.

== See also ==
- History of the Indian National Congress

== Sources ==
- Fischer-Tinē, Harald (2007). "Indian Nationalism and the 'world forces': Transnational and diasporic dimensions of the Indian freedom movement on the eve of the First World War". Journal of Global History. 2 (3). Cambridge University Press.: 325–344. doi:10.1017/S1740022807002318. ISSN 1740-0228. S2CID 145323846.
- Sen, S.N. (1997). History of the Freedom Movement in India (1857–1947). New Delhi: New Age International. ISBN 8122410499. Archived from the original on 26 November 2015.
- Owen, Nicholas (2007), The British Left and India, Oxford, UK: Oxford University Press, ISBN 978-0-19-923301-4.
