= The Poverty Problem in India =

1895 book by Prithwis Chandra Ray

The Poverty Problem in India: Being a Dissertation on the Causes and Remedies of Indian Poverty
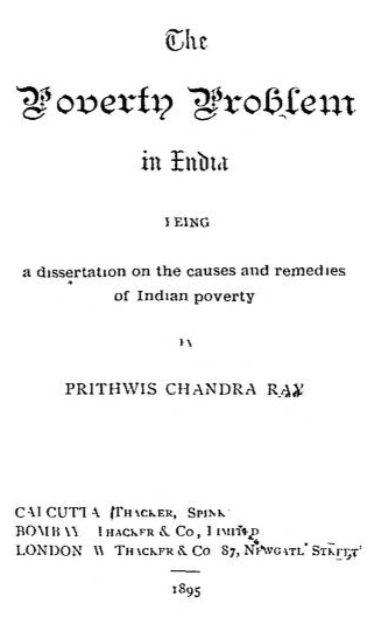
- Title page for The Poverty Problem in India: Being a Dissertation on the Causes and Remedies of Indian Poverty (1895)
- Author: Prithwis Chandra Ray
- Publisher: Thacker, Spink & Company
- Publication date: 1895

The Poverty Problem in India was a book published in 1895 by Prithwis Chandra Ray that analyzed various factors that were leading India to become increasingly impoverished under British rule. The book was influential and used extensively as a reference in other works and economic analysis in India throughout the twentieth century.

== See also ==
- 'Prosperous' British India
- Poverty in India
- British Raj
