= Indian Councils Act 1892 =

Act of the Parliament of the United Kingdom

Indian Councils Act 1892 (Note: Section 8.)
- Act of Parliament
- Parliament of the United Kingdom
- Long title: An Act to amend the Indian Councils Act, 1861.
- Citation: 55 & 56 Vict. c. 14
- Introduced by: R. A. Cross, 1st Viscount Cross on 9 February 1892 (Lords)
- Territorial extent: United Kingdom; British India

Dates
- Royal assent: 20 June 1892
- Commencement: 20 June 1892 (Note: The Acts of Parliament (Commencement) Act 1793.)
- Repealed: 1 January 1916
Other legislation
Amends	Indian Councils Act 1861
Amended by	Indian Councils Act 1909
Repealed by	Government of India Act 1915

Status: Repealed

Text of statute as originally enacted

The Indian Councils Act 1892 (55 & 56 Vict. c. 14) was an act of the Parliament of the United Kingdom that introduced various amendments to the composition and function of legislative councils in British India. Most notably, the act expanded the number of members in the central and provincial councils. For example, the number of additional members elected to the Governor-General's council (Note: The Governor-General's Council also is called the Viceroy's Council and the Central Council.) was increased from twelve to sixteen members of whom – as per the Indian Councils Act 1861 (24 & 25 Vict. c. 67) – not less than half were to be non-officials, i.e. persons not in the civil or military service of the Crown. The Governor-General was empowered to invite different bodies in India to elect, select or delegate their representatives and to make regulations for their nomination.

After being presented to the House of Lords in 1890, the act was passed in 1892 in response to nationalist movements beginning to surface across British India. This scheme would be overturned by the passage of the Indian Councils Act 1909 (9 Edw. 7. c. 4) – also called the Morley-Minto reforms – which introduced indirect elections to Indian councils along with special electoral preferences for Muslim minorities and various commercial and functional interests.

== Membership ==
Under the regulations adopted, the Governor-General's council was to consist of nine ex-officio members (the Governor-General, six members of the Executive Council, the Commander-in-Chief, and the head of the province in which the council shiva met), six official additional members and ten non-official members of the Legislative Councils of Bengal, Bombay, Madras and the Northwestern province. When Legislative Councils were established in Punjab and Burma, one member each was returned from these also. In conjunction with the ex-officio members, the official members constituted a majority.

Similar changes were introduced in the composition of provincial legislative Councils. In all the provinces – with some exception in Bombay – an official majority, (Note: An official majority being when a majority of councillors are British civil service or military officials.) while not required by statute, was maintained.

While the Central Legislative Council was expanded to include between 10 and 16 Additional Members, specifics in provinces varied: Bombay came to have 8 Additional Members; Madras 20; Bengal 20; Northwestern Province & Oudh 15.

The universities, district board, municipalities, zamindars and chambers of commerce were empowered to recommend members to provincial councils. While such recommendations could theoretically be rejected, in practice, they were not refused. Thus, while failing to answer calls for direct elections, the principle of representation was introduced.

== Council powers ==
In addition to these changes, the act relaxed restrictions imposed by the Indian Councils Act 1861 (24 & 25 Vict. c. 67) in allowing councils to discuss – but not vote on – each year's annual financial statement. Councillors could also put questions within certain limits to the government on the matter of public interest after giving six days' notice, but none of them had the right to ask supplementary questions.

== Subsequent developments ==
The whole act was repealed by section 130 of, and the fourth schedule to, the Government of India Act 1915 (5 & 6 Geo. 5. c. 61), which came into force on 1 January 1916.

== See also ==
- Indian National Congress
- British Committee of the Indian National Congress
- William Wedderburn
- Dadabhai Naoroji
- Indian Councils Act 1909

== Bibliography ==
- Ilbert, Courtenay (1898). The Government of India: Being a Digest of the Statute Law Relating Thereto. Oxford: Clarendon Press.
- Ilbert, Courtenay (1911). "The Indian Councils Act, 1909". Journal of the Society of Comparative Legislation. 11 (2): 243–254. ISSN 1479-5973. JSTOR 752520.
