= 'Prosperous' British India =

1901 book

'Prosperous' British India: A Revelation from Official Records
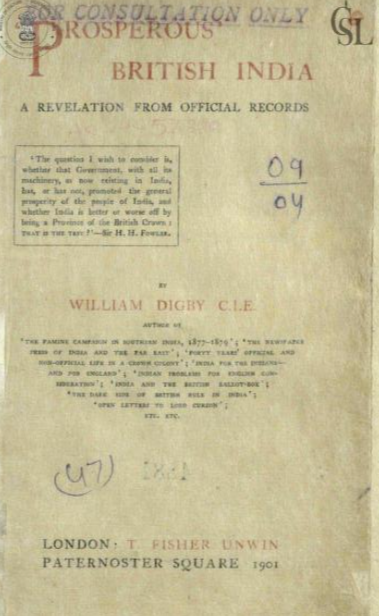
- Title page for 'Prosperous' British India: A Revelation from Official Records (1901)
- Author: William Digby
- Language: English
- Subject: 19th Century India
- Publisher: T. Fisher Unwin
- Publication date: 1901
- Publication place: England

'Prosperous' British India, more completely titled 'Prosperous' British India: A Revelation from Official Records, was a book published in 1901 by British author William Digby that described the economic conditions prevailing in British India in the latter half of the nineteenth century under British rule. It used official government statistics to illuminate the falling incomes and increasing impoverishment in India under British administration during that period. The book was influential and, at the time, attracted attention due to the imprinting of the actual falling per-capita income statistics in gold on the spine of the book itself. The book also used government statistics to demonstrate that the death-toll and frequency of catastrophic economic disasters in India, such as famines, was growing systematically under British rule.

== See also ==
- William Digby (writer)
- The Poverty Problem in India
- Poverty in India
- British Raj
