= Cheluvambe =

Consort of Dodda Krishnaraja I

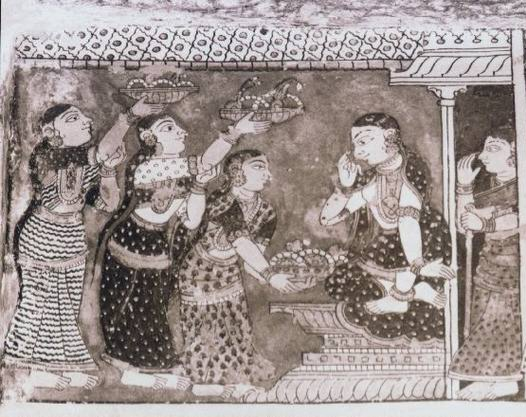
- Possible depiction of Cheluvambe being presented with jewellery, Shravanabelagola, c.18th century
- Born: Kalale, Kingdom of Mysore
- Died: 18th century, Mysore, Kingdom of Mysore
- Spouse: Dodda Krishnaraja I
- House: Wodeyar (by marriage) Kalale (by birth)
- Father: Kalale Kantharaja

Rani Cheluvambe was Queen consort of the Kingdom of Mysore as the wife of Dodda Krishnaraja I, the sixteenth Maharaja of the Wadiyar Dynasty.

== Life ==
Cheluvambe belonged to the prominent Kalale family, and was the daughter of Kalale Kantharaja; a chieftain (dalavayi) of Kalale in Nanjangud. Cheluvambe was married to the sixteenth Wodeyar king Dodda Krishnaraja and became his asta mahishi (consort). The marriage of Cheluvambe to the Maharaja further strengthened the influence of the Kalale clan, who secured domestic power through marriages with the Wodeyar Dynasty.

Chevulambe was a gifted poet, composer, and musician. Her creative repertoire consisted of works such as the Venkatakala Mahatmyam Lali (a cycle of 203 songs) – a lullaby song written in the metre of choupadi (4 line verse) in devotion to Venkateshwara, the Alamelu Mangamma which was a collection of 35 songs understood to have been written as an ode to Goddess Alamelu Manga; the consort of Venkateshwara, a prose commentary on the Tulakaveri Mahatmyam, and songs in praise of the god Cheluvanarayana. Her compositions of lullabies are written under the Viprakirna Prabandha tradition, a structural classification in carnatic music.

Her most notable work is the Varanandi Kalyana (The journey of Varanandi) written around 1725-1730. The work is written in the sangatya metre, and narrates the story of the northern princess Varanandi, a daughter of the Badshah (emperor) of Delhi who became a devotee of the god Cheluvaraya of Melkote. In the Varanandi Kalyana, Cheluvambe envisoned Varanandi to be a reincarnation of Satyabhama, the third consort of Krishna.
