= Dodda Krishnaraja I =

Maharaja of Mysore from 1714 to 1732

Krishnaraja Wodeyar I
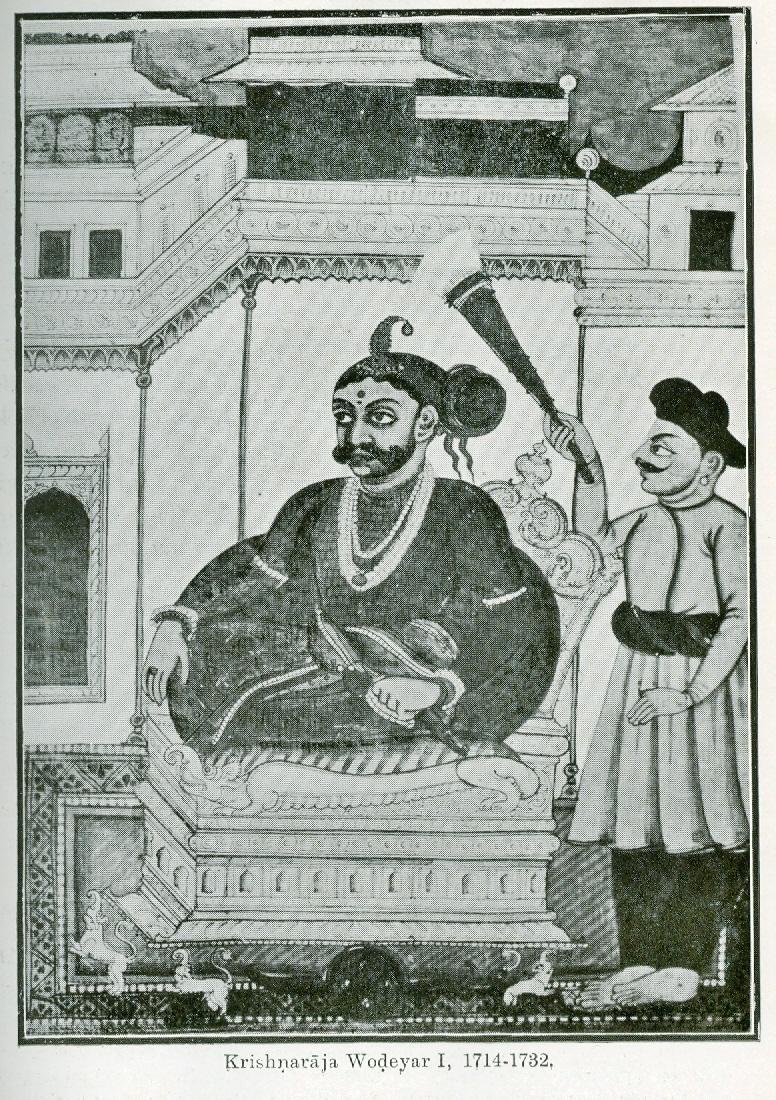
- Dodda Krishnaraja I, ruler of Mysore

Maharaja of Mysore
- Reign: 1714 – 5 March 1732
- Coronation: 3 March 1714
- Predecessor: Narasaraja Wodeyar II (father)
- Successor: Chamaraja Wodeyar VII (adoptive son)
- Born: 18 February 1702
- Died: 5 March 1732 (aged 30)
- Spouse: Devaja Ammani (Devajamma) Avaru; Cheluvambe; Chelvaja Ammani Avaru; Kanle Ammani Avaru (9 wives)
- Issue: Unnamed son Chamaraja Wodeyar VII (son) Krishnaraja Wodeyar II (son)
Names
- Dodda Krishnaraja Wodeyar
- House: Wodeyar
- Father: Narasaraja Wodeyar II
- Mother: Chelvaja Ammani Avaru

Krishnaraja Wodeyar I (18 February 1702 – 5 March 1732) was the sixteenth maharaja of the Kingdom of Mysore. His reign lasted for 18 years, from 1714 to 1732.

== Personal life ==
Dodda Krishnaraja was born on 18 February 1702. He was the first-born son of Kanthirava Narasaraja II, by his second wife Maharani Chelvaja Ammani Devi. A month before his tenth birthday—upon his father's death—he acceded to the throne of Mysore. Although he was married nine times, direct descents in the Wodeyar lineage stopped with him; a son was born to his first wife, but died aged six months. Dodda Krishnaraja died on 5 March 1732 at the age of 29, and was succeeded by his relative's son, Chamaraja Wodeyar VII.

== Demands of neighbours ==
Just before Dodda Krishnaraja I's accession, a change had come in the governance of the Mughal province of Sira (Carnatic Bijapur) to the north and northeast of Mysore. In 1713, Carnatic-Bijapur was split into a payanghat jurisdiction with capital at Arcot and governed by a newly styled Nawab of Arcot, and a balaghat jurisdiction, governed by a newly styled Nawab of Sira. That same year, the governor of Carnatic-Bijapur, Sadat-ulla Khan, was made the new Nawab of Arcot, and Amin Khan was appointed Nawab of Sira; Mysore, however, remained a formal tributary state of Sira. This division, and the resulting loss of revenue from the rich maidān region of Mysore, made Sadat-ulla Khan unhappy and, in collusion with the rulers of Kadapa, Kurnool, Savanur, and the Maratha Raja of Gutti, he decided to march against Krishnaraja Wodeyar I. However, the Nawab of Sira, anxious to preempt the coalition's action, hit upon a plan himself of reaching the then-Mysore capital, Seringapatam. In the end, both Nawabs—of Arcot and Sira—settled upon a joint invasion led by the former. Krishnaraja Wodeyar I, for his part, was able to "buy off this formidable confederacy" by offering a tribute of Rs. 10 million. This outcome, however, made Mysore vulnerable to similar future claims, which, for example, were made successfully two years later by Maratha raiders who appeared in the Mysore capital. The resulting depletion of the Mysore treasury led Mysore to itself attack and absorb the poligar chiefdom of Magadi to its north.

== Abdication ==
Wilks 1811 gave a decidedly negative appraisal of the maharaja's character:

"Whatever portion of vigour or of wisdom appeared in the conduct of this reign belonged exclusively to the ministers, who secured their own authority by appearing with affected humility to study in all things the inclinations and wishes of the Maharaja. Weak and capricious in his temper, he committed the most cruel excesses on the persons and property of those who approached him, and as quickly restored them to his favour. While no opposition was made to an establishment of almost incredible absurdity, amounting to a lakh of rupees annually, for the maintenance of an almshouse to feed beasts of prey, reptiles, and insects; he believed himself to be an unlimited despot; and, while amply supplied with the means of sensual pleasure, to which he devoted the largest portion of his time, he thought himself the greatest and the happiest of monarchs, without understanding, or caring to understand, during a reign of nineteen years, the troublesome details through which he was supplied with all that is necessary for animal gratification."

According to Rice 1897a, pp. 370, the Maharaja's lack of interest in the affairs of state soon led two dalvoys, or ministers, Devaraja, the army chief, and his cousin, Nanjaraja, who was both the revenue minister and the privy councillor, to wield all authority in the kingdom. After Krishnaraja Wodeyar I's death in 1736, the dalvoys would appoint "puppet maharajas," and effectively rule Mysore until the rise of Haidar Ali in 1760.

Mysore at the end of the seventeenth century.

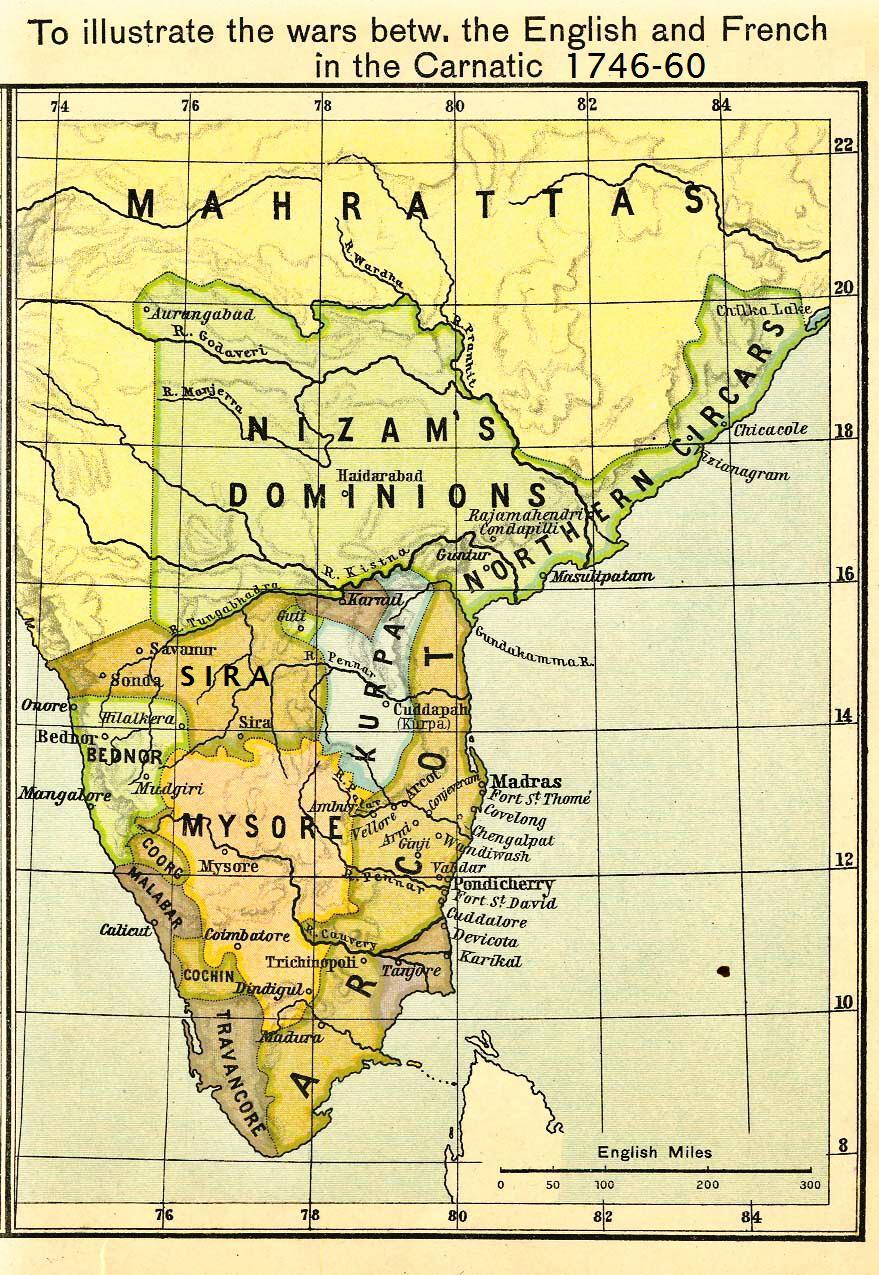
The Mughal provinces of Sira and Arcot shown in a map of South India at the time of the Anglo-French Wars in the Carnatic

== See also ==
- Province of Sira
- History of Mysore and Coorg, 1565–1760
