= Kanthirava Narasaraja II =

Maharaja of Mysore from 1704 to 1714

15th Maharaja of Mysore
- Reign: 30 November 1704 – March 1714
- Predecessor: Chikka Devaraja (father)
- Successor: Dodda Krishnaraja I (son)
- Born: 27 December 1672
- Died: March 1714 (aged 41)
- Issue: Dodda Krishnaraja I
Names
- Mukarasu Kantheerava Narasaraja II
- House: Wodeyar
- Father: Chikka Devaraja
- Mother: Devajammanni

Kanthirava Narasaraja II (27 December 1672 – March 1714) was the fifteenth maharaja of the Kingdom of Mysore from 1704 to 1714. He was born deaf and came to be called Múk-arasu (literally "mute king"). He succeeded to the throne through the influence of the prime minister, Tirumala Iyengar. During his reign, his dalvoy (chief of the army), who was also named Kanthirava, led an expedition to subdue Chikkaballapur, but was killed during the fighting. His son later took over and succeeded in establishing Mysore's suzerainty.
