= Harald Fischer-Tiné =

Historian and academic born in 1966

- Born: 1966 (age 59–60); Saarlouis, West Germany

Academic background
- Alma mater: Heidelberg University

Academic work
- Discipline: History
- Sub-discipline: Global history; South Asian history; Colonial history
- Institutions: Humboldt University of Berlin; Jacobs University Bremen; ETH Zurich

Harald Fischer-Tiné (born 1966) is a historian and professor of Modern Global History at ETH Zürich, Switzerland. His research focuses on the social and cultural history of colonial South Asia and the British Empire. His publications include studies of European communities in British India and Indian anti-colonial nationalism.

== Biography ==
Born in 1966 in Saarlouis, Germany, Fischer-Tiné studied South Asian history, modern Indology and political science at Heidelberg University and in Agra, India, where he did a Diploma of Hindi Proficiency from the Central Institute of Hindi (Kendriya Hindi Sansthan) in Agra, India, in 1993. Completing his master's degree in South Asian history in 1995, followed by a doctorate from Heidelberg University in 2000. His doctoral research examined the Gurukula Kangri University (Gurukula Kangri Vishwavidyalaya) and its relationship with Hindu reform movements and nationalist education in colonial India. This was followed by habilitation at Heidelberg in 2007 with a study of marginalised European communities in British India.

Fischer-Tiné started his career by teaching South Asian history at Heidelberg University from 1998 to 2000 and at the Humboldt University of Berlin from 2000 to 2006. He subsequently joined Jacobs University Bremen (now known as Constructor University), where he taught history between 2006 and 2008. In August 2008, he was appointed professor of History of the Modern World at ETH Zurich. He was a fellow at the Lichtenberg-Kolleg of the University of Göttingen from February to July 2012.

== Selected publications ==
- Fischer-Tiné, Harald (2003). Der Gurukul-Kangri oder die Erziehung der Arya-Nation: Kolonialismus, Hindureform und nationale Bildung in Britisch-Indien (1897–1922) [The Gurukul Kangri or the Education of the Arya Nation: Colonialism, Hindu Reform and National Education in British India (1897–1922)] (in German). Ergon Verlag. ISBN 9783899132892.
- Fischer-Tiné, Harald (2009). Low and Licentious Europeans: Race, Class and 'White Subalternity' in Colonial India. Orient BlackSwan. ISBN 9788125037019.
- Fischer-Tiné, Harald (2013). Pidgin-Knowledge: Wissen und Kolonialismus [Pidgin Knowledge: Knowledge and Colonialism] (in German). Diaphanes. ISBN 9783037343777.
- Fischer-Tiné, Harald (2014). Shyamji Krishnavarma: Sanskrit, Sociology and Anti-Imperialism. Routledge. ISBN 9780415445542.
- Fischer-Tiné, Harald (2023). The YMCA in Late Colonial India: Modernization, Philanthropy and American Soft Power in South Asia. Bloomsbury Academic. ISBN 9789354358074.
