= William Digby (writer) =

British author, journalist and humanitarian

- Born: 1 May 1849; Wisbech
- Died: 29 September 1904 (aged 55)
- Occupations: Journalist; politician
- Spouse(s): Ellen Amelia Little; Sarah Maria Hutchinson
- Writing career
- Period: 1878–1901
- Subjects: Politics, Famines, India
- Notable works: Famine Campaigns in Southern India; Prosperous British India

William Digby (1 May 1849 – 29 September 1904) was a British author, journalist, and humanitarian.

== Early life and career ==
William Digby was born in Wisbech, Cambridgeshire on 1 May 1849. He did his apprenticeship with the Isle of Ely and Wisbech Advertiser. He was employed at the Sussex Advertiser from 1864 to 1871. He was married twice – first to Ellen Amelia Little in 1874 (who died in 1878) and then to Sara Maria Hutchinson in 1879. William Digby moved to the Indian subcontinent in 1871 and worked as a sub-editor in The Ceylon Observer., and as the editor of The Madras Times in 1877. He also worked as the editor of the Liverpool and Southport Daily News in 1880 and that of the Plymouth Daily Western Mercury in 1879. He served as senior partner of William Hutchinson and Company in 1887.

== Activism and politics ==
While working in Sri Lanka, Digby was involved in a temperance campaign and another one for abolishing food taxes.

=== Famine relief ===
While working in India, he witnessed the Great Famine of 1876–78 and involved himself in relief works. He served as the Honorary Secretary of the executive committee of the Famine Relief Fund. He opposed the laissez faire famine relief policies of the Famine Commissioner, Sir Richard Temple and argued for more Government aid in mitigating the effects of famine. In 1878 he wrote an extensive book about the famine titled The Famine Campaign in Southern India.Vol I and Vol II. For his contribution to the famine relief works, he was made a Companion of the Order of the Indian Empire (C.I.E) in 1878. The failure of the Government of British India to provide effective famine relief made William Digby an outspoken critic of the British Government's India policy.

=== Liberal politics ===
Digby returned to England in 1879 after his first wife's death. In November 1882 he became the first secretary of the National Liberal Club, a post he held till 1887. He advocated full economic and racial equality, then representative Government and eventually Self-Government for the Indians. He published Indian Problems for English Consideration in 1881. In it, Digby argued that Indian reform was 'a Liberal duty', and defined India as 'a larger Ireland'. Digby was an admirer of Lord Ripon and published a pamphlet in February 1885 titled India for the Indians -and for England in defence of Ripon. He contested the 1885 General Election as a Liberal Party candidate from the Paddington North constituency on a platform of legislative reform in India. He lost to Conservative Party candidate Lionel Louis Cohen by a margin of 685 votes (out of a total of 5345 polled).

=== The Indian Agency ===
In May 1888 he set up the Indian Political and General Agency in London for the purpose of raising awareness about Indian grievances in the British Parliament and Press. He served as its secretary during 1887–1892. He became a strong advocate of constitutional reform and acted as an unofficial guide to Indian National Congress leaders visiting London. He used his political contacts (obtained through his position as the secretary of the National Liberal Club) to raise India's grievances in the British Public sphere. Through his lobbying he was able to get Charles Bradlaugh to attend the Fifth INC Conference held at Bombay in 1889. Bradlaugh also agreed to introduce a bill in British Parliament for establishing legislative councils in India. During this time Digby also worked as the editor of the Congress journal India. Though he was well paid for his efforts, the Congress office bearers in India delayed paying the expenditure for his lobbying efforts. Digby met those expenditures by doing private lobbying for the Maharaja of Kashmir. As part of his lobbying, he wrote a book titled "Condemned Unheard" advocating the Kashmiri king's position. This private lobbying and incidents of Digby and Bradlaugh receiving money from the Kashmiri king for presenting petitions to and raising questions in parliament alarmed Allan Octavian Hume. Hume set up the "British Committee of the Indian National Congress" to oversee the Indian Agency's work. The Committee did not want payments to be made to Bradlaugh through its books and completely ended its association with the Indian Agency in 1890. Digby served as the secretary to the British Committee from 1889 to 1892. Digby's continuing private lobbying efforts were a major embarrassment to the Congress and it cut its connections to Digby in September 1892. This ended Digby's association with the Indian National Congress.

=== 1892 election ===
Digby contested the 1892 General Election as the Liberal candidate from the South Islington parliamentary constituency. He lost to the Conservative candidate Albert Rollit by 321 votes.

== Death ==
Digby died on 29 September 1904 and was buried in Bromley Cemetery. Condoling his death, The Hindu Organ wrote that "..his death is a great loss to all eastern subjects of His Majesty". Gandhi wrote an obituary in the Indian Opinion on 29 October 1904 which praised him as follows :

By the death of William Digby CIE, India has lost a champion, whom it will be difficult to replace. His advocacy of the Indian cause was strenuous and well-informed... By his voluminous writings, the late Mr. Digby ever kept the different Indian questions before the public.

== Bibliography ==
- The Famine Campaign in Southern India: Madras and Bombay Presidencies and province of Mysore, 1876–1878, Vol. 1 and Vol. 2 (1878)
- Forty Years of Official and Unofficial Life in an Oriental Crown Colony, being the Life of Sir Richard Morgan (1879)
- Indian Problems for English Consideration (1881)
- India for the Indians — and for England (1885)
- The general election, 1885. India's interest in the British ballot box (1885)
- 1857: A friend in need 1887: Friendship forgotten, An episode in Indian Foreign Office Administration (1890)
- Condemned Unheard: The Government of India and H.H. the Maharaja of Kashmir : a Letter to the Rt. Hon. Sir Ughtred Kay-Shuttleworth (1890)
- Prosperous British India – A Revelation from Official Records (1901)

== See also ==
- 'Prosperous' British India
- Political history of Mysore and Coorg (1565–1760)
- British Raj
