= Mark Wilks =

Madras Army officer, historian and colonial administrator

Col. Mark Wilks FRS
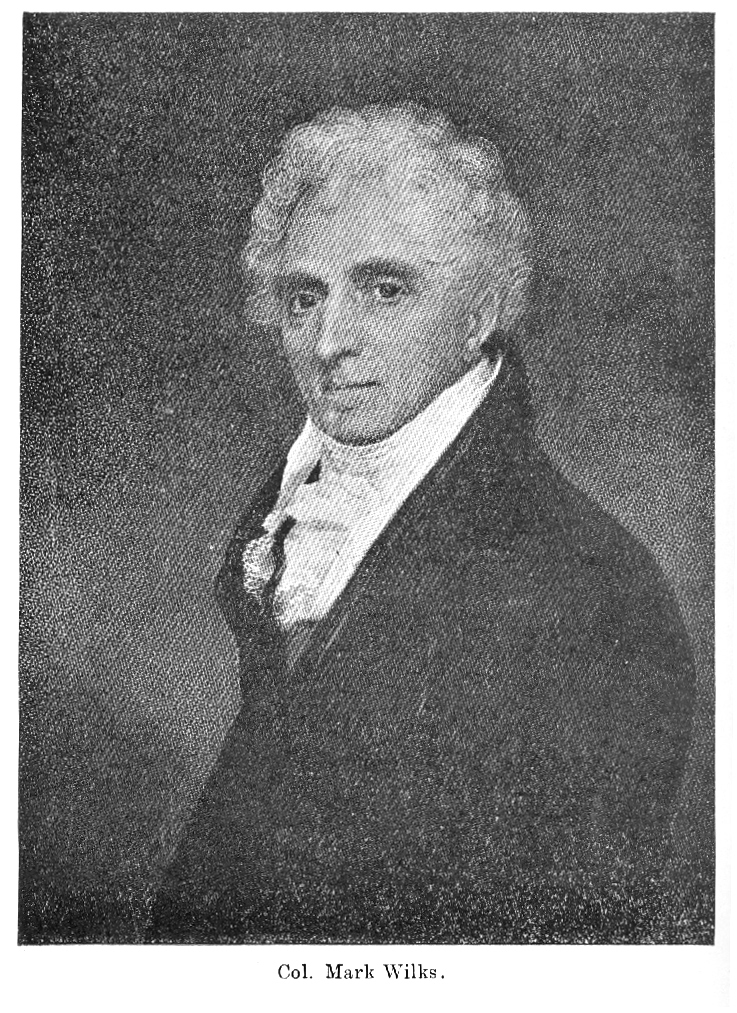

Speaker of the House of Keys
- Monarch: King William IV
- Lieutenant Governor: John Ready

Personal details
- Born: 1759 Douglas, Isle of Man
- Died: 19 September 1831 (aged 71–72) Kelloe House, Berwickshire
- Party: Independent
- Parents: Elizabeth (née Christian); Rev. James Wilks
- Profession: Army officer; historian; colonial governor; politician

Colonel Mark Wilks SHK, FRS (1759 – 19 September 1831) was a Madras Army officer, historian and colonial administrator who worked in southern India principally in the princely state of Mysore. He was the acting Resident at the Wodeyar Court.

== Life ==
He was born at Kirk Michael vicarage in the Isle of Man, the son of Rev. James Wilks and Elisabeth Christian, and came from a lineage of Manx landed gentry. He was named after his godfather, Bishop Mark Hiddesley.

His father was a contemporary of Bishop Wilson. He purchased cadetship through Sir Henry Fletcher, in the court of the Directors of the East India Company in 1781 at the age of 18, joining the Madras Army. He was commissioned an officer in 1782 and like others, he was trained at Fort St. George, he picked up Persian. He translated the Persian poet Nasir-ud-din's work Aklak-i-Naseri into English. Wilks served as a secretary to the Military Board in 1787, accompanying Sir Barry Close on a diplomatic mission to Mysore.

His early education included Greek and Latin classics, of which he would later promote the study by his nephew Mark Cubbon. He served as the Town Major at Fort Saint George around 1788, the capital of Madras Presidency.

After a furlough in England Wilks became a private secretary to Lord Edward Clive. Wilks served alongside General James Stuart during the storming of Srirangapatna resulting in the death of Tipu Sultan in May 1799, receiving the approbation of Arthur Wellesley. Wilks was then sent to Basra, from where he returned to India in 1803 to be appointed Resident at Mysore.

He wrote several historical works including, Report on the Internal Administration of Mysore. This was a continuation of a report on the survey of the Kingdom of Mysore undertaken by Lieut. Col. Colin Mackenzie. He also wrote the book Historical Sketches of the South of India in an attempt to trace the History of Mysoor. This also relates to the works of Lieut. Col. Colin Mackenzie. Mark Wilks was the uncle of Mark Cubbon who was the Commissioner of Mysore and after whom the Cubbon Park in Bangalore is named.

After his return from India, Mark Wilks, with the active help and co-operation of James Kirkpatrick, the East India Company (EIC) Resident at Hyderabad, wrote one of the first histories of medieval South India: Historical Sketches of the South of India. This volume examined the rise of the Mysore Wodeyar dynasty in the confusion following the fall of Vijayanagara in 1565. Wilks denounced the reign of Haidar Ali and Tipu Sultan in his historical enquiries and sought to find the causes for the decline of the Vijaynagar Empire.

In 1813 he was appointed Governor for three years of Saint Helena where the exiled former French Emperor Napoleon is said to have found Wilks a highly engaging and affable man. Saint Helena was chiefly a center for the slave-trade, which Wilks did not prohibit. He employed the services of Samuel Ally, a freed slave, who returned with Wilks to the Isle of Man and took employ as his servant. Wilks invited William Roxburgh to study the possibility of cultivating cinchona. After the British government took temporary control of St Helena from the EIC during Napoleon's time on St Helena, Wilks return to England in 1816 and was elected to the Manx parliament, the House of Keys. In 1826, after the death of his father-in-law, he became Speaker of the house. A portrait of Mark Wilks still hangs in the Tynwald building in Douglas.

In February 1826, as Colonel Mark Wilks, he was elected a Fellow of the Royal Society.

He married twice. In 1813 he married his second wife, Dorothy Taubman, daughter of his predecessor as Speaker. He had a son John Barry (named after Barry Close) who died young and a daughter, Laura, who married General Sir John Buchan KCB of Kelloe House, Berwickshire, where Wilks died on a visit in 1839.

Sir Mark Wilks Collet, 1st Baronet was his great-great nephew. Their papers are held together at the Manx National Heritage Library and Archives.
