= B. Lewis Rice =

British historian and archaeologist

Benjamin Lewis Rice
- Born: 17 July 1837; Bangalore, Mysore State
- Died: 10 July 1927 (aged 89); Harrow, London, England
- Occupations: Historian, archaeologist, epigraphist, educationist, writer
- Spouse(s): Mary Sophia Garrett, daughter of John Garrett

Benjamin Lewis Rice CIE (17 July 1837 – 10 July 1927), popularly known as B. L. Rice, was a British historian, archaeologist and educationist. He is known for his pioneering work in deciphering inscriptions, especially in Kannada, and in Sanskrit inscriptions in the Kingdom of Mysore and is eulogized as Shasanapitamaha (transl. Grandsire of Epigraphy) or Purathathva Pitamaha (transl. Grandsire of Archaeology) Rice's researches were published as the voluminous Epigraphia Carnatica which contains translations of about 9000 inscriptions he found in the Old Mysore area. Rice also compiled the much acclaimed Mysore Gazetteer which still remains the primary source of information for most places in Mysore and neighbouring Coorg. Rice served with distinction in the Mysore civil service and as first Director of the Mysore State Archaeology Department.

== Early life and education ==
Benjamin Lewis Rice was born in Bangalore on 17 July 1837 to Rev. Benjamin Holt Rice who was associated with the London Missionary Society (LMS). Rev. Rice was a Kannada scholar and wrote books in Kannada on arithmetic, geography and history. He even brought forth a Kannada translation of the Bible. The Rice Memorial Church, located at Avenue Road, Bangalore is named after Rev. Benjamin Holt Rice. Rice had his early education in Mysore State and graduated in the United Kingdom in 1860.

== Career ==
Upon graduating, Rice returned to India where he was appointed Principal of the Bangalore High School (later Central College). Five years later, he joined the Mysore Civil Service as Inspector of Schools for Mysore and Coorg. In 1868, he acted as Director of Public Instruction when John Garrett returned to the United Kingdom on leave where he introduced the 'hobli school system'

From 1881 to 1883, Rice served as Chief Census Officer for Mysore State and was in 1883, appointed Secretary of the Education Department of Mysore. He was a member of Royal Asiatic Society elected in 1879.

In 1884, Rice was appointed head of the Mysore State Archaeology Department, the first to occupy the post. As the head of the archaeological department, Rice toured the whole of the state from 1886 till his retirement in 1906, documenting his findings in the Epigraphia Carnatica.

== Epigraphy ==
Rice's interest in epigraphy was triggered when in 1873, a certain Major Dixon showed him photographs of a few inscriptions of the area and requested him to provide a translation.

In 1873, Rice was appointed to compile gazetteers for Mysore and the neighboring Coorg Province. The gazetteers published in 1876 in three parts ( Mysore in general, Mysore by districts and Coorg ) were much acclaimed earned praise for Rice. A second edition was published in 1897 but excludes the Coorg Volume. Karnataka Government reprinted the volumes in 2004.

In 1879, Rice published about 9,000 inscriptions in Sanskrit, Kannada and Tamil in the book Mysore Inscriptions. In 1882, he published a catalog of all inscriptions found in the princely state.

During his tours as inspector, he came across hundreds of ancient stone inscriptions, language and script of which was very different from the one in vogue. With the help of assistants, he edited, translated, and transliterated thousands of inscriptions. Rice alone is credited with finding nine-thousand inscriptions.

During his tenure, Rice discovered Roman coins in parts of Karnataka, as also some Ashokan edicts. This was an astonishing discovery, and led to the reconstruction of much of India's glorious history. Rice established that an important dynasty which founded the kingdom of Nepal owed its origin to Nanyadeva, who came from the Ganga dynasty of Mysore.

Just before his retirement in 1906, Rice published six volumes of the Biblotheca Carnatica, a collection of major Kannada literary texts.

He died in 1927 in Harrow, London. His grave is at Pinner Road Cemetery, Harrow and reads 'In memory of B. Lewis Rice, C.I.E. for 45 years in the Mysore Service of India as director of public instruction and of archaeological researches. Born Bangalore 17 July 1837. Died. Harrow 10 July 1927 and of Mary Sophia, his wife, daughter of John Garrett. Born Bangalore 21 August. 1845. Died Harrow 10 February 1933.'

== Works ==
- Mysore and Coorg from the inscription. Archibald Constable & Company. 1909.
- Amarakōśa vemba nāmaliṅgānuśāsanavu, Iṅglish Kannaḍa artha mattu padagaḷa paṭṭi sahita. Asian Educational Services. 1927. ISBN 9788120602601.
