= Ajjenahalli =

Ajjenahalli may refer to:

== Places ==
- Ajjenahalli, Alur, a village in Hassan, India
- Ajjenahalli, Belur, a village in Hassan, India
- Ajjenahalli, Sira, a village in Tumkur, India
- Ajjenahalli, Turuvekere, a village in Tumkur, India
- Ajjenahalli, Koratagere, a village in Tumkur, India
- Ajjenahalli, Chiknayakanhalli, a village in Tumkur, India
