= Nidagatte =

Village in Sira Taluk, Tumkur district

Nidagatte is a village in Sira Taluk of Tumkur district, Karnataka state, India. It is around 35 kilometres (22 mi) from the Taluk headquarters Sira. It has a population of around 1,500. The official language of this village is Kannada.

== Transport ==
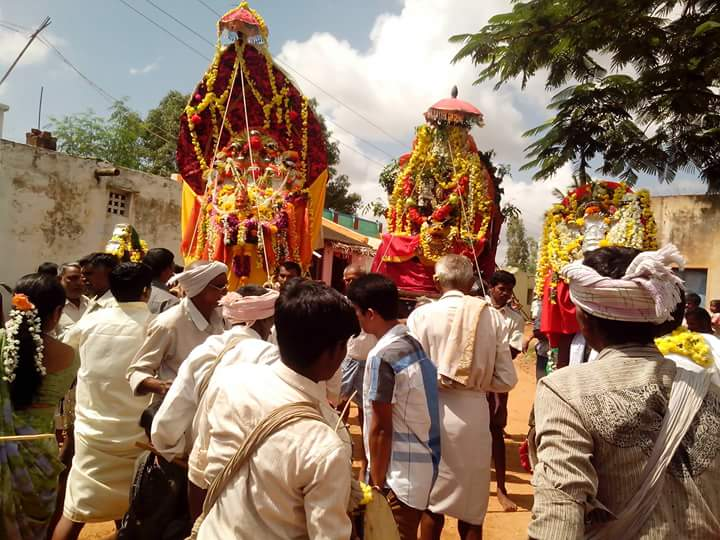

Large number of Private buses and Limited KSRTC buses are available from Sira to Nidagatte. Currently there is no rail connectivity to Nidagatte.

== Main crops ==
Main crops of this village are Ragi (ರಾಗಿ), Groundnut, Silk, Pomegranate, Red Chilly, Cotton, ಜೋಳ, ತೊಗರಿ, other vegetables etc... Economical crops are Pomegranate, Groundnut, Silk.

There is a free water supply for some hectares of lands which are located around the lake. Few farmers have their own borewell for their lands, and some lands are dependent mainly on rain.

== Temples ==
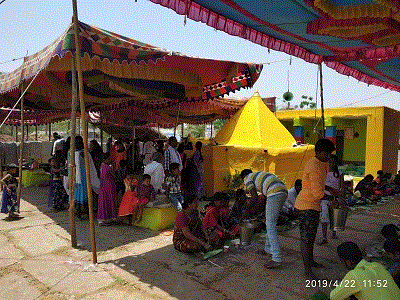
Hari seve at Pathalingeshwara Temple

Mainly there are four temples are in Nidagatte: Sree Pathalingeshwara Swamy temple, Sree Marammadevi temple,

Sree Mylaralingeswara Swamy temple, and Sree Bheeralingeswara Swamy temple.

Sadguru Dyamanna swami Devalaya.

== Education ==
- Government Higher Primary School, Nidagatte (From 1st standard to 7th Standard)
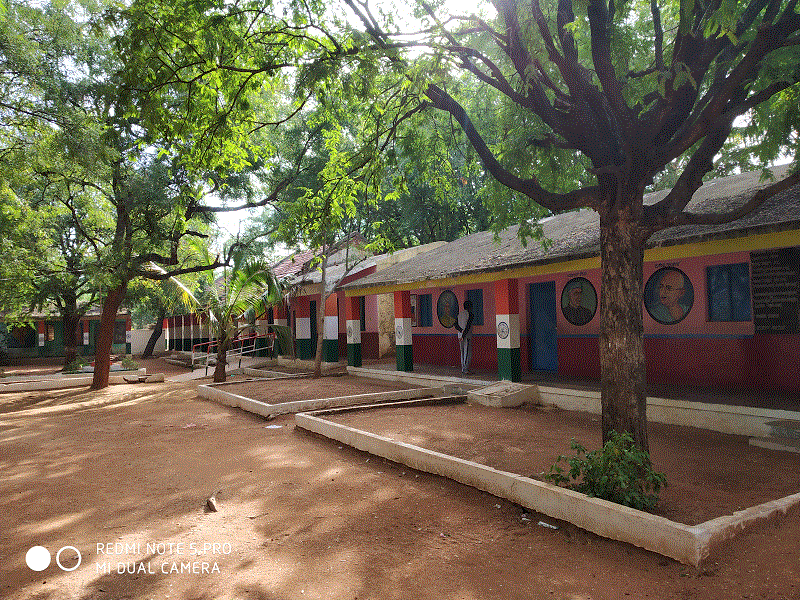

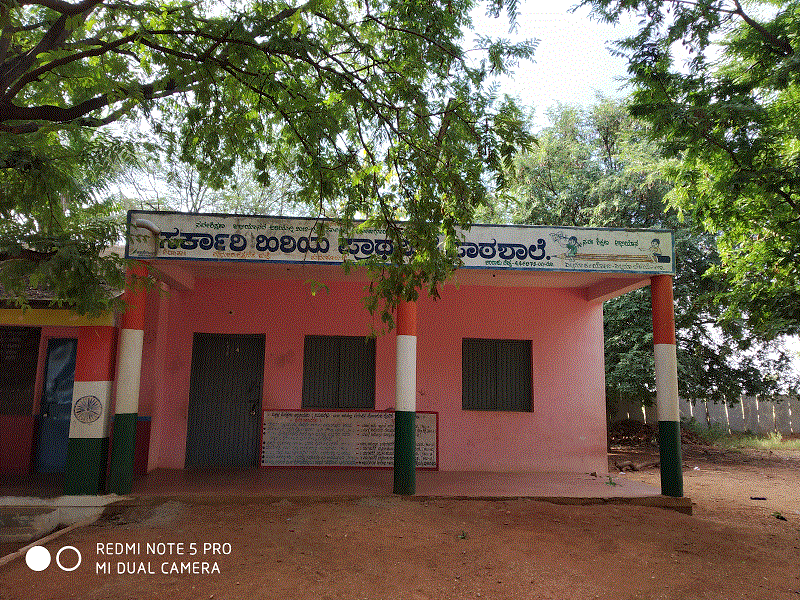

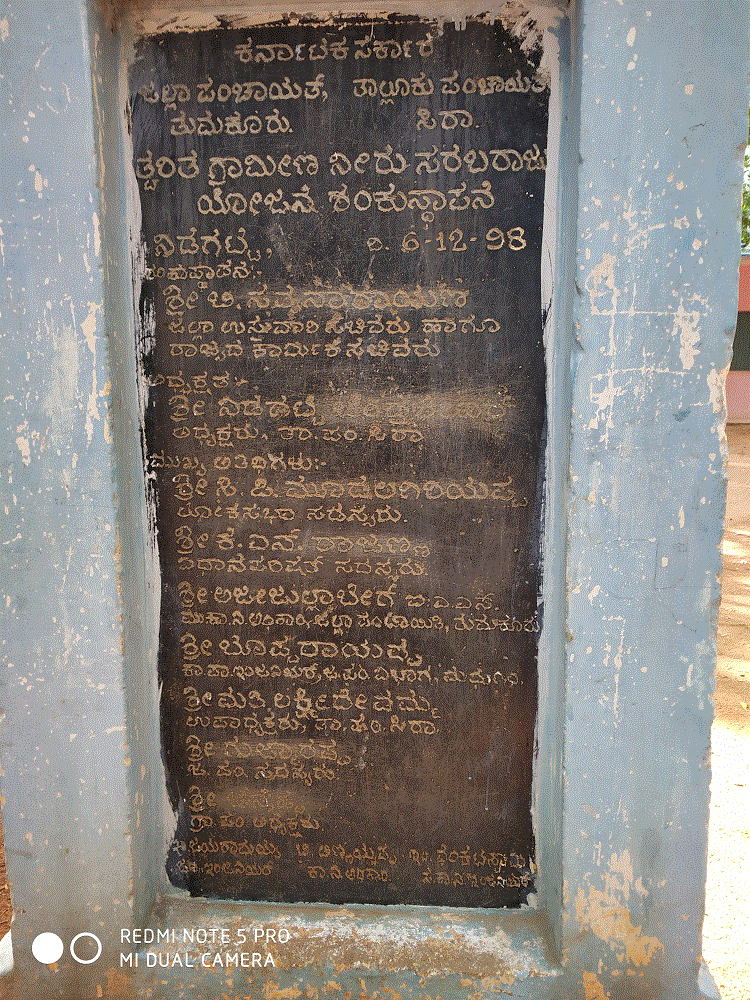

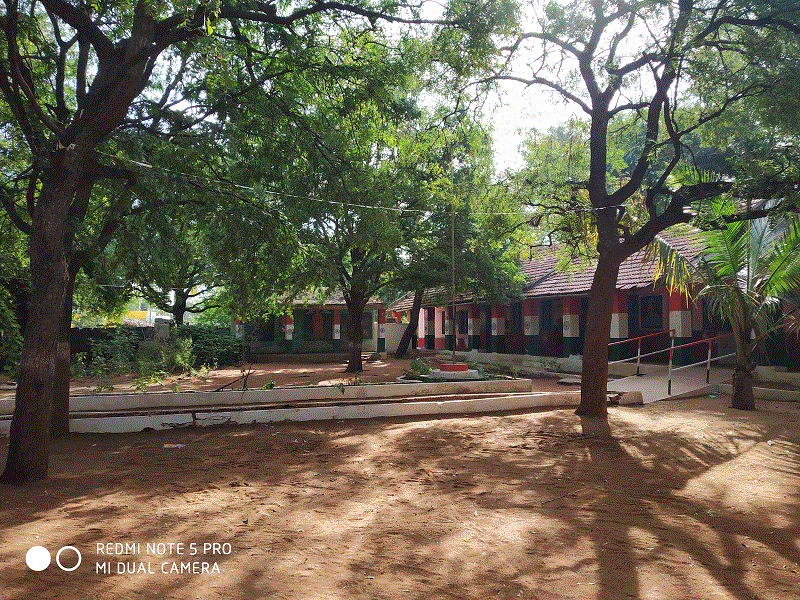
- Anganavaadi Kendra, Nidagatte
- RHS Hulikunte (8th Std to 10th Std), 2 kilometres (1.2 mi) from Nidagatte
- W.H.H Lokapal PU college, Hulikunte (HEBA(History, Economics, Business studies, Accountancy) and HEPS, 2 kilometres (1.2 mi) from Nidagatte

For Other courses such as PCMB, B.com, B.Sc., ITI, Diploma, need to go to headquarter Sira.
