= Kunchitiga =

Indian ethnic group

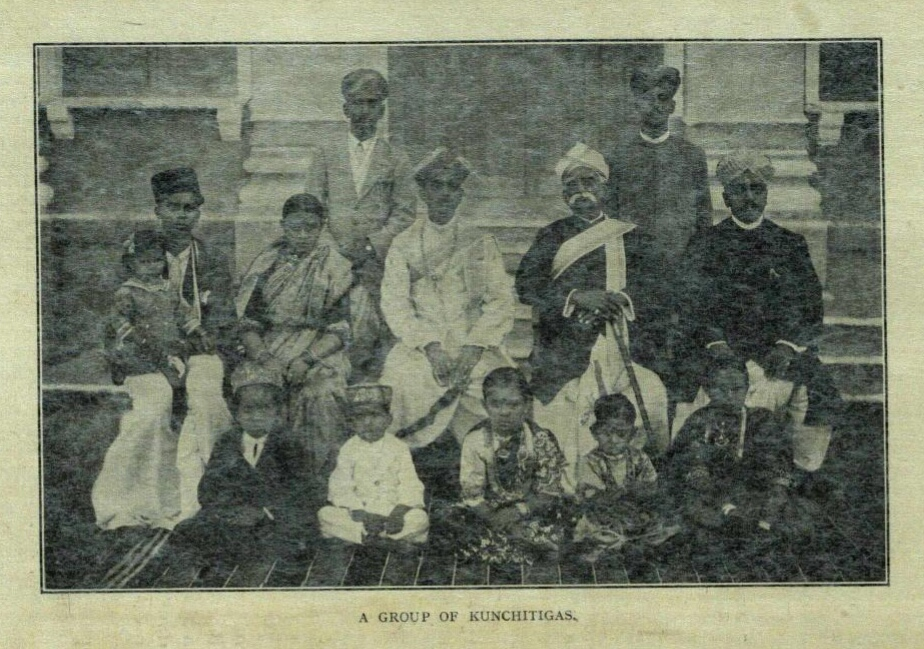
- Kunchitigas

Regions with significant populations
- Karnataka India

Languages
- Kannada, and Sanskrit

Religion
- Vaishnavism, Shaivism

Related ethnic groups
- Dravidian · Kannadiga

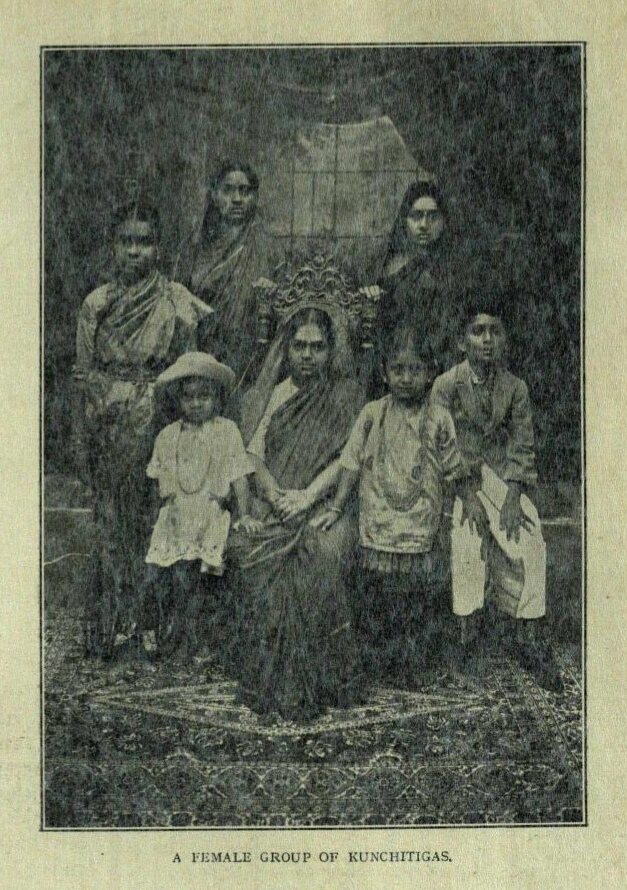
A group of Kunchitiga women and children

The Kunchitigas (also known as Kunchatiga, Kanchitiga, Kanchitigar, Kunchitigar, Kunchidigar, Kunchigar, Kunchu Okkaliga, Kunju Okkaliga, Kurichigar, Kunchiliyan, Kappiliyan) are a community of people from Karnataka, India. They are mostly concentrated in the Tumkur, Bangalore, Shivamogga and Chitradurga districts. They are also found in Andhra Pradesh.

While the Kunchitigas are considered a sub-division of Vokkaligas, they are listed separately by the government. Some Kunchitigas were Veerashaivas who embraced Lingayatism to become a separate division. The Kunchitigas are classified under the General/Unreserved Category by the Central Government of India.

The Kunchitigas were historically a landholding community of cultivators and merchants. They formed part of the administrative and warrior classes in ancient times. Their chiefs were called "Gowda" and "Nayaka" in Karnataka, and "Gounder"

== Etymology ==
The origin of the word Kunchitiga is uncertain, and there are two speculative theories about it. The first is that the word kunchiti is a combination of two words: kuncha (referring to the brush-like crest on a soldier's helmet) and iti (spear), describing soldiers with spears.

The other is that a Kuruba, Jaldhi Bapparaya, held a kuncha, a brush used by Kuruba weavers. Unde Yattaraya is said to have named his community Kunchitiga in his honour.

== Origin, legends, and history ==
While the exact origins of the community are disputed to date, there are legends describing the migration of the community from the north to the south of India.

=== Jaladhi Bapparaya ===
It is believed that the Kunchitigas were originally from North India (Haryana) and were forced to migrate south due to various circumstances in that region. In most legends concerning this migration a Muslim ruler is involved, who is said to have coveted the chief's daughter, Unde Yattaraya. While fleeing the Muslim ruler, she was unable to cross an overflowing river (some accounts say Godavari, others say Tungabhadra) and was helped by a Kuruba Gowda called Jaldhi Bapparaya, who was one of the two divine foundlings (the other being Avinakamaraya). Jaldhi is said to have offered himself as a sacrifice to the river goddess to create an easy passage for the fleeing people. Unde Yattaraya is said to have given her daughter to marry Jaldhi Bapparaya's corpse, who was then revived by divine grace. Unde Yattaraya, Jaldi Bapparaya, and Avinakamaraya are ranked among the progenitors of the Kunchitigas. After crossing the river, the Kunchitigas settled in Vijaynagar first, before moving further south to Nandana Hosur in Chitradurga District, where they migrated to Sira, which is still considered to be their headquarters.

==== Historical significance ====
There seems to be evidence to link the Kunchitigas with the Seuna dynasty. The Seunas known as Yadavas of Devagiri often proudly claimed their pastoral ancestry. It is believed the Vokkaligas had pastoral origins. The legend of Jaldhi Bapparaya has a clear theme of being chased south by Muslim invaders. The arrival of the Kunchitigas at Nandana Hosur matches with Alauddin Khalji's raid on Devagiri. Alauddin Khalji sent Malik Kafur to recapture Devagiri in 1313; Singhana III was killed in the ensuing battle and Khalji's army occupied Devagiri. Seunas were once the feudatories of the Rashtrakutas who were dispatched to rule the northern regions and later became feudatories of the Western Chalukyas. Further epigraphic evidence suggests that the Seuna dynasty likely emerged from a Kannada-speaking background.Many Seuna rulers had Kannada names and titles such as Dhadiyappa, Bhillama, Rajugi, Vadugi, Vasugi, and Kaliya Ballala. Kunchitigas could be Yadavas that migrated south with the fall of their dynasty.

According to Edgar Thurston, the Vokkaligas claimed to be descendants of the Ballāl Rājah of Ānēgundi. The Hoysalas or Ballāl Rājas were contemporaries of the Seūnas of Devagiri.

An alternate version of the history of Kunchitigas and the traditions of Unde Yattaraya is recorded in the Nandana Hosur Copper Plate, but its reliability is doubted.

=== Veera Keturaya and Mahasati Devi Veera Nagamma ===
A legend follows Veera Keturaya, his son Veera Nagappa, and daughter-in-law Veera Nagamma. Keturaya is described as a divine ruler born in Warangal that rose to power after the fall of the Kakatiya empire. He is said to have moved south to fulfill his legacy of killing an evil demon king. In his adventure, he meets the 48 clans of the Kunchitigas coming from Dwarka and becomes their leader. Veera Keturaya moves to Vaddagere with the Kunchitigas, conquers Nelamangala by killing the demon king Baicha, and becomes the king of Penukonda. He is succeeded by Nagappa.

Nagappa's unexpected death at the hands of enemy forces brings Nagamma‘a youthful marriage to an end. She is disappointed in Shiva for failing to protect her husband and ends her life by performing sati. Shiva, displeased with the turn of events, revives her. The Kunchitigas worship Mahasati Devi Veera Nagamma as Shiva's daughter, who through her pure and sincere devotion was able to overcome death.

==== Historical significance ====
Keturaya is said to have ruled a part of the Warangal's Kakatiya kingdom in the 12th century, which is approximated by archaeological evidence like a copper inscription. He was a contemporary of Penukonda's ruler Jagaraya or Jaga Devaraya. The Penukonda rulers dominated parts of South India roughly during and after the fall of Kakatiya dynasty of Warangal, and much before the rise of the Vijayanagara Empire. After ruling Warangal for 12 years, Keturaya settles down in Varapura, Tumkur.

The poet Kempananjaiah praises Keturaya in his yakshagana plays.

The story of Veera Nagamma in Vaddagere, Tumkur, and the movement of the Kunchitigas from the north to south form the basis that Kunchitigas were Yadavas who moved towards Karnataka.

=== History ===
Some believe Kunchitigas were Chalukya or Rashtrakuta warriors. Historian S. C. Nandinath proposed that the word Chalukya originated from Salki or Chalki, which is a Kannada word for an agricultural implement. Some of the Rashtrakuta inscriptions found in the Banavasimandala carry the depiction of a plough at the top, the symbol of the Vokkaliga. There is a view that the Rashtrakutas were originally prosperous cultivators, who later dominated the political scene. Some of the inscriptions refer to them as Kutumbinah, which is interpreted to mean "cultivators". This theory is supported with evidence from Kunchitiga settlements and migration patterns, which resemble a mobile army's method of setting up outposts in their conquests.

As a community of warriors and cultivators, they were historically associated with the Vijaynagar Empire and the Wodeyars of Mysore, among other rulers. Kunchitigas were the rulers of Sira, Madhugiri, and Koratagere.

Kunchitigas are also found in interior parts of Andhra Pradesh Some of the Polygars in the Madurai district were Kunchitigas, locally known as Kappiliya Gounders. Wodeyars frequently battled Madurai Nayakars and had briefly won Dindigal and Theni after Chanda Sahib ended the Madurai Nayak dynasty. Some Kunchitigas are believed to have received land grants. They are also associated with the expansion of the Dindigal fort.

== Subdivisions ==
It is believed that Kunchitigas originally had 101 gotras. Currently, people of the following 48 gotras are found in the Karnataka region. The archaeological department found a stone inscription in Nandana-hosuru, Chitradurga District, with information about the 48 gotras. Endogamous marriages within the same gotra are forbidden.

According to various inscriptions that were found on the copper plates and palm leaves in South Indian archives, the 48 gotras were named after their characters and physiques. Among them, Avinavaru, Baduvanavaru, Basalenavaru, Emmenavaru, Dasalenavaru, Danyadavaru, Undenavaru, Jaldhinavaru, and Janakallinavaru married girls of Shri Krishna Kula Nagakanni sect of Yadavas, and the rest of them were married to the offspring of these couples during pre-Vedic periods.

1. Undenavaru	Humorous ones, descendants of Unde Yattaraya
2. Yelenavaru	Powerful, Anjaneya Bhaktas
3. Janakallinavaru	Caretakers
4. Arasanavaru	Guru, judge
5. Jaldhinavaru	Jailors, descendants of Jaldhi Bapparaya
6. Rageoru	Crazy ones
7. Avinavaru	Traditional, descendants of Avinakamaraya
8. Jannakkoru	Wardens
9. Alunavaru	Philanthropists
10. Danyathavaru	Elegant people
11. Eradukkariouru	Absent minded ones
12. Kankalanavaru	Zealous ones
13. Alenavaru	Sober ones/Teetotallers
14. Surenavaru	clan guru/Advisor
15. Basalenavaru	Traders
16. Emmenavaru	Diplomats
17. Ethirukaraioru	Moral, straightforward
18. Huliyaru	Humane ones
19. Settenavaru	Decision makers
20. Goniyoru	Rigid people
21. Alpenavaru	Aloof ones
22. Bellenavaru	Aggressive ones
23. Andenavaru	Good anchors, Traders and Wise ones
24. Jeerikkoru	Jealous ones
25. Kattaratavaru	Ardent ones
26. Onamanavaru	Powerful people
27. Kakkiyavaru	Enthusiastic ones
28. Manasanvaru	Recited Hymns
29. Kambalioru	Juvenile natured
30. Ellaioru	Elite people
31. Mayoru	Confused ones
32. Athenavaru	Commanders
33. Karikkenavaru	Youthful ones
34. Sarangathoru	Wise people
35. Ravuththnaoru	Chatterboxes
36. Uthathoru	Toolmakers
37. Gudiyoru	Guard, Guest
38. Jeriyoru	Entertainers
39. Uthathoru	Toolmakers
40. Badavanavaru	Singers
41. Dasalenavaru	Tailors
42. Ullenavaru	Autocrats
43. Thabakkioru	Weavers
44. Saradenavaru	Intelligent ones
45. Thomkuthioru	Meticulous ones
46. Kokkenavaru	Knowledgeable ones
47. Kuloru	Traditional people
48. Koopaenavaru	Ones with decorated eyes
49. Olakkaloru	Celebrities
50. Aranmaneyaru or Dasarivaru	Zamindars

The following gotras are found outside Karnataka.

- Kallakanteyavaru
- Jakkeladavaru
- Thandadavaru
- Koddagerenavaru
- Saakuvalleru
- Kodehalliyavaru
- Kottagereyavaru
- Huttenavaru
- Kalledavaru
- Nimbenavaru
- Devanavaru
- Hallakattanavaru
- Uravinevaru (Uravinoru)

The Kunchitigas of Malenadu were cattle traders that were known as maroru (transl. "vendors").
