= Zainab-un-Nissa Begum =

Begum of Bengal

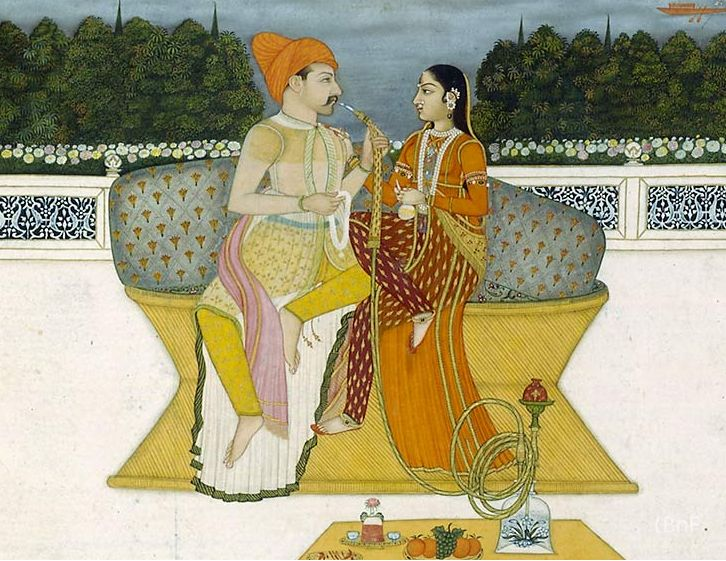
- Zainab-un-Nissa seated alongside Shuja-ud-Din at a terrace, c.1760
- Born: Murshidabad, Bengal
- Died: Murshidabad, Bengal
- Spouse: Shuja-ud-Din Muhammad Khan
- Issue: Sarfaraz Khan
- Dynasty: Nasiri
- Father: Murshid Quli Khan
- Mother: Nasiri Banu Begum
- Religion: Shia Islam

Zainab-un-Nissa Begum, also known as Zinat-un-Nissa Begum, was the chief consort of Shuja-ud-Din Muhammad Khan, the second Nawab of Bengal.

== Family ==
Zainab-un-Nissa, also known as Zinat-un-Nissa, was a daughter of Murshid Quli Khan, the first Nawab of Bengal. He had established the Nasiri Dynasty, becoming the independent ruler of Bengal. Her mother was one of his consorts, Nasiri Banu Begum.

== As Begum ==
When Murshid Quli Khan was holding minor offices in the Deccan for some time, he gave her hand in marriage to Shuja-ud-Din Muhammad Khan, then the most important governor in Burhanpur. The latter then moved to his father in law's household. The two were almost polar opposites; Zainab-un-Nissa was a spirted lady, god fearing and liberal. Meanwhile, Shuja led a licentious lifestyle and was pleasure loving. Thus, they did not get along well and were distant from each other. The incompatibility with her husband eventually led Zainab-un-Nissa to leave and come to Murshidabad where she stayed with her son, Sarfaraz Khan, born to her in 1700.

During this period of time, Murshid Quli Khan had no sons, and thus no heirs. He decided to nominate his grandson Sarfaraz as his successor. Hearing this, Shuja tried to get approval and support from Emperor Muhammad Shah, sending his emmisaries to Delhi to obtain subahdari. When he heard that Murshid Quli was on his deathbed, he rushed back to the palace and proclaimed himself the lawful subahdar of Bengal and Odisha. Sarfaraz, upon hearing this, wanted to contend against his father. But Zainab-un-Nissa dissuaded him by saying:

"Your father is old; after him, the Subahdari as well as the country with its treasure would devolve on you. To fight against one's own father is cause of loss in this world and in the next as well as ignominy. It is prudent that till the lifetime of your father, you should remain contented with the Diwani of Bengal."

She eventually reconciled with her husband when he had expressed his regret in wronging her and Sarfaraz. By resolving the conflict between father and son, she dissipated a crisis that could have caused chaos in Murshidabad with her magnamity and tact. When Bihar was annexed to the subah of Bengal, Shuja had decided to appoint one of his sons there. But she refused to part with Sarfaraz, nor was content with Ali Taqi, her stepson, being appointed. Shuja accepted her decision and it was due to her that Alivardi Khan was appointed as the deputy governor of Bihar.

She was greatly respect and enjoyed pre-eminence during Alivardi Khan's reign due to her high rank and power. She insisted on receiving recognition as the sole heiress of the late Murshid Quli Khan's entire estate and government. By doing this, she consolidated an ally in him, and Shuja presented him with the khillat (gifts) of the Naib Nazim of Patna.

Soon, Alivardi Khan overthrew Sarfaraz Khan. During the battle of Giria, Sarfaraz was struck by an musket ball and died along with his sons. Zainab-un-Nissa was sent a letter by Alivardi Khan, saying how the outcome was written in the books of fate, that he regretted his actions and would never fail to show respect towards her until the last breath of his life.

The governor of Dhaka, Nawazish Muhammad managed to persuade Zainab-un-Nissa to move into his palace and become his adoptive mother. She was entrusted with absolute control and ruled his household, carrying orders without reference to Nawazish.
