= Madalur =

- village
- Location in Karnataka, India Madalur (India)
- Coordinates: 13.816577°N 76.965553°E
- Country: India
- State: Karnataka
- District: Tumkur
- Talukas: Sira

Population (2001)
  - Total: 6,193

Languages
  - Official: Kannada
- Time zone: UTC+5:30 (IST)

Madalur is a village in the south-western state of Karnataka, India. It is located in the Sira taluk of Tumkur district in Karnataka.

== Demographics ==
As of 2001 India census, Madalur had a population of 6193 with 3174 males and 3019 females.

== See also ==
- Tumkur
- Districts of Karnataka
