= Shuja-ud-Din Muhammad Khan =

Nawab of Bengal from 1727 to 1739

- Mīrzā; Motamul ul-Mulk (Guardian of the country); Shuja ud-Daula (Hero of the state); Asad Jang (Lion in War)
- Portrait from the late 18th century

Nawab of Bengal, Bihar and Orissa
- Reign: 1 July 1727 – 26 August 1739
- Predecessor: Murshid Quli Khan
- Successor: Sarfaraz Khan
- Born: c. 1670; Burhanpur, Deccan Plateau, Mughal Empire
- Died: 26 August 1739 (aged 68–69); Murshidabad, Bengal, Mughal Empire
- Burial: Murshidabad, West Bengal, India
- Spouse: Zainab un-nisa Begum (m. 1686) Azmat un-nisa Begum Sahiba (m. 1712) Durdana Begum Sahiba (m. 1718)
- Issue: Mirza Asadullah Khan, Mirza Muhammad Taqi Khan Bahadur, Nafissa Begum Sahiba, Durdana Begum Sahiba
Names
- Mirza Shuja ud-din Muhammad Khan (Mirza Deccani)
- Dynasty: Nasiri
- Father: Nawab Jan Muhammad Khan (Mirza Nur ud-din Muhammad)
- Religion: Shia Islam

Shuja-ud-Din Muhammad Khan (c. 1670 – 26 August 1739) was the second Nawab of Bengal from 1727 until his death in 1739. He married Zainab un-nisa Begum and Azmat un-nisa Begum, the daughters of Murshid Quli Khan by Nasiri Banu Begum. Shuja-ud-Din's third wife was Durdana Begum Sahiba. After the death of his father-in-law on 30 June 1727, he ascended to the Masnad (throne) of the Nawab.

== Early life ==
Born at Burhanpur, Deccan, Mirza Shuja ud-din Muhammad Khan (also called Mirza Deccani), was a Deccani Muslim of Iranian-Turkmen Afshar descent. His ancestor Yar Ali Sultan had been the Safavid governor of Farah, Khorasan during the reign of Tahmasp I. Shuja's father Mirza Nur-ud-din, son of Nawab Aqil Khan, had held a prominent post in Burhanpur under the Mughals and he himself had been given charge of Ilkandal, a dependency of Hyderabad. It was in Burhanpur that Shuja first came into contact with Murshid Quli Khan, who also originated from the city. He married the latter's daughter Zinat un-nisa and had a son, Sarfaraz Khan.

== Rise to power ==
Shuja ud-Din succeeded Tanib Ali Khan as the faujdar of Sylhet in 1719 for a year. He was known to have granted a sanad to the Mufti family during his term, before being succeeded by Shukrullah Khan. In absence of a direct heir, Nawab Murshid Quli Khan nominated his grandson Sarfaraz Khan to the masnad (throne) of Bengal. Murshid Quli Khan died in 1727 and Sarfaraz Khan was to ascend to the masnad.

Then, Shuja ud-din was the Subahdar of Odisha with Alivardi Khan as his Naib (Deputy). Murshid Quli was not generally pleased of the inclusive and people friendly policies of Shuja ud-Din. Accordingly, when Sarfaraz Khan was announced heir, Shuja ud-Din was disturbed at the idea of being in the employment of his son. Alivardi Khan and his brother Haji Ahmed convinced Shuja ud-Din that he himself was more suitable for this position. With support from Alivardi and Haji he made preparations for a take over. He received support from Mughal Emperor, Muhammad Shah in Delhi, who was ready to help him. Shuja ud-Din marched at the head of a large army towards Murshidabad, the capital of the Nawabs of Bengal. To avoid a conflict in the family, the dowager Begum of Murshid Quli Khan intervened; and her son-in-law Shuja-ud-Din ascended to the Masnad of Bengal after Sarfaraz Kahn abdicated in favour of his father. By August 1727, Shuja-ud-Din was firmly established and recognised as the second Nawab of Bengal.

As a sign of gratitude for supporting him, he sent a large amount of money from his revenue collection to the Mughal Emperor Muhammad Shah and in return the Mughals recognised him as Motamul ul-Mulk (Guardian of the country), Shuja ud-Daula (Hero of the state) and Asad Jang (Lion in War), establishing diplomatic ties. He also received the personal Mansab of a Haft Hazari, with seven thousand troopers, besides a fringed Palki, together with the insignia of the Mahi Order, and a Khilat consisting of six pieces of robes, precious stones, a jewel-mounted sword, and a royal elephant with a horse.

== Reign ==
Shuja ud-Din was known to be brave, liberal and generous. The only factor that went against him in terms of having a long rule, was his age.

=== Administration ===
The Siyar-ul-Mutakherin mentions that with regard to private disputes between man and man, he trusted no one; but sending for the parties, he would listen patiently and leisurely to the story of each, and with much judgment drew his conclusion, and pronouncing the decree, caused it to be executed with punctuality. Constantly animated by a scrupulous regard for justice, and always inspired by fear of God, he uprooted from his realm the foundations of oppressions and tyrannies.

Shuja detested the high handed policies of Murshid Quli Khan and had them reversed (in totality) immediately. His detest was so extreme that he went to the extent of auctioning the household goods of Murshid Quli Khan to his arch enemies, the Hindu Zamindars. By this act he raised four million rupees. He had Nazir Ahmad and Murad Farrash, the employees of Murshid Quli Khan, who were notorious for their highhandedness, executed and confiscated their effects. He tore down most of the buildings constructed by Murshid Quli and had newer and bigger constructions done in their place. He allowed the growth and prosperity of his subordinates who respected and gave him fullest loyal services in return. Unlike Murshid Quli, he was not feared and never extracted loyalty but rather commanded the same.

=== Re-alignment of administrative districts ===
In 1733, he merged Bihar Subah with Bengal and divided the merged territory into four administrative divisions, and made the following changes in the administrative positions:

1. Elder son, Sarfaraz Khan: Nazim (Dewan) of the Subah of Bengal
2. Younger son, Muhammad Taqi: Naib (Deputy) Subahdar of Odisha
3. Younger son-in-law, Mirza Lutfullah: Naib (Deputy) Nazim of Dacca
4. Haji Ahmed (brother of Alivardi Khan): Chief Counsellor
5. Nawazish Muhammad Khan: Mir Bakshi (Paymaster General)
6. Syed Ahmed Khan: Faujdar of Rangpur
7. Zain ud-Deen Ahmed Khan: Faujdar of Rajmahal (Akbar Nagar)
8. Pir Khan: Faujdar of Hooghly

By the end of his reign major re-alignments in positions had to be effected. They were very important in context of the times to come.

1. Alivardi Khan: Naib Subahdar of Azimabad (Patna)
2. Elder son, Sarfaraz Khan: Naib (Deputy) Subahdar of Dacca
3. Younger son-in-law, Mirza Lutfullah: Naib (Deputy) Subahdar of Odisha

=== Revenue relief and settlement ===
==== Re-settlement of deprived Hindu Zamindars ====
The Siyar-ul-Mutakherin also mentions that his equity was no less conspicuous towards the Zamindars and other landholders of Bengal. These persons, under Murshid Quli's administration (see: Murshid Quli Khan), had been mostly kept in confinement, and tormented in such a variety of ways, that it would be a pity to spend paper and ink in describing them. Shuja after having firmly established his government, released such of the Zamindars and other landholders as he found on enquiry free from crime or fraud; as to the others, he ordered them to be all brought into his presence, and to form a circle round his person. This being done, he asked them, how they would behave in future, should he release them. These poor people, who had been for years languishing in dungeons, surprised at this address, burst forth into encomiums on his goodness, and after supplicating heaven to grant him a long and prosperous government, promised that henceforward they would pay the revenue with punctuality, and would prove obedient and dutiful servants. Engagements in their own handwriting, authenticated by the proper formalities, being taken from them, they confirmed them by the most solemn oaths. Shuja now sent for a number of rich dresses for each, according to his respective rank and station, so that there was not one in that assembly who did not receive a suitable present. This ceremony being over they were all released, with injunctions to transmit henceforward the revenue through the house of Jagat Seth, Fateh Chand.

==== Revenue settlement ====
By this stroke of policy, over and above the profits of 'Jagirs' and fees on ware-houses and factories, he easily raised one crore and fifty lakhs (fifteen million) of rupees, which he remitted to the Imperial Treasury through the Banking Agency of Jagat Seth Fatih Chand. By selling off at fancy prices to Zamindars the jaded horses, cattle, and other livestock, as well as damaged carpets and curtains belonging to the private estate of Nawab Murshid Quli Khan, he sent another forty lakhs (four million) of rupees, besides elephants, to Emperor Muhammad Shah. And after the Abstract Balance Sheet of the Annual Accounts was prepared, he remitted to the Imperial Capital the stipulated annual tribute of the Nizamat, besides the Imperial Revenue, according to the established conventions.

=== Prosperity and public welfare ===
Shuja-ud-Din Muhammad Khan, inherited (from Murshid Quli Khan) a treasury which was full. He enhanced it further and spent liberally on public welfare.

He surpassed his predecessors in office in paraphernalia of royalty and armaments, and though his prime of life had passed, he did not scorn life's pleasures. Dismantling the public buildings erected by Murshid Quli Khan, as they seemed too small according to his lofty ideals, he built instead a grand and spacious Palace, an Arsenal, a lofty Gateway, a Revenue Court, a Public Audience-Hall, a Private Office, a Boudoir for Ladies, a Reception-Hall, a Court of Exchequer and a Court of Justice.

He lived in magnificent splendour, and used to ride out in regal state. He was known for attending to the well-being of his Army, and to the happiness of his subjects. On his officers, he lavished largesse amounting to no less than one thousand or five hundred rupees in each case.

Nazir Ahmad (an official of Murshid Quli) had laid the foundation of a mosque with a garden on the banks of the river Bhagirathi. Shuja, after executing him, finished the mosque and garden, and named them after himself. He built palaces, reservoirs, canals and numerous fountains within the garden. Shuja ud-Din visited frequently and held parties in the garden. Each year he also held a state banquet for state officers in the garden.

=== Rise of powerful advisors ===
This period saw the rise of important state officials like: Alivardi Khan who was the Naib Nazim of Azimabad (once annexed to Bengal).Haji Ahmed (brother of Alivardi Khan) who was the Chief Counsellor to the Nizamat. Rai Alam Chand who became Diwan of Bengal (was given the title of Ray-Rayan). Jagat Seth, Fateh Chand became the Banker to the Nawab

Their power came from the fact that the Nawab trusted them and mostly left them unsupervised, concentrating on matters of his please. These aides turned out to be very able, efficient and loyal and executed their responsibilities to the satisfaction of the Nawab. The experience would come in good stead as they would play a very active role in the future of Bengal for the next two to three decades. Shuja trusted and rewarded their loyalty but was wise enough to keep their ambitions under a check through proper balances. He was largely unsuccessful and this his successor Sarfaraz Khan would experience in 1740.

=== First altercation with the British East India Company ===
The new Faujdar of Hooghly, Pir Khan (Shuja Quli Khan), commenced exactions and oppressions. The Port of Hugli from his acts of omission and commission was ruined; and he commenced quarrelling with the European merchants. On the pretext of collecting the customs-duties of the Imperial Customs House, he requisitioned troops from the Emperor, commenced hostility with the English, Dutch, and French, and levied nazars (Note: Nazar (Devanagari: नज़र, Nastaliq: نذر): A kind of obligatory offering, such as key money or tribute. The form nazarana can be used to distinguish nazar 'offering' from the homonymous word nazar (Devanagari: नज़र, Nastaliq: نظر) meaning sight, supervision, or evil eye.) and taxes. It is said that once while unloading from English vessels bales of silk and cotton, and placing these below the fort he unfairly confiscated them. The English troops advancing from Calcutta, arrived near the fort. Pir Khan finding himself an unequal match for them climbed down, when the English troops carried off their goods. The aforesaid Khan; writing to Nawab Shuja ud-Daulah requisitioned troops to attack the English and by cutting off supplies of Qasimbazar and Calcutta, he reduced them to straits. The Chief of the English Factory at Qasimbazar was compelled in consequence to arrange terms of peace, by agreeing to pay three lakhs (three hundred thousand) of rupees as nazar to the Nawab. The Chief of the English Factory in Calcutta, borrowing the nazarana money from the Calcutta bankers, remitted it to Murshidabad.

== Personality ==
Shuja-ud-Din is remembered as the most successful Nawab of Bengal who ushered in a reign of "rare" prosperity in Bengal, in the 18th century. He had the experience and the tact to handle a vast array of circumstances and learned well from Murshid Quli Khan. He was a firm follower of Islam and contributed heavily to the conversion of Bengal to Islam. His family including the previous kings were themselves recent converts Bengalis and Oriyas to Islam. He was known to be shrewd, firm, a well-educated and well-mannered person. He started an era of development in Bengal (in the 18th century). While Murshid Quli hailed from the "Aurangzeb school of thought", Shuja was more of a realist, practical and a mild mannered person.

Siyar-ul-Mutakherin by Mir Gholam Hussein Khan Tabtabai (translated into English by Lieutenant Colonel John Briggs, M.R.A.S., The British East India Company (Madras Army) in May 1831.) notes that the reign of Nawab Shuja-ud-din Muhammad was one of the best (twelve) years of the 18th century for the Subah of Bengal. Well known to be a mild, just, secular and God fearing person Shuja was always interested in learning, jurisprudence and meeting new people who visited Murshidabad from other parts of the world. He was an able administrator and was tactful in dealing with the Mughal Emperor, Nawab of Oudh, Marathas, East India Company, his ambitious Nazims, his own son Sarfaraz Khan and ensured proper checks, balances and controls. He was vastly popular among his subjects as well as with the Mughal Emperor Muhammad Shah.

Shuja never engaged in conflict but managed his resources and manpower well enough to posture, never to attack. He had at his disposal the richest province in the country but had "problems" like Oudh, marauding Marathas and a weak Mughal Emperor. He preferred sending "supplies" to Delhi rather than "armies" to fight for the declining Mughals. He had advised caution while dealing with Nadir Shah and adopted a "hands off" approach on top learning that Nadir had left Persia for Delhi. He however kept on sending a part of his revenue collection to Delhi and unlike the Nawab of Oudh kept away from the court intrigues in the Red Fort. It is ironical that Bengal suffered its worst famines and poverty levels one century later.

== Death and succession ==
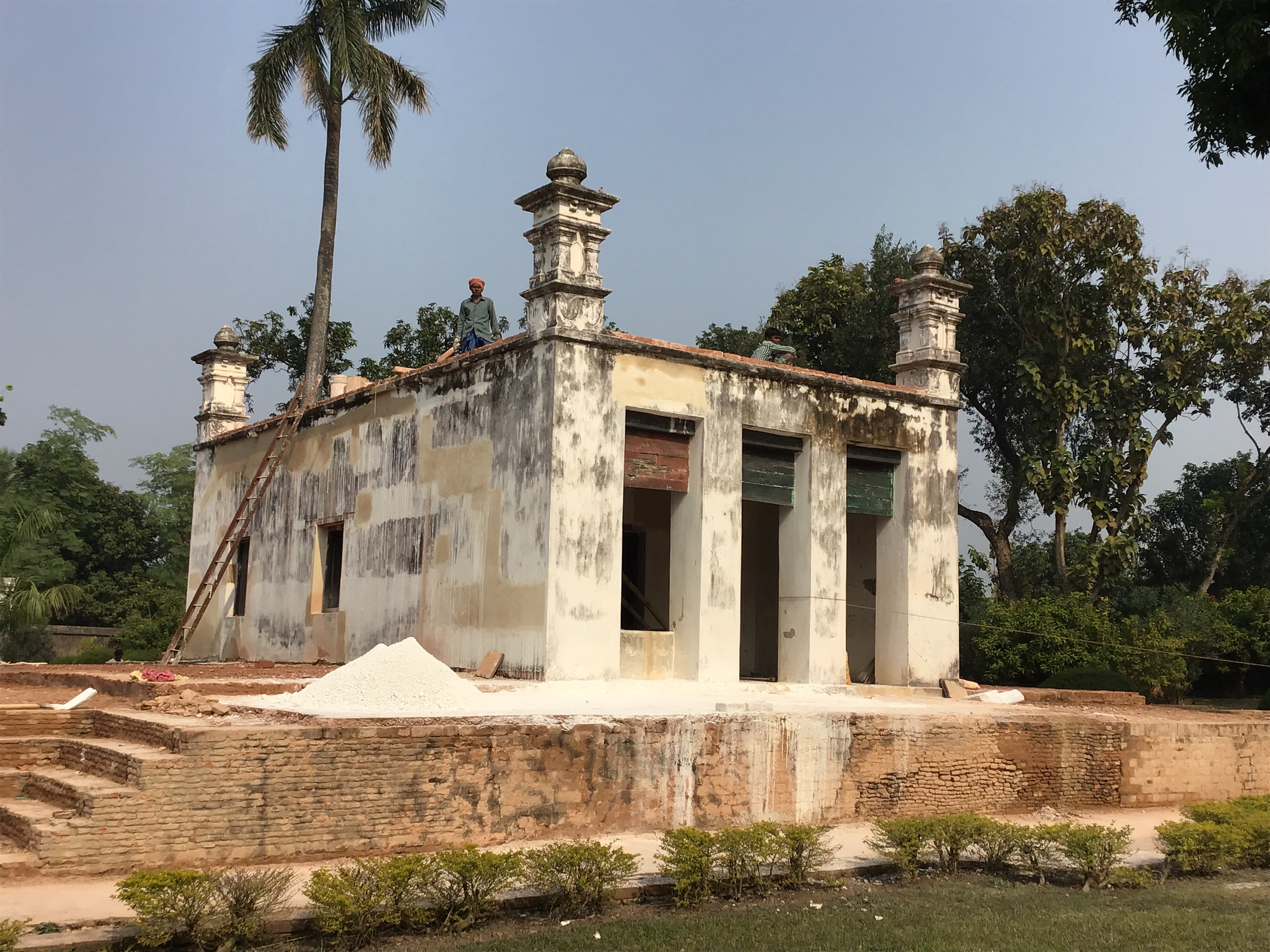
Shuja-ud-Din's masouleum at Roshnibagh

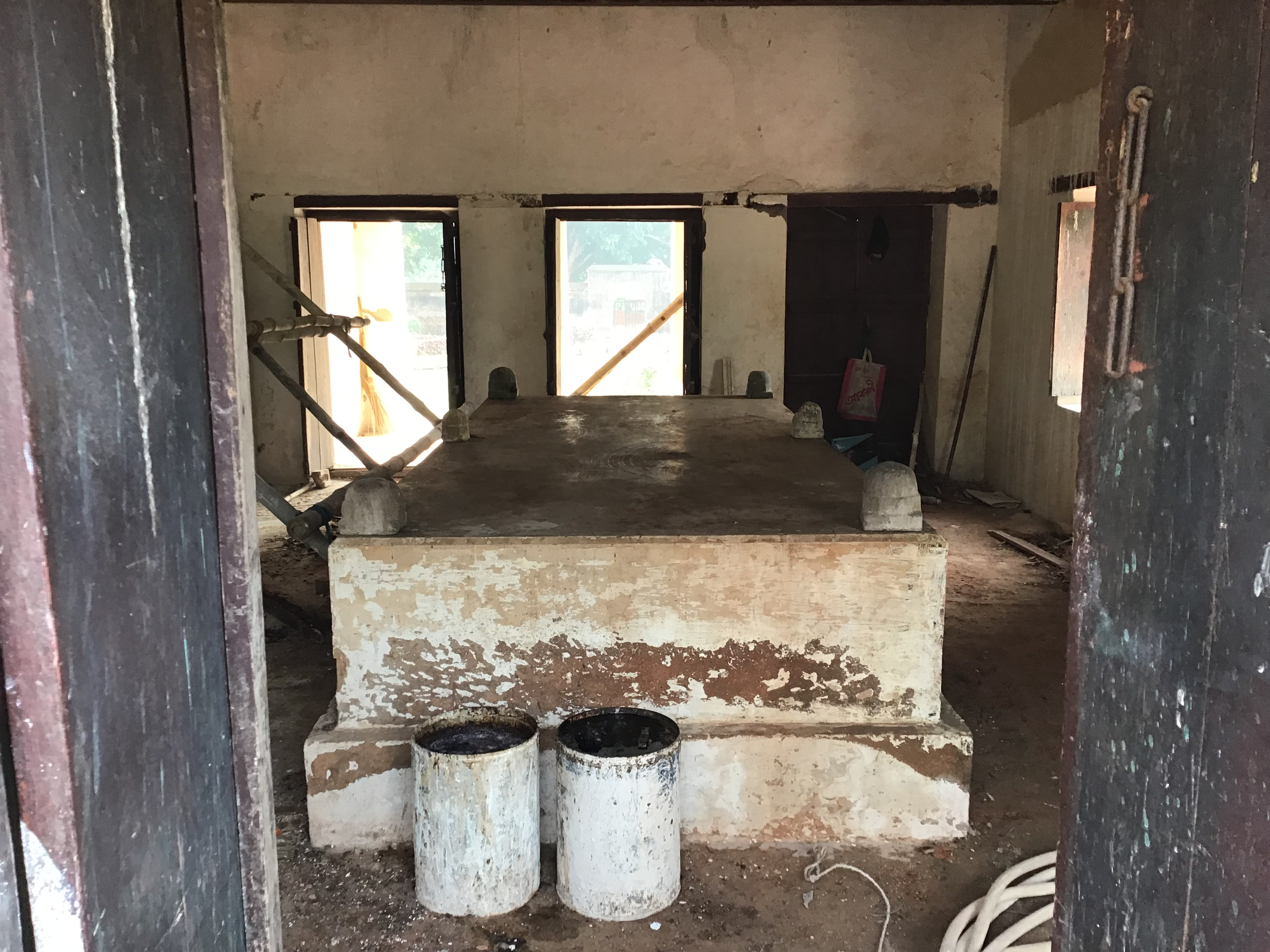
Shuja-ud-Din's tomb

A great perturbation was caused in 1739 by the approach of Nader Shah. Shuja ud-Din fell ill and fearing his death he sent Durdan Begum and his son to Odisha. He also appointed Sarfaraz Khan as his heir and successor. He also enjoined Sarfaraz Khan to regard Haji Ahmed, Alam Chand (Roy Royan Alam Chand) and Jagat Seth as his steadfast counsellor and was to follow their advice in all affairs of moment. But, Sarfaraz Khan had no cordiality towards them and promised to obey Shuja ud-Din's commands, fearing to offend his dying father. Shuja ud-Din died on 26 August 1739 leaving behind two sons and two daughters. He lies buried in Roshnibag in Murshidabad. Shuja ud-Din Muhammad Khan was succeeded by his son, Sarfaraz Khan. His death coincided with the invasion of Delhi by Nader Shah.

In that year, Alivardi Khan (army commander of Sarfaraz Khan) with the help of Jagat Seths and few powerful land magnets deposed and killed Sarfaraz Khan. Alivardi Khan then proclaimed himself as next Nawab of Bengal.

Shuja-ud-Din left behind a very rich and prosperous Bengal to a very average successor, Sarfaraz Khan who had contenders (certainly) better than him. The Nasiri Dynasty lasted for another thirteen months and ended with Sarfaraz Khan.
