= Kadidal =

- village
- Country: India
- State: Karnataka
- District: Shimoga

Government
  - Body: Gram panchayat

Population (2011)
  - Total: 762

Languages
  - Official: Kannada
- Time zone: UTC+5:30 (IST)
- ISO 3166 code: IN-KA
- Vehicle registration: KA
- Website: karnataka.gov.in

Kadidal is a village located in Thirthalli Taluq of the Shivamogga District in India.

The village is dominated by the gowda community. The place was named in memory of a great warrior who won many battles for a king in the past. The place has five main families.
