= Sira Subah =

Subdivision of the Mughal Empire (c. 1687–1766)

Subah of Sira
- Subdivision of Mughal Empire
- 1687 - 1766
- Alam flag of the Mughal Empire

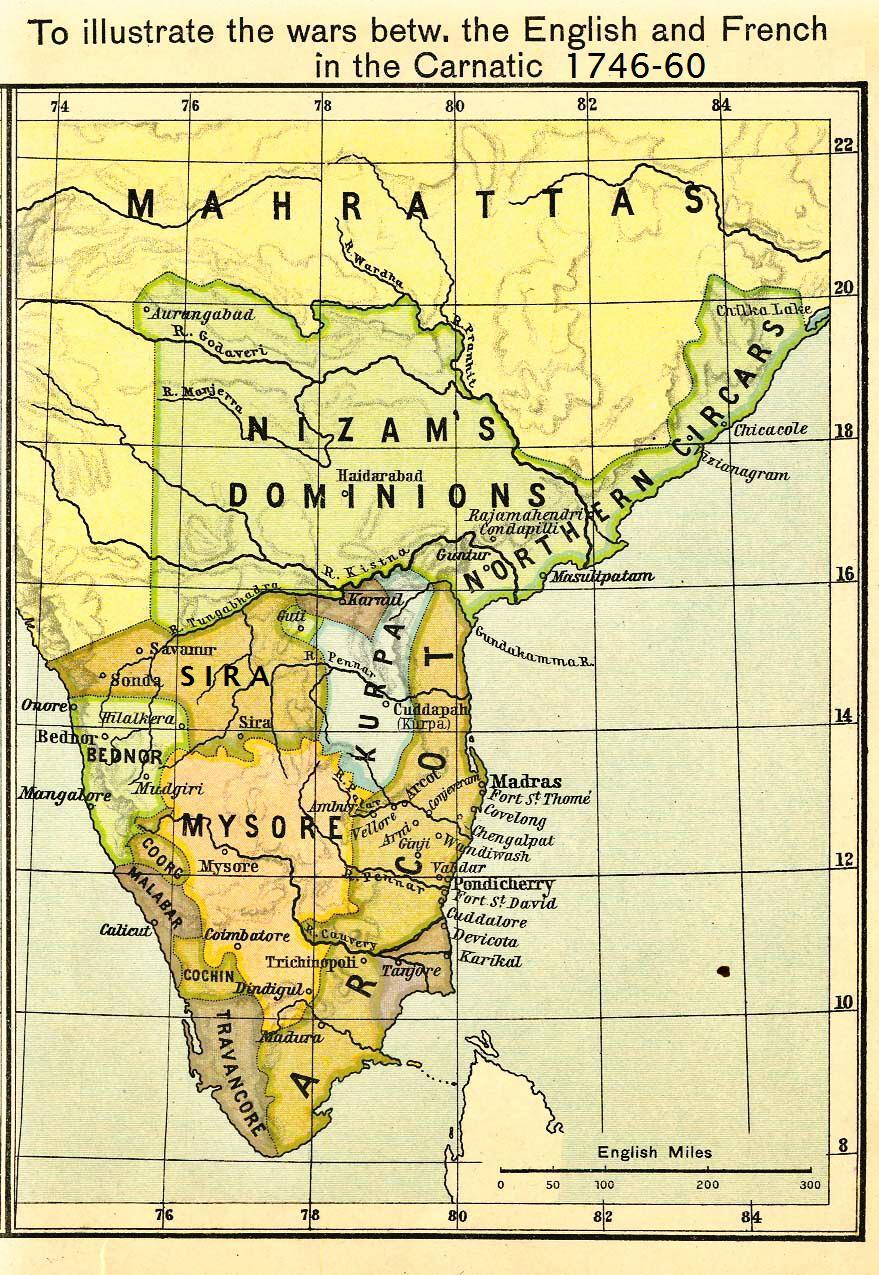
- Mughal province of Sira shown in a map of South India at the time of the Anglo-French Wars in the Carnatic, 1746–1760
- Capital: Sira
- Legislature: Mughal Darbar
- Historical era: Early-modern period
  - Established: 1687
  - Disestablished: 1766
Preceded by	Succeeded by
Bijapur Sultanate	Maratha Confederacy
- Today part of: India

The Subah of Sira (Persian: صوبه سِرا), also known as Carnatic-Balaghat, was a subah (imperial first-level province) of the Mughal Empire in South India that was established in 1687 by conquering emperor Aurangzeb (like Bijapur in 1686 and Golkonda in 1687) and lasted until 1757. The province, which comprised the Carnatic region south of the Tungabhadra River, had its capital in the town of Sira. It was composed of seven parganas (districts): Basavapatna, Budihal, Sira, Penukonda, Dod-Ballapur, Hoskote and Kolar; in addition, Harpanahalli, Kondarpi, Anegundi, Bednur, Chitaldroog and Mysore were considered by the Mughals to be tributary states of the province.

== History ==
After the Mughal armies overran the region of the Mysore Plateau, 12 parganas were annexed to the newly formed province (subah) of Sira. The remaining region was allowed to remain under the rule of the Palaiyakkarars (Polygars), who were required to pay tribute to the provincial government in Sira.

In 1757, Sira was overrun by the Marathas, only to be restored to the Mughals again in 1759. Two years later, Haidar Ali, whose own father had been the Mughal military governor (or Faujdar) of Kolar district in the province, captured Sira, and soon conferred on himself the title of "Nawab of Sira." However, the defection of his brother, a military governor, in 1766 caused the province to be lost again to the Marathas. In 1767, Madhavrao I organized a 2nd expedition against Hyder Ali and inflicted defeats on Hyder Ali in the battles of Sira and Madhugiri and absorbed Sira subah into Maratha confederacy. who retained it until Haidar's son, Tipu Sultan, recaptured the area for his father in 1774.

=== Subahdars (governors) ===
Qasim Khan (also, Khasim Khan or Kasim Khan) was appointed the first Subahdar (governor) of the province in 1686. After successfully "regulating and improving" the province for eight years, he died in 1694 under mysterious circumstances, either during an assault by Maratha raiders, or by his own hand in disgrace after the raiders seized a treasure in his care. Most subahdars who came after him lasted only a year or two, and the frequent changes at the helm continued until the appointment of Dilavar Khan in 1726, whose term, which lasted until 1756, finally brought some stability to the province.

The Subahdars of Sira
Name	Period of tenure	Name	Period of Tenure
Qasim Khan	1686–1694	Ghalib Khan	1713–1714
Atish Khan	1694–1697	Darga Quli Khan	1714–1715
Murad Mansur Khan	1697–1704	Abid Khan	1715–1716
Dliakta Masnur Khan	1704–1706	Mulahavar Khan	1716–1720
Pudail Ulla Khan	1706–1707	Darga Quli Khan	1720–1721
Daud Khan	1707–1709	Abdul Rasul Khan	1721–1722
Sa'adatullah Khan	1709–1711	Tahir Muhammad Khan	1722–1740
Amin Khan	1711–1713	Dilavar Khan	1740–1756

== Administration ==
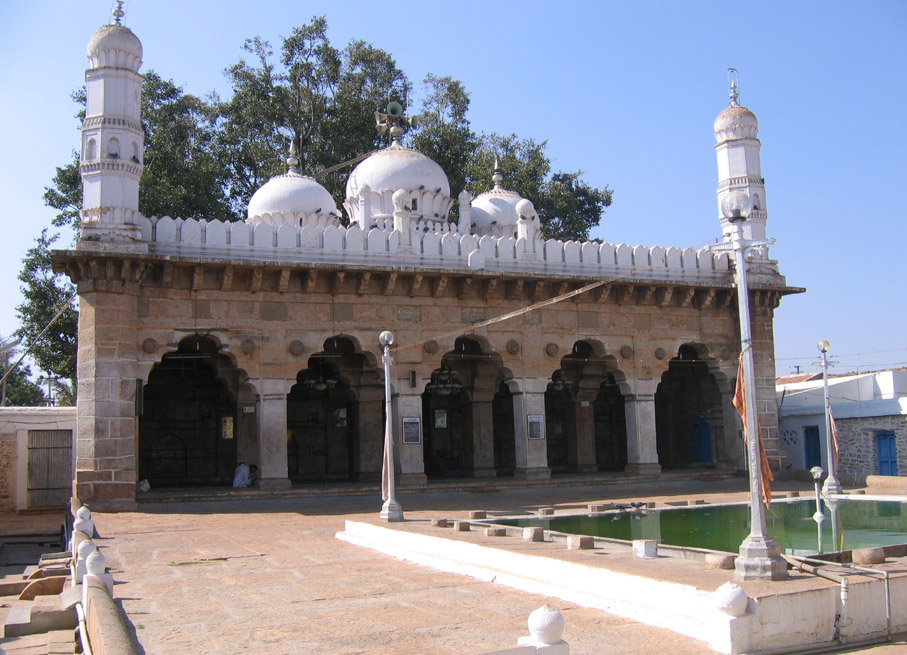
The Mughal-era Juma Masjid in Sira Town, as seen in 2007

In the annexed regions, in which tax assessment on cultivation was under amāni or Sarkār (i.e. provincial government) management, several types of officers collected and managed revenue. Most offices had existed in the region under the previous Bijapur Sultanate administration, and consisted, among others, of Deshmūks, Deshpāndes, Majmūndārs, and Kānungoyas. The Deshmūks "settled accounts" with the village headmen (or patels); the Deshpāndes verified the account-books of the village registrars (or kārnāms); the Kānungoyas entered the official regulations in the village record-books and also explained decrees and regulations to the village governing officers and residents. Lastly, the Majmūndārs prepared the final documents of the "settlement" (i.e. the assessment and payment of tax) and promulgated it.

Until the mid-seventeenth century, both villagers- and district (taluq) accounts had been prepared in the language and script of Kannada, the region's traditional language. However, after the Bijapur invasions, Maratha chieftains came to wield authority in the region and brought in with them various officials who introduced the Marathi language and script into the "public accounts." The new language found its way even into lands ruled by some Palaiyakkarars (Polygars) chiefs. These chieftains had brought in Marathi-speaking horsemen from the northern Bijapur realms for their newly formed cavalry units; consequently, they resorted to hiring Maratha accountants for the benefit of these cavalrymen. After the province of Sira was created, the official language of the Mughal empire, Persian, came to be used.

=== The capital and its monuments ===
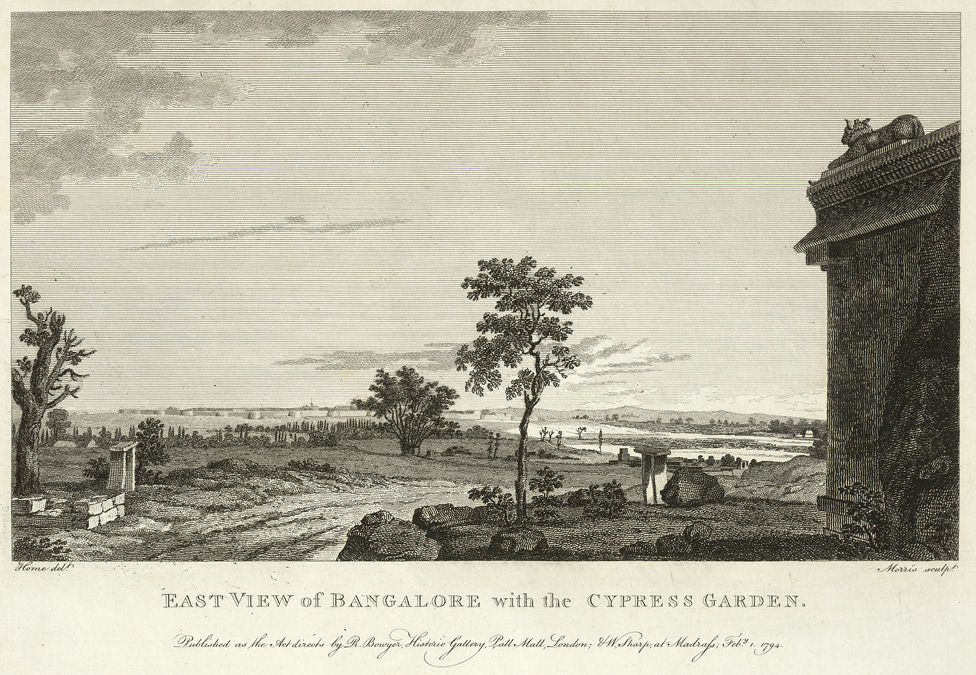
The Lal Bagh gardens in Bangalore, which were commissioned by Haidar Ali and designed after the Khan Bagh gardens in Sira. They are shown here in a 1794 etching.

The capital of the province, Sira town, too, prospered most under Dilavar Khan and expanded in size to accommodate 50,000 homes. Palaces and public monuments of Sira became models for other edifices. Both Haidar Ali's palace in Bangalore and Tipu Sultan's in Seringapatam were modeled after Dilavar Khan's palace in Sira. Moreover, according to the (Imperial Gazetteer of India: Provincial Series 1908), Bangalore's Lal Bagh as well as Bangalore fort may have been designed after Sira's Khan Bagh gardens and Sira fort respectively. Sira's civil servants, however, could not be as readily reproduced: after Tipu Sultan had succeeded his father as Sultan of Mysore in 1782, he deported 12,000 families, mainly of city officials, from Sira to Shahr Ganjam, a new capital he founded on Seringapatam island.

There are Mughal-era buildings that still stand in the town. Among them are the Juma Masjid in Sira.

=== The other towns ===
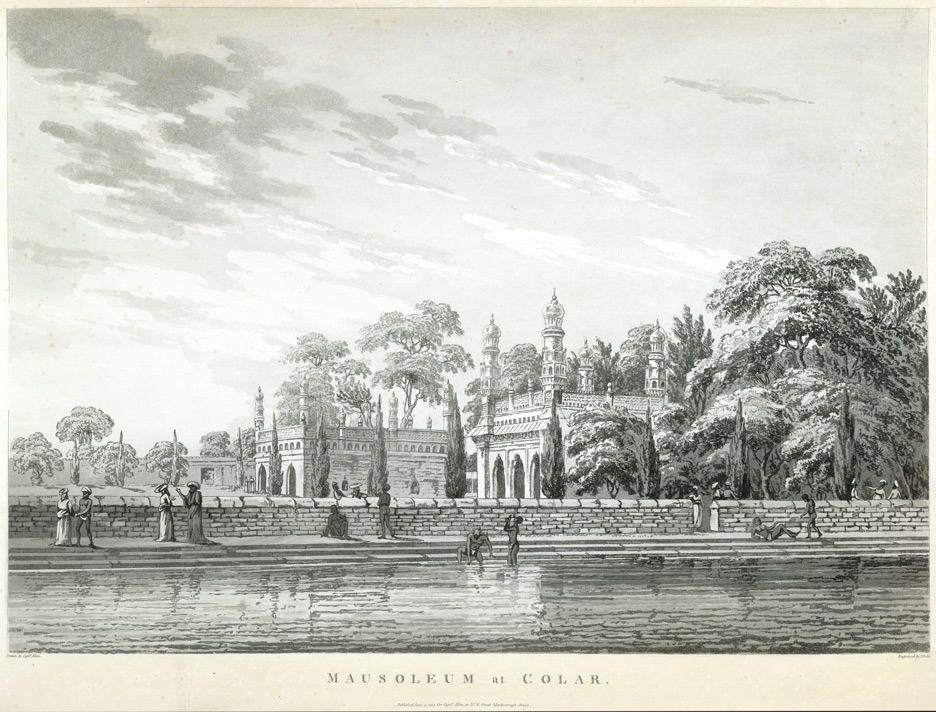
A 1794 aquatint of the mausoleum at Kolar, where Haidar Ali's father, Fateh Muhammad, the military governor (faujdar) of Kolar district, is buried.

Different towns and regions fared differently during the eventful seventy-year history of the province. In Bangalore district, for example, Bangalore town was sold to the Wadiyar Raja of Mysore for Rs. 300,000. The rest of the district was divided in the following fashion: the north was made a part of Chik Ballapur, other parts were added to Sira taluk (district), and the remainder, which included the town of Dod Ballapur, was constituted into a jagir. This was first gifted to a general named A. H. Khuli Khan, who, however, died shortly thereafter. The jagir, which was to yield an annual revenue of 54,000 pagodas, then passed on to his son, Darga Khuli Khan the subahdar of Sira during 1714–1715, who too retained it for a mere year. It was then "attached to the government of Sira" for 49 years until it was seized by the Nizam-ul-Mulk of Hyderabad, and eventually captured by Haidar Ali.

== See also ==
- Sira town
- History of Mysore and Coorg, 1565–1760
- History of Mysore and Coorg, 1761–1799
