= Chandra Arya =

Canadian politician

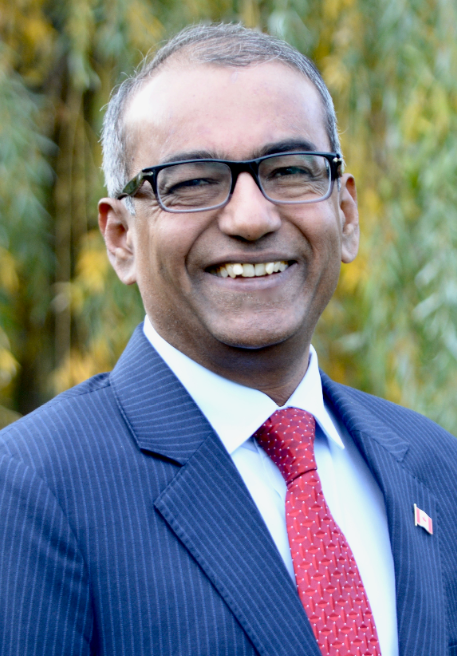
- Arya in 2024

Member of Parliament for Nepean
- In office October 19, 2015 – April 28, 2025
- Preceded by: Constituency reestablished
- Succeeded by: Mark Carney

Personal details
- Born: Chandrakanth Arya; 1963 (age 62–63) Dwaralu, Karnataka, India
- Party: Independent (2025–present)
- Other political affiliations: Liberal (2015–2025)
- Education: Karnatak University (MBA)

Chandrakanth "Chandra" Arya (born 1963) is an Indian-Canadian politician who served as a member of Parliament (MP) representing the riding of Nepean (Ontario) in the Canadian House of Commons from 2015 to 2025. A member of the Liberal Party, he made an unsuccessful bid to become party leader in the 2025 Liberal Party election. He was replaced as MP for Nepean by Prime Minister Mark Carney.

== Education and background ==
Arya is native of Dwaralu village in Sira Taluk, Karnataka, India. He earned his MBA at Kousali Institute of Management Studies, Dharwad, an affiliate of Karnataka University. In 2006, Arya immigrated to Canada. He was the chairman of the Indo-Canada Ottawa Business Chamber prior to entering politics.

== Political career (2015–2025) ==
Arya was elected to represent the riding of Nepean in the House of Commons of Canada in the 2015 federal election and was re-elected in the 2019 and 2021 elections. He served as a member of the Standing Committee on International Trade.

During the 2021 election campaign, Arya was criticized by members of the Ottawa Punjabi Association, who put up anti-Arya signs during the campaign. They accused him of not taking a stronger stance against the Indian government's efforts to reform certain farming practices.

In 2022, Arya became the first member of parliament to speak in Kannada, his mother tongue, in the House of Commons of Canada. Arya blamed "Khalistani extremists" for vandalizing Hindu temples in Toronto.

On April 14, 2023, Arya sponsored petition e-4395, calling on the Liberal government to reconsider setting up a "foreign influence transparency registry." Arya told Global News that he agrees with the concerns expressed by the petitioners. Trudeau, who was asked about the petition, responded by saying he supported the registry but argued to be cautious with the implementation.

After allegations of Indian government involvement in the 2023 assassination of Hardeep Singh Nijjar were made public, Arya said to CBC News that Hindu Canadians were "fearful" of Sikh separatist supporters. When the Toronto Star inquired about his comments, he refused to speak to them by stating that he only does "live interviews" to avoid being misquoted. In summer 2024, Arya travelled to India and met prime minister Narendra Modi. Global Affairs Canada released a statement saying that Arya "travelled to India on his own initiative and was not representing the Government of Canada."

Arya declared his candidacy for the 2025 Liberal Party of Canada leadership election upon the resignation of Prime Minister Justin Trudeau. Arya could not speak French, but did not believe his lack of French matters to French-speaking Canadians. On January 26, 2025, after the party's review committee deemed Arya "manifestly unfit" to lead the party, his candidacy was ruled ineligible by the Liberal Party of Canada, and he was barred from running in the 2025 leadership election.

On March 20, 2025, the Liberal Party revoked his nomination to run under the party banner in the 2025 federal election. Two days later, Prime Minister Mark Carney was announced as the new Liberal candidate for Nepean. In May 2025, Arya said that he believed he was removed for speaking up for Hindu Canadians and against alleged Khalistan movement extremists, but he would not take any further action on the matter.

The Globe and Mail reported that Chandra was ousted due to foreign interference concerns after the Canadian Security Intelligence Service allegedly briefed the government about Arya's allegedly close ties to the Indian government of Narendra Modi and the Indian High Commission in Ottawa. Arya had previously taken a trip to India and met with Modi without informing the Canadian government.

== Post-parliamentary career ==
On May 8, 2025, Arya announced the launch of the Hindu Public Affairs Council of Canada (Canada HPAC) to lobby for Hindu-Canadian interests. Arya told The Globe and Mail that Canada HPAC would be funded by individual donations from Canadians and would not be run as a charity and identified combatting anti-Hindu sentiments and the Khalistan movement as priorities. Arya also said that he believed Indo-Canadian relations could improve under Prime Minister Carney.

== Political positions ==
Arya supports abolition of the monarchy, seeks to lead a "small, more efficient government", and opposes diversity, equity, and inclusion quotas. He proposes taxing expatriate citizens, would remove carbon pricing, and supports recognizing Palestine as a state. Arya would criminalize displays of support for terrorists and “extremism”, seeks to position Canada as an "energy superpower", and argues that Trudeau's immigration policies have caused Canada to rely on "cheap, foreign labour".

=== French language ===
Chandra has argued during his 2025 leadership campaign that fluency in French should not be a prerequisite for leading the country, claiming that French-speaking Canadians prioritize effective governance over linguistic ability. He challenged the traditional expectation of bilingualism in federal politics, asserting that performance and policies matter more than language skills. His stance was widely criticized within the Liberal Party and contributed to his disqualification from the leadership race.

== Controversies ==
=== Ethics inquiry ===
In 2016, political journalist Kady O'Malley reported that Arya faced an ethics inquiry after awarding 26 graduating elementary, middle school, and high school students either an Amazon Kindle e-reader or $500 in cash for showing "perseverance in the face of adversity". Arya defended himself against accusations that he violated the House of Commons conflict of interest code by stating that the Nepean Liberal Riding Association paid for the award.

=== Email scandal ===
In 2021, Arya apologized after a staffer emailed private information of nine hundred constituents to Conservative Party of Canada (CPC) staffers. The CPC told their staffers to delete the email and Arya didn't face any sanctions due to Canadian privacy laws.

=== Rashtriya Swayamsevak Sangh flag ===
In November 2022, Arya's private member's bill, which proclaimed that November was Hindu Heritage Month, passed unanimously. When Arya raised a flag on Parliament Hill to celebrate the event, academics from the Université du Québec à Montréal and groups from the Hindus for Human Rights sent letters to Trudeau arguing that the flag represented Rashtriya Swayamsevak Sangh (RSS), a Hindu nationalist organization. Arya told CBC News that the flag "represented the Hindu faith" and "not support for any political organization". In September 2024, Canadian news website The Breach accused Arya of advocating for causes close to the Hindu far right.

=== Taxpayer gift spending ===
In February 2023, Global News reported that from July 2020 to September 30, 2022, Arya outpaced his house colleagues in "protocol" gifts by purchasing 1,025 plaques for a total worth of $21,931 by using taxpayer funds. Global noted that contracted to a single company SINIX Media Group, who received fifty-three contracts for an amount of $53,681.50 from Arya’s constituency office over the same period. He told the outlet that the plaques were for his constituents but ignored any questions about a working relationship with the firm's chief executive officer.

=== Liberal motion opposition ===
In March 2024, Arya sent an email trying to convince his fellow members of parliament to oppose fellow Liberal caucus member Sukh Dhaliwal's motion-M112, "Political Interference, Violence, or Intimidation on Canadian Soil," stating that it would damage relations with India. Dhaliwal responded to The Hill Times that the motion was meant to protect every Canadian, regardless of background, from all forms of foreign interference. While a few parliamentarians abstained from the vote, the motion passed unanimously.

=== Controversy surrounding Kaali poster ===
In 2022, when filmmaker Leena Manimekalai faced backlash online for a poster of her movie Kaali, which depicted the Hindu goddess Kali smoking and holding a rainbow flag, he condemned the poster on Twitter and linked it to vandalism of Hindu temples. Manimekalai argued that Arya used his position to legitimize threats against her, while over a hundred academics, activists, and community organization members sent a letter criticizing Arya's remarks to prime minister Trudeau.

=== Opposition to 1984 Anti-Sikh riots motion ===
In December 2024, Arya claimed he was the only Liberal Party Member of Parliament to oppose a motion recognizing the 1984 anti-Sikh riots violence in India as genocide. His refusal sparked backlash from Sikh MPs, particularly Sukh Dhaliwal and Jagmeet Singh alongside the wider Sikh community who viewed it as a denial of historical atrocities. Arya later claimed he received threats following his objection and warned that a “Khalistani lobby” might seek to reintroduce the motion.

=== Foreign Interference ===
In March 2025, the Liberal Party of Canada revoked Chandra Arya's nomination to run as their candidate in the Nepean riding for the upcoming federal election, following his earlier disqualification from the party's leadership race in January.

These actions were reportedly linked to concerns over foreign interference, particularly related to Arya's unauthorized trip to India in August 2024, during which he met with Indian Prime Minister Narendra Modi amid heightened tensions between Canada and India. According to The Globe and Mail, party officials were concerned about "troubling inconsistencies" in Arya's responses to a confidential questionnaire. Arya defended his actions, asserting that he had never been required to seek government permission for such engagements. Subsequently, Prime Minister Mark Carney announced his candidacy for the Nepean seat.

== Electoral record ==
2021 Canadian federal election: Nepean
Party	Candidate	Votes	%	±%	Expenditures
Liberal	Chandra Arya	29,620	45.1	-0.8	$109,271.27
Conservative	Matt Triemstra	22,184	33.7	+0.2	$75,325.90
New Democratic	Sean Devine	10,786	16.4	+3.3	$12,498.65
People's	Jay Nera	1,840	2.8	+1.8	$0.00
Green	Gordon Kubanek	1,318	2.0	-4.3	$786.11
Total valid votes/expense limit		65,748	–	–	$121,196.92
Total rejected ballots		419			
Turnout		66,167	70.85		
Eligible voters		93,391			
Source: Elections Canada

2019 Canadian federal election: Nepean
Party	Candidate	Votes	%	±%	Expenditures
Liberal	Chandra Arya	31,933	45.9	-6.52	$107,465.36
Conservative	Brian St. Louis	23,320	33.5	-2.63	$110,373.63
New Democratic	Zaff Ansari	9,104	13.1	+4.90	$3,771.41
Green	Jean-Luc Cooke	4,379	6.3	+3.97	$7,732.54
People's	Azim Hooda	687	1.0		none listed
Communist	Dustan Wang	160	0.2		none listed
Total valid votes/expense limit		69,583	100.0		
Total rejected ballots		407			
Turnout		69,990	75.2		
Eligible voters		93,119			
Liberal hold		Swing		-1.95	
Source: Elections Canada

2015 Canadian federal election
Party	Candidate	Votes	%	±%	Expenditures
Liberal	Chandra Arya	34,017	52.43	+25.32	–
Conservative	Andy Wang	23,442	36.16	-14.86	–
New Democratic	Sean Devine	5,324	8.16	-9.67	–
Green	Jean-Luc Roger Cooke	1,518	2.34	-1.69	–
Independent	Jesus Cosico	416	0.64	–	–
Independent	Hubert Mamba	69	0.11	–	–
Independent	Harry Splett	66	0.1	–	–
Marxist–Leninist	Tony Seed	41	0.06	–	–
Total valid votes/Expense limit		64,888	100.0		$217,170.11
Total rejected ballots		–	–	–	
Turnout		65,150	78.5%	–	
Eligible voters		82,976			
Liberal notional gain from Conservative		Swing		+20.9	
Source: Elections Canada
