= Subah =

Term used for a province in the Mughal Empire

A Subah is a term for a province or state in several South Asian languages. It was introduced by the Mughal Empire to refer to its subdivisions or provinces; and was also adopted by other polities of the Indian subcontinent. It was later adopted by the Maratha Empire, from 1720, as part of many reforms introduction by Shahu I. The word is derived from Arabic and Persian. The governor/ruler of a Subah was known as a subahdar (sometimes also referred to as a "Subeh"), which later became subedar to refer to an officer in the Indian and Pakistani armies. The subahs were established by Padishah (emperor) Akbar during his administrative reforms of the years 1572–1580; initially, they numbered 12, but his conquests expanded the number of subahs to 15 by the end of his reign. Subahs were divided into Sarkars, or districts. Sarkars were further divided into Parganas or Mahals. His successors, most notably Aurangzeb, expanded the number of subahs further through their conquests. As the empire began to dissolve in the early 18th century, many subahs became de facto independent or came under the influence of the regional powers or the suzerainty of the East India Company.

In the modern context, subah (صوبہ) is used in several Pakistani languages (most notably Punjabi, Balochi, and Urdu) to refer to a province of Pakistan.

== History ==
Initially, after the administrative reforms of Akbar, the Mughal Empire was divided into 12 subahs: Kabul, Lahore, Multan, Delhi, Agra, Avadh, Illahabad, Bihar, Bangal, Malwa, Ajmer and Gujarat. After the conquest of Deccan, he created three more subahs there: Berar, Khandesh (initially renamed Dandesh in 1601) and Ahmadnagar (in 1636 renamed as Daulatabad and subsequently as Aurangabad).

Jahangir increased the number of subahs to 17 during his reign; Orissa being carved out of Bangal in 1607. The number of subahs increased to 22 under Shah Jahan. In his 8th regnal year, Shah Jahan separated the sarkar of Telangana from Berar and made it into a separate subah. In 1657, it was merged with Zafarabad Bidar subah. Agra was renamed Akbarabad in 1629 and Delhi became Shahjahanbad in 1648. Kashmir was carved out of Kabul, Thatta (Sindh) out of Multan, and Bidar out of Ahmadnagar. For some time Qandahar was a separate subah under the Mughal Empire but it was lost to Persia in 1648.

Aurangzeb added Bijapur (1686), Sira (1687) and Golkonda (1687) as new subahs. There were 22 subahs during his reign. These were Kabul, Kashmir, Lahore, Multan, Delhi, Agra, Avadh, Illahabad, Bihar, Bangalah, Orissa, Malwa, Ajmer, Gujarat, Berar, Khandesh, Aurangabad, Bidar, Thatta, Bijapur, Sira and Haidarabad (Golkonda). Aurangzeb made Arcot a Mughal subah in 1692.

During the Mughal Empire, the Punjab region consisted of three subahs: Lahore, Multan, and parts of Delhi subah. The Sikh Empire (1799–1849), originating in the Punjab region, also used the term Suba for the provinces it administered under its territorial delineation, of which there were five.

== Current usage ==
In modern usage in Urdu language, the term is used as a word for province, while the word riyasat (Urdu: ریاست, "princely state" in English) is used for (federated) state. The terminologies are based on the administrative structure of British India which was partially derived from the Mughal administrative structure. In modern times, the term subah is mainly used in Pakistan, where its four provinces are called "Subah" in the Urdu language.

== List of Subahs of the Mughal Empire ==
=== Akbar's original twelve subahs ===
The twelve subahs created as a result of the administrative reform by Akbar(Mughal Emperor):

#	Subah	Capital(s)	Captured/Taken	Established	Abolished	Cause of Abolishment
1	Kabul Subah (Kashmir Sarkar added in 1586)	Kabul	October 1504; from Mukim Beg Arghun	1580	26 November 1738	Captured by Nader Shah as a result of the Battle of Khyber Pass
2	Lahore Subah	Lahore	15 January 1524; from Daulat Khan Lodi	1580	15 September 1758	Captured by Ahmad Shah Durrani
3	Multan Subah (Thatta Sarkar added in 1593)	Multan	December 1527; from Shah Beg Arghun	1580	1752	Captured by Ahmad Shah Durrani
4	Ajmer Subah	Ajmer	1556; from Maldeo Rathore	1580	1758	Captured by Jayappaji Rao Scindia and Ram Singh
5	Gujarat Subah	Ahmedabad	20 November 1572; from Muzaffar Shah III	1580	February 1758	Captured by Damaji Rao Gaekwad
6	Delhi Subah (also known as Shahjahanabad Subah)	Delhi	21 April 1526; from Ibrahim Khan Lodi'	1580	21 September 1857	Captured by George Anson
7	Agra Subah	Agra	10 May 1526; from Ibrahim Khan Lodi	1580	12 June 1761	Captured by Suraj Mal
8	Malwa Subah	Ujjain	29 March 1561; from Baz Bahadur	1580	24 December 1737	Captured by Bajirao I and Balaji Baji Rao
9	Awadh Subah	Faizabad, later Lucknow	28 March 1528; from Sheikh Bayazid Farmuli	1580	26 January 1722	Seceded under Saadat Ali Khan I
10	Illahabad Subah	Illahabad	1574	1580	1772	Captured by Tukoji Rao Holkar and Visaji Krushna Biniwale
11	Bihar Subah	Patna	6 August 1574; from Daud Khan Karrani	1580	1733	Seceded under Shuja-ud-Din Muhammad Khan
12	Bengal Subah	Tanda (1574–95) Rajmahal (1595–1610, 1639–59) Dhaka (1610–1639, 1660–1703) Murshidabad (1703–1717)	12 July 1576; from Daud Khan Karrani	1580	1717	Seceded under Murshid Quli Khan

=== Subahs added after 1596 ===
The subahs which added later were (with dates established):

#	Subah	Capital	Year of establishment	Year of disestablishment	Cause of disestablishment	Emperor
13	Berar Subah	Ellichpur	1596	11 October 1724	Seceded under Asaf Jah I	Akbar
14	Khandesh Subah	Burhanpur	17 January 1601	1760	Captured by Balaji Baji Rao	Akbar
15	Ahmadnagar Subah (renamed Daulatabad in 1636) (further renamed Aurangabad)	Ahmadnagar (1601–1636); Daulatabad; Aurangabad	July 1600 (conquest completed in June 1636)	1724	Seceded under Asaf Jah I	Akbar
16	Orissa Subah	Cuttack	1605	March 1717	Seceded under Murshid Quli Khan	Jahangir
17	Thatta Subah	Thatta	1629	1737	Seceded under Noor Mohammad Kalhoro	Shah Jahan
18	Telangana Subah	Nanded	1636	1657	Merged into Bidar Subah	Shah Jahan
19	Qandahar Subah	Qandahar	1638	1648	Captured by Abbas II	Shah Jahan
20	Kashmir Subah	Srinagar	1648	1752	Captured by Ahmad Shah Durrani	Shah Jahan
21	Balkh Subah	Balkh	1646	1647	Captured by Abd al-Aziz Khan	Shah Jahan
22	Badakhshan Subah	Qunduz	1646	1647	Captured by Abd al-Aziz Khan	Shah Jahan
23	Bidar Subah	Bidar	1656	11 October 1724	Seceded under Asaf Jah I	Shah Jahan
24	Bijapur Subah	Bijapur	1684	31 July 1724	Captured by Marathas	Aurangzeb
25	Golkonda Subah (later Hyderabad)	Hyderabad	12 September 1687	31 July 1724	Seceded under Shahu I	Aurangzeb
26	Sira Subah	Sira	1687	1766	Captured by Madhavrao I	Aurangzeb
27	Arcot Subah	Gingee	1692	1710	Seceded under Saadatullah Khan I	Aurangzeb

== List of Subahs of the Maratha Empire ==
The subahs were introduced into the Maratha Empire in 1721 by Chhatrapati Shahu as a part of his administrative reforms. It did continue even after his reign as new territories were conquered by Marathas across the Indian subcontinent. By 1758, there were 30 subahs in Maratha India and 3 subahs were under Peshwa's rule.

#	Subah	Capital(s)	Year of establishment	Year of disestablishment	Cause of disestablishment
1	Hindu Kush Subah	Kabul (1741–1758), Kunduz (1758–1761)	1741	1761	Captured by Durrani Empire
2	Punjab Subah	Attock (1741–1756; 1758–1800), Lahore (1756–1758)	1741	1800	Independence of Sikh Empire
3	Rajput Subah	Multan (1735–1758), Ajmer (1758–1813)	1735	1813	Subsidiarised by the East India Company
4	Delhi Subah (under Mughal influence)	Delhi	1758	1818	Ended with the empire's overthrow
5	Baroda Subah	Baroda	1721	1818	Ended with the empire's overthrow
6	Konkan Subah (Note: Raigad was part of Konkan Subah but was separated in 1721, and was made a separate province)	Raigad (1674–1721), Shahapur (Note: Later renamed as Thane) (1721–1818)	1674	1818	Ended with the empire's overthrow
7	Agra Subah (under Mughal influence)	Agra	1758	1818	Ended with the empire's overthrow
8	Western Bengal Subah	Rajshahi (1742–1751), Murshidabad (1751–1775)	1742	1775	Captured by the East India Company
9	Prayagraj Subah	Allahabad	1749	1803	Captured by the East India Company
10	Peshawar Subah	Peshawar	1743	1761	Captured by the Durrani Empire
11	Thatta Subah (Note: Renamed as Scind)	Thatta	1733	1800	Captured by Kalhoras
12	Bhopal Subah	Bhopal	1737	1792	Independence of Bhopal State
13	Indore Subah	Indore	1732	1818	Ended with the empire's overthrow
14	Bahawalpur Subah	Rahim Yar Khan (1751–1761 (Note: Later ceded to Punjab Subah)), Bahawalpur (1761–1782)	1751	1782	Independence of Bahawalpur State
15	Khandesh Subah	Ahmednagar	1748	1818	Ended with the empire's overthrow
16	Poona Subah (Note: Renamed as Pune) (Note: Peshwa's subah)	Pune	1674	1818	Ended with the empire's overthrow
17	Satara Subah (Note: Peshwa's subah)	Satara	1674	1818	Ended with the empire's overthrow
18	Raigad Subah (Note: Peshwa's subah)	Raigad	1721	1818	Ended with the empire's overthrow
19	Thanjavur Subah	Thanjavur (1674–1680; 1713–1818), Arcot (1680–1682)	1674	1818	Ended with the empire's overthrow
20	Jinji Subah (Note: Jinji Subah, also known as Arcot Subah, was a part of Thanjavur Subah until 1682)	Gingee (1682–1721; 1752–1818), Arcot (Note: Arcot was the capital of the Thanjavur Subah for a short time, before becoming a part of Jinji Subah) (1721–1752)	1682	1818	Ended with the empire's overthrow
21	Ganga Subah (Note: Initially named as Ganga–Jamuni Subah)	Kanpur (1748–1752), Lucknow (1752–1803)	1748	1803	Captured by the East India Company
22	Jamuni Subah	Lucknow (Note: Lucknow was ceded to Ganga Subah in 1752 and Patna became the capital.) (1748–1752), Patna (1751–1803)	1748	1803	Captured by the East India Company
23	Adilabad Subah	Adilabad (1751–1772), Berar (1772–1792)	1751	1792	Ceded to Hyderabad State
24	Karnataka Subah (Note: Initially named as Uttara Kannada Subah)	Belgaum	1750	1803	Captured by the East India Company
25	Khed Subah	Khed	1700	1818	Ended with the empire's overthrow
26	Andhra Subah	Amaravati	1758	1775	Captured by the East India Company
27	Kashmir Subah	Srinagar	1758	1800	Captured by Sikh Empire
29	Cuttack Subah (Note: Cuttack was part of the Western Bengal Subah before being separated in 1752.) (Note: Under Uttar Sarkar)	Cuttack	1752	1803	Captured by the East India Company
30	Sagar Subah (Note: Sagar was a part of Indore Subah before being separated in 1735.)	Sagar (Note: Also called as Saugor)	1735	1818	Ended with the empire's overthrow

== Gallery ==
Subahs of the Mughal Empire

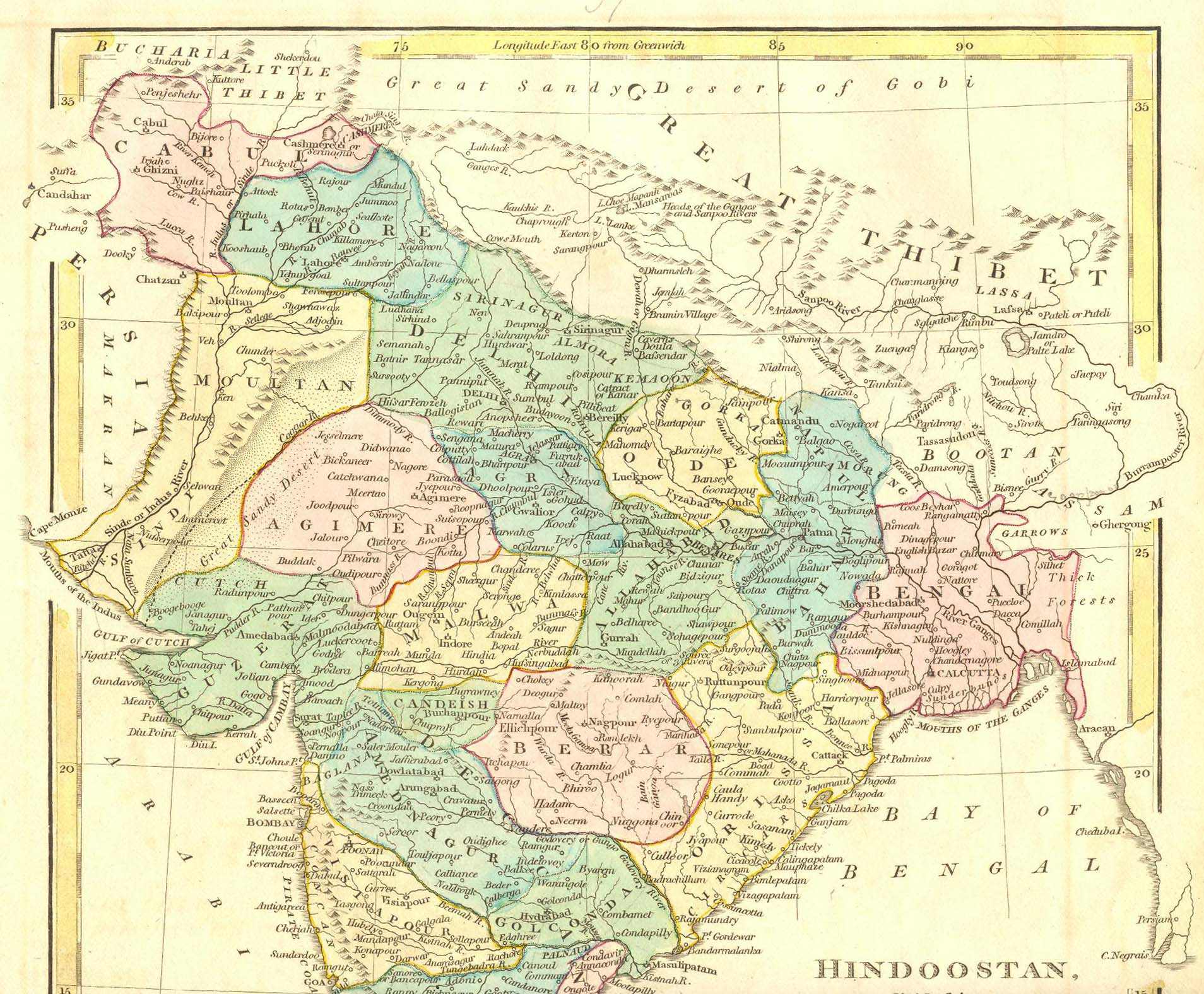
Subahs of the Mughal Empire (North India)

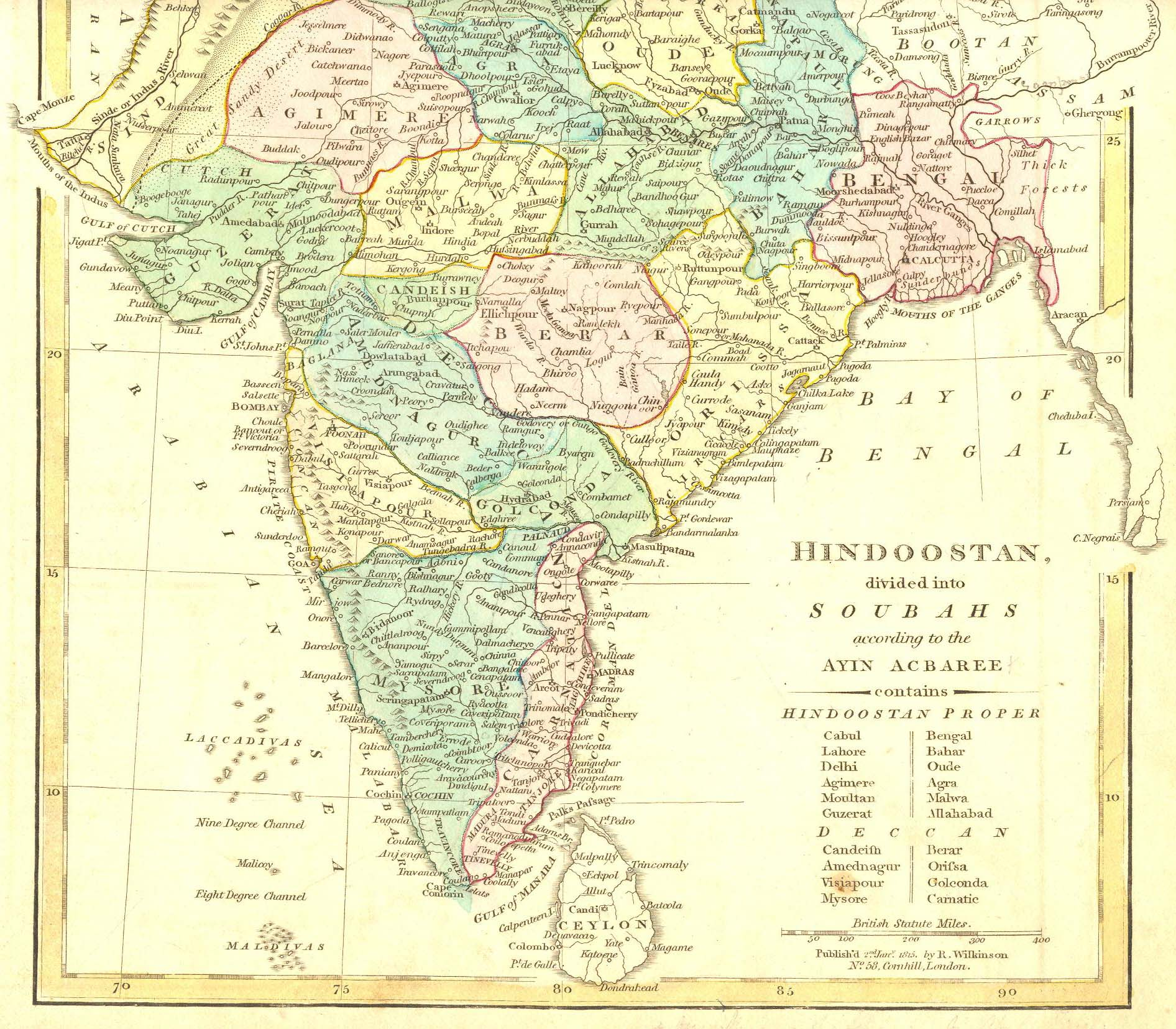
Subahs of the Mughal Empire (South India)

== See also ==
- Administrative divisions of India
- Subah or Taraf, Pargana or Mahal, Mauza or Pir
- Iqta'
