= Hooghly =

Hooghly or Hughli can refer to:

== Places in India ==
- Hooghly River, distributary of the Ganges in India
- Hooghly district, West Bengal
  - Hugli-Chuchura
  - Hooghly railway station
  - Hooghly Lok Sabha constituency

== Ships ==
- Hooghly (1819 ship), a British merchant ship
- Hooghly-class fuel barge, of the Indian Navy
- HMIS Hooghly, an Indian pilot vessel formerly HMCS Waskesiu
