= Ajjenahalli, Sira =

Ajjenahalli
- village
- Ajjenahalli, Sira is in Tumkur district
- Country: India
- State: Karnataka
- District: Tumkur
- Talukas: Sira

Government
  - Body: Village Panchayat

Languages
  - Official: Kannada
- Time zone: UTC+5:30 (IST)
- Nearest city: Tumkur
- Civic agency: Village Panchayat

Ajjenahalli, Sira is a village in the southern state of Karnataka, India. It is located in the Sira taluk of Tumkur district in Karnataka.

== See also ==
- Tumkur
- Districts of Karnataka
