= Vokkaliga =

Group of castes in Karnataka

Okkaligar
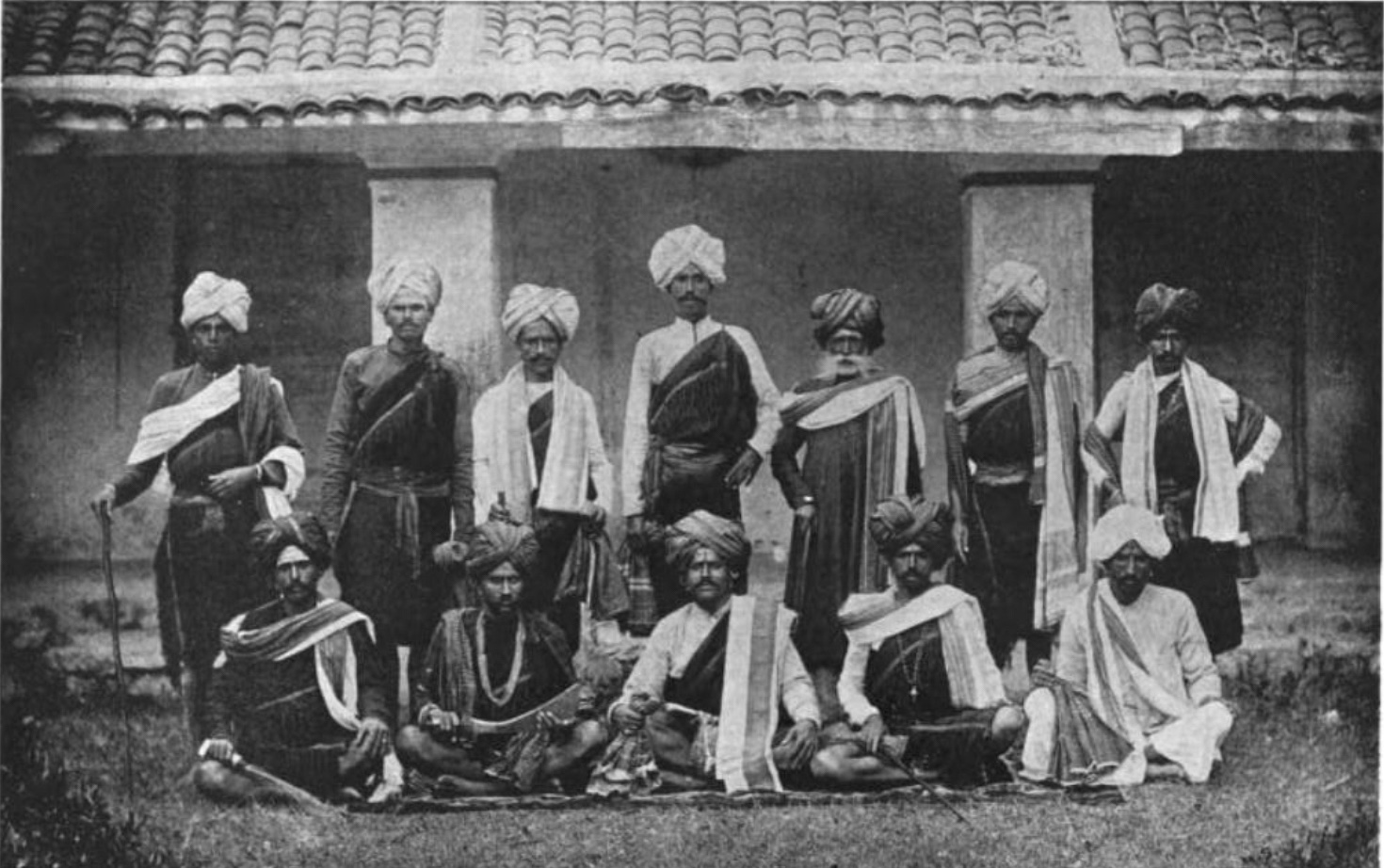
- Hal Vokkaligas (Manjerabad landholders) in 1903

Total population
- 6.168 million

Regions with significant populations

Languages
- Kannada

Religion
- Majority: Hinduism

Related ethnic groups
- Kannadigas

Vokkaliga (IPA: [(w)okːɐliɡɐ], also transliterated as Vokkaligar, Vakkaliga, Wakkaliga, Okkaligar, Okkiliyan) is a community of closely related castes, from the Indian states of Karnataka and Tamil Nadu.

As a community of warriors and cultivators they have historically had notable demographic, political, and economic dominance in Old Mysore (region). It is believed by some historians that the Rashtrakutas and Western Gangas were of Vokkaliga origin. The Vokkaligas occupied administrative positions in the Vijayanagara Empire. They later formed the early rulers of the Nayakas of Keladi. The Vokkaligas had the most families in the ruling classes of the 17th century when the Arasu caste of the Wodeyars was created to exclude them. Under the Kingdom of Mysore they operated autonomously and also served in the army and militia. The Vokkaligas formed the landed-gentry and warrior class of Karnataka.

Most subsects of the Vokkaliga community are designated as Forward castes by the Central Government of India, while some subsects in rural areas are designated as Other Backward Class by the Karnataka Government. Vokkaligas of the Lingayat faith are treated separately.

Vokkaligas commonly carry titles such as Gowda, Hegde and Gounder.

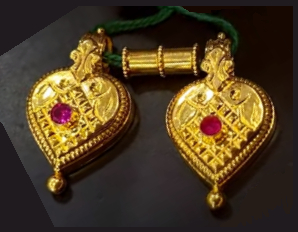
Vokkaliga ornaments

== Etymology ==
=== Vokkaliga ===
Vokkaliga is a Kannada-language word found in some of the earliest available literary works of the language, such as the Kavirajamarga, Vikramarjuna Vijaya, and Mangaraja's Nighantu. Generally, the term has come to mean an agriculturist though various etymological derivations are available:

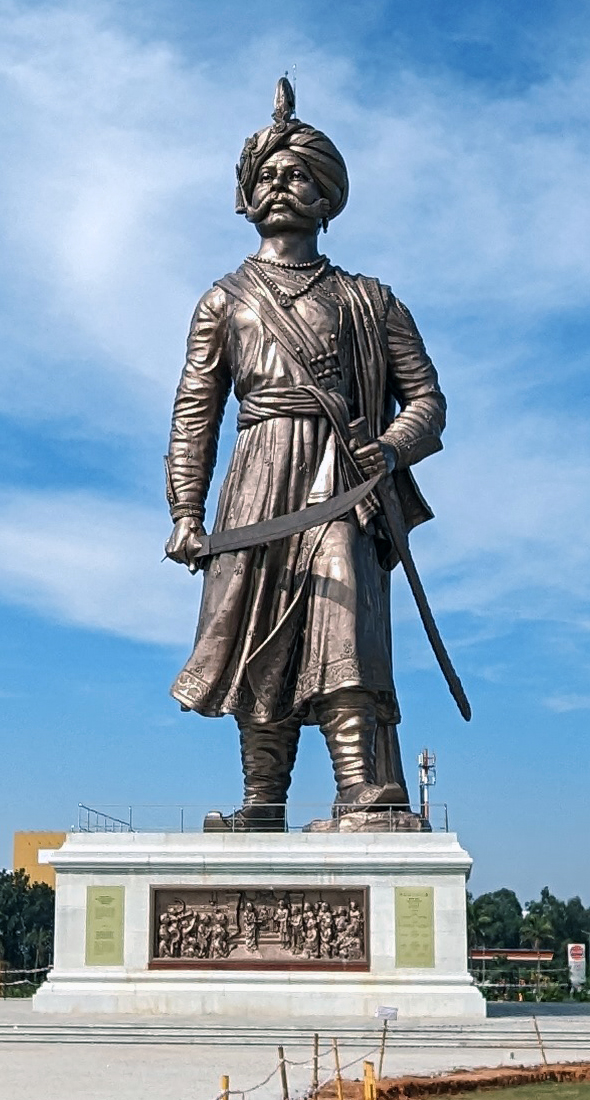
Kempe Gowda I chieftain under the Vijayanagara Empire. The city of Bengaluru was founded by him in 1537.

- The word okka or okkalu is a Kannada word for a family or a clan and an okkaliga is a person belonging to such a family. This is an allusion to the totemistic exogamous clans that together form an endogamous subgroup, of which there are many amongst the Vokkaligas. These clans are called Bali, Bedagu, Kutumba, Gotra or simply Okkalu all of which mean family. They are named after their progenitor, primary occupation or, in most cases, after various birds, animals or objects. Vokkaliga is analogous to Kutumbin in Sanskrit.
- Okkalutana in Kannada means agriculture
- Alternate etymologies include okku, which means "threshing" in Kannada, and Vokkaliga means someone from a family that threshes

=== Gowda ===
According to historian Suryanath U. Kamath, the word Gowda derives from Gavunda. The German Indologist Gustav Oppert opined that the root of ‘Gowda’ is a Dravidian word meaning "mountain".

The term "Gowda" and its archaic forms in Old Kannada such as Gamunda, Gavunda, Gavuda, Gonda, appear frequently in the inscriptions of Karnataka. The Epigraphia Carnatica is replete with references to land grants, donations to temples, hero-stones (Veeragallu), stone edicts and copper plates dating back to the age of the Western Ganga Dynasty (est. 350 CE) and earlier. The Gavundas were landlords that collected taxes and rendered military service to the kings. Noboru Karashima says the Gavundas had functions corresponding to that of the Chola Vellala Nattars. The majority of the gavundas were derived from the Vokkaligas; but by the 10th century, the term gavunda also came to denote chiefship of a community or group and was adopted by the heads of other communities assimilated into the early medieval state.

The Vokkaligas of Tamil Nadu use Gowdar and Gounder as their surname. The Tamil origins to the word Gounder claim its derivation from kavundan or kamindan (one who watches over).

== Subgroups ==
The term Vokkaliga was used to refer to Canarese cultivators. Vokkaliga community has several sub-groups within its fold such as Gangadhikara, Namdhari Vokkaliga, Morasu Vokkaliga, Kunchitiga, Halikkar(Palikkar) Vokkaliga, Reddy Vokkaliga, Gounder, Tulu Gowda. etc. Lingayat converts of the various Vokkaligas are categorised as Lingayats.

Exogamy at the family/clan level is strictly controlled by using the idiom of Mane Devaru (the patron god of the given exogamic clan) which dictates that the followers of same Mane Devaru are siblings and marriage is thus forbidden, allowing marital alliances only with another clan and not within.

=== Gangadikara Vokkaliga ===
The Gangadikara Vokkaligas, also known as the Gangatkars are numerically the largest among the Vokkaliga. The Gangadikaras are mostly found in the Mysore, Mandya, Chamarajnagar, Hassan, Bangalore, Ramanagara and Tumkur districts of Karnataka. Gangawadi was the name for the area covering these districts, ruled over by the Western Ganga Dynasty and Gangadikara is a contraction of the term Gangawadikara (A man of Gangawadi). According to Burton Stein and L. K. Iyer the Ganga rulers were Gangadikara Vokkaliga chiefs. The Gangadikara Gowdas claim to be descendants of the erstwhile Ganga rulers. The administrative setup of Gangas vested power in the Ooru Gauda, Nadu Gauda, Pergade (archaic for Hegde, Pergade->Peggade->Heggade) and so on, at various levels of administration and apart from administrative duties, the Gauda was expected to raise militia when called for.

The Gangadikaras and other Vokkaligas were considered analogous to the Vellalar Chieftains of Tamil Country. They are Deccan Kshatriyas corresponding to Marathas of Maharashtra. The Gangadikaras and the Kongu Vellalars could possibly share a common origin. In fact, the word Konga is the Tamil equivalent for Ganga.

The Gangadikaras have two primary sections – the Bujjanige (or Dhaare Shastradavaru) and the Pettige (or Veelyada Shastradavaru) based on differences in rituals performed during the wedding ceremony. They can be Shaiva or Vaishnava in religious affiliation (called Mullu and Dasa sects). Cheluru Gangadikaras (also called Chelaru), another small sub-sect, are said to be strictly vegetarian, a vestige of the times when the Gangas followed Jainism. Oral traditions of the people maintain that after the decline of the Ganga power they reverted to Hinduism retaining certain Jain practices. The Gangadikara Vokkaligas have as many as 40 kulas, exogamous clans, known in Kannada as Bedagu.

=== Morasu Vokkaliga ===
The border regions of Karnataka around modern-day Bangalore, Tumkur and Hosur was known as Morasu-nadu and was dominated by Morasu Vokkaligas.

The Morasu Vokkaliga have four endogamous groups, namely the Morasu Vokkaligar, the Hosa Devara Vokkaligar, the Bellu Kodu Vokkaligar and the Musugu Vokkaligar. They speak both Kannada and Telugu. Telugu is restricted to the two sections of Reddy and Palyada Sime. The usual caste titles are Gowda for the Kannada section and Reddy for the Telugu section.

Many Palegars belonged to the Musuku group. The Palegars of Devanhalli, Dodballapur, Yelahanka, Magadi, Hoskote, Kolar, Anekal and Koratagere were Morasu Vokkaligas. The famous Kempe Gowda I, the founder of Bangalore City, was the most distinguished of the Palegars of Magadi. The family of Kempe Gowda migrated from Kanchi in the 15th century. The Devanahalli Fort was built by Malla Bhaire Gowda to immortalise Bhaire Gowda, the headman of one of the seven clans that migrated from Kanchi.

Burton Stein noted a link between Morasu Vokkaligas and the Thondaimandala Vellala.

=== Kunchitiga Vokkaliga ===
Kunchitigas are concentrated mostly in Tumkur, Chitradurga, Bangalore and Mysore. They are also found in Salem, Coimbatore and Theni districts of Tamil Nadu. They were traditionally agriculturists and were known for being a successful and enterprising group.

=== Namdhari Vokkaligas ===
The Namdhari Vokkaliga is the oldest and second largest Vokkaliga sub-group and are concentrated in Malenadu. They are also called Malava Gowdas. They use the surnames 'Hegde' and 'Gowda'. The Namdharis were Jains who converted to Vaishnavism along with their Hoysala King Vishnuvardhana and are followers of Sri Ramanujacharya.

The Hoysalas were possibly of Namdhari Vokkaliga origin. Historians refer to the founders of the Hoysala dynasty as natives of Malenadu based on numerous inscriptions calling them Maleparolganda or "Lord of the Male (hills) chiefs" (Malepas). Some historians believe Hoysala originated from Sosevuru (Modern Angadi, Mudigere taluk). Hoysalas also strongly supported Kannada language. The early Hoysala chiefs had alliances with the Western Ganga Dynasty and claimed to be heirs to the Gangas. Several of the major feudatories of the Hoysalas were Vokkaligas. Many Vokkaligas migrated into Tamil Nadu under Hoysala rule.

Some of the Malenadu Vokkaligas took to Lingayatism. The Keladi Nayakas were Malava Gowdas of Veerashaiva faith.

=== Hallikkar Vokkaliga ===
Hallikkar Vokkaligas or Pallikar Vokkaligas are a subsect of Vokkaligas. They were mainly engaged in the rearing of cattle. According to M. N. Srinivas, the Hallikar were related to the Gollas and Kurubas. The namesake is the best in the far-famed Amrit Mahal cattle.

They are also called Servegars as they were chief herdsmen in the Amrit Mahal Department. They use Gowda and Nayak as surnames.

=== Tulu and Kodagu Vokkaliga ===
Tulu and Arebhase Gowda (Gauda) are the subsect of the Vokkaliga community located primarily in the South Canara District, Kodagu District, Indian state of Karnataka and Bandadka village of Kasaragod, Kerala State. They are said to have 10 Kutumba and 18 Bari as their primordial root families, from which a Nūru Mane or "hundred families" arose.

=== Nonaba Vokkaliga ===
They were residents of the ancient Kingdom of Nonambavadi which was ruled by the Pallavas up till 10th century A.D. The Pallavas also called themselves as Nonambadhi Raja, Nonamba Pallava, Pallavadhi Raja, etc. This section of the Vokkaligas are Lingayats by faith. In most respects, they follow the same customs as the Gangadhikara Vokkaligas.

=== Sadars ===
They are Vokkaligas found chiefly in the Shimoga and Chitradurga Districts. They were originally Jains, though many converted to the Lingayat, called Sadar Lingayats and Hindu faiths. The Hindus worship both Siva and Vishnu, while the Jains worship the Jain Tirthankaras and Hindu Gods as well. The non-Lingayats, are divided into Huvvinavaru ("Those of flowers") and Hongeyavaru ("Those of the Honge Mara"). Sadars had a high social status due to their strict vegetarianism and total abstinence. They have the usual Kattemane form of caste organization. The use the caste title Gowda.

== Varna classification ==
The varna system of Brahmanic ritual ranking never really took hold in South Indian society. The two intermediate dvija varnas—the Kshatriyas and Vaishyas—did not exist.

James Manor said that

"Varnas – the four large traditional divisions of Hindu society, which exclude Dalits – have less importance in South India than elsewhere because there are no indigenous Kshatriyas and Vaisyas in the South"

There were essentially three classes: Brahmin, non-Brahmin and Dalit. Vokkaligas were considered non-Brahmin upper-castes.

Quoting Gail Omvedt

"In addition the three way ' caste division (Brahman, non - Brahman, Untouchable) seems particularly prominent here. There are no recognized 'Ksatriya' jatis anywhere in the south, and the three states (in contrast to the more inequalitarian hierarchies of Tamil Nadu and Kerala) are characterized by the dominance of large peasant jatis with landholding rights who historically supplied many of the zamindars and rulers but remained classed as 'Shudra' in the varna scheme."

Therefore Vokkaligas along with other ruling castes like Bunts and Nairs were classified as "Upper shudra"/"Sat shudra" during the British Raj. This ritual status was not accepted by the Vokkaligas and was misleading as historically, dominant land-holding castes like the Vokkaligas, Vellalars and Reddys belonged to the ruling classes and were analogous to the Kshatriyas of the Brahmanical society.

"In the 17th Century, Chikkadevaraja created the Urs caste and classified it into 31 clans. Of these, 13 clans were deemed superior, while the remaining 18 were placed lower in the hierarchy. This latter comprised ruling families in the domain he was rapidly expanding. The most populous caste in this region, the Gowdas (the caste name Vokkaliga was later affixed to it during the British Census), clearly had more families in the ruling classes."

== Economy ==
Before the 20th century Vokkaligas were the landed gentry and agricultural caste of Karnataka. Despite the community enjoying the status of chieftains and zamindars, there were also a lot of small landholding farmers. They, along with the Lingayats, owned most of the cultivated land in the state. Therefore they were considered forward castes and dominant-majority communities. In 1961, Karnataka passed a new Land Reforms Act under the then Revenue minister and idealist Kadidal Manjappa (a Vokkaliga). This was followed by another Land Reform Act passed in 1973 by Ex-Chief Minister Devaraj Urs. These acts redistributed land from the Vokkaliga landlords to the landless and land-poor.

== See also ==
- Kannada people
- Adichunchanagiri Hills
