= Sira Taluk =

Sira Taluk Sira
- City and Taluk
- Location in Karnataka, India
- Coordinates: 13.745°N 76.909°E
- Country: India
- State: Karnataka
- District: Tumakuru

Population (2024)
  - Total: 420,436

Languages
  - Official: Kannada
- Time zone: UTC+5:30 (IST)
- PIN: 572 137
- Vehicle registration: KA-06, 64.

Sira is a taluk of Tumkur district in the state of Karnataka, India. Its headquarters, Sira city lies on the NH 48 (earlier NH 4). It is the largest taluk in the district by area, and second largest in population and economy. It is the most developed region in the district after the headquarters.

== History ==
Sira was politically and militarily an important region of south India prior to the British Raj. Sira Province was ruled by the Bijapur Kings from 1638 to 1687. The "Suba" or Province of Sira of the Mughal Empire with its capital at Sira town lasted from 1687 to 1757. The Marathas wrested the province from Mughals and held it from 1757 to 1759, when the Mughals regained it. In 1761, Haidar Ali whose father Sheikh Fateh Mohammed occupied an important position in the local Mughal Army declared his independence from the Mughal Empire and declared himself the 'Nawab' of the province. He called himself 'Nawab Haider Ali Bahadur' but lost the province to the Marathas from 1766 until 1774 when his son Tipu Sultan, captured it for him.

== Notable people ==
- Chandra Arya, a Canadian Liberal Party politician, is from Dwaralu village in Sira Taluk.

== See also ==
- Province of Sira
- Sira, India
- Tumkur
- Tumkur District
- Taluks of Karnataka

== Bibliography ==
- List showing protected monuments Archaeological Survey of India, Bangalore circle, (For Sira, see Sl. No: 198 & 199)
- "Large nesting colony of Painted storks identified near Sira (Karnataka)" Ameen Ahmed, Myforest (Quarterly Journal of Karnataka Forest Department), March 1999
- "Plea to protect fort in Sira" (Deccan Herald, Bangalore, 19 May 2008)
