= Sira, Karnataka =

Sira
- City
- Location in Karnataka, India
- Coordinates: 13.745°N 76.909°E
- Country: India
- State: Karnataka
- District: Tumkur

Government
  - Body: City Municipality Council

Area
  - City: 16 km^{2} (6.2 sq mi)
  - Rural: 1,538 km^{2} (594 sq mi)
- Elevation: 661 m (2,169 ft)

Population
  - City: 57,540
  - Density: 3,600/km^{2} (9,300/sq mi)

Languages
  - Official: Kannada
- Time zone: UTC+5:30 (IST)
- PIN: 572 137
- Telephone code: 08135
- ISO 3166 code: IN-KA
- Vehicle registration: KA-64
- Website: karnataka.gov.in

Sira is a city and taluk headquarters of Sira Taluk of Tumkur district in the state of Karnataka, India. It lies on the AH 47, NH 48 (earlier NH 4). The State Capital city, Bengaluru, is 120 km from Sira. It is known for its historical significance as a political and military center and for being the capital of Imperial Sira Subah in the early 1700s.

== Geography ==
Sira is located at 13.75°N 76.91°E. It has an average elevation of 662 metres (2171 feet).

== Demographics ==
Religions in Sira (2011)
Religion	Percent
Hindu	58.98%
Muslim	40.73%
Others†	0.26%
Not Stated	0.03%

As of 2011 India census, Sira had a population of 57,554. Males constitute 52% of the population and females 48%. The literacy rate of Sira city is 83.77%, which is higher than the state average of 75.36%. In Sira, male literacy is around 87.47% while female literacy is 79.99%. In Sira, 11.68% of the population is under 6 years of age.

== See also ==
- Sira Taluk
- Province of Sira
- Tumkur
- Tumkur District
- Taluks of Karnataka
- Hagalavadi
- Ajjenahalli, Sira
