= Indo-Saracenic architecture =

Revivalist architectural style

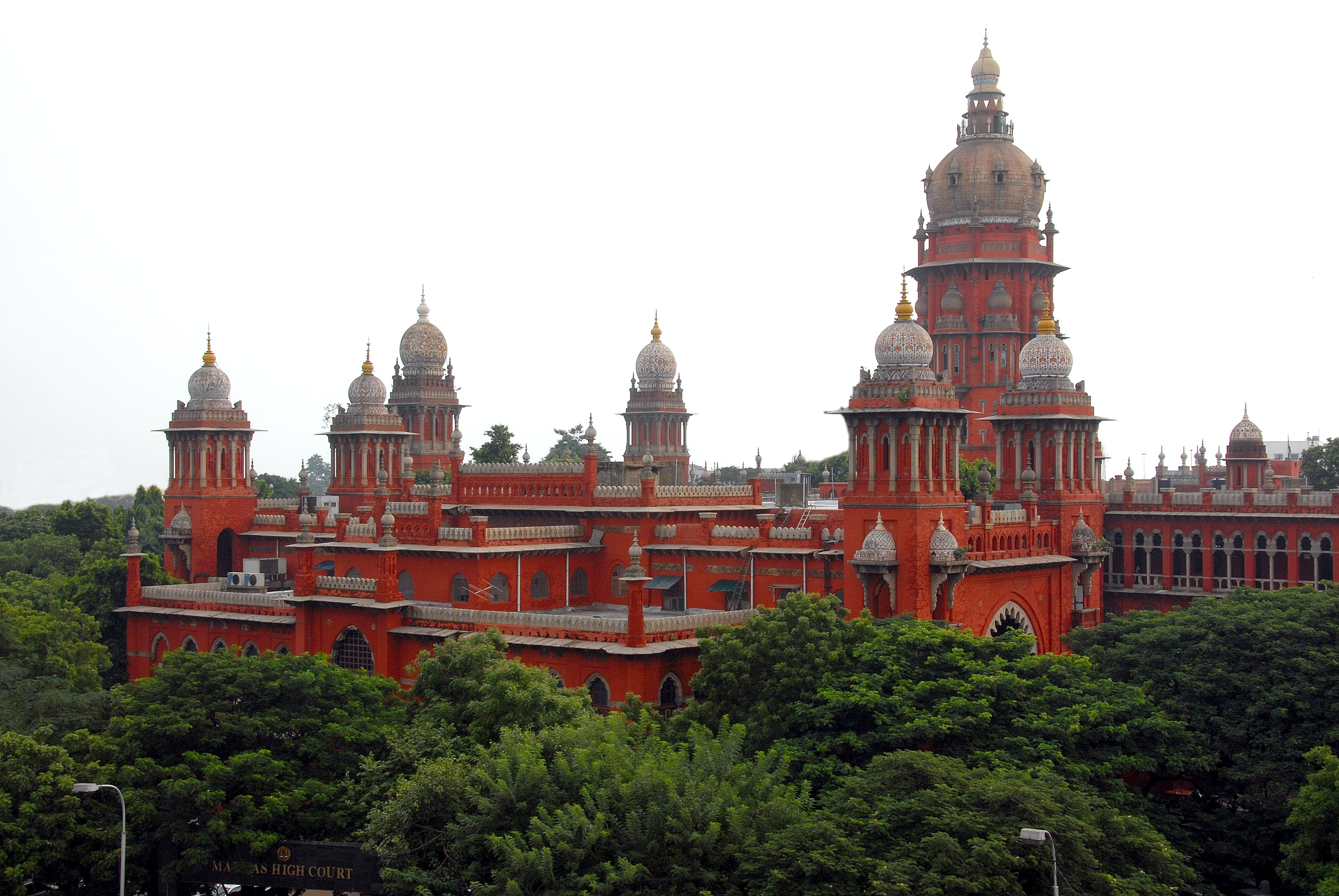
Madras High Court buildings are a prime example of Indo-Saracenic architecture, designed by J. W. Brassington under the guidance of British architect Henry Irwin, 1892.

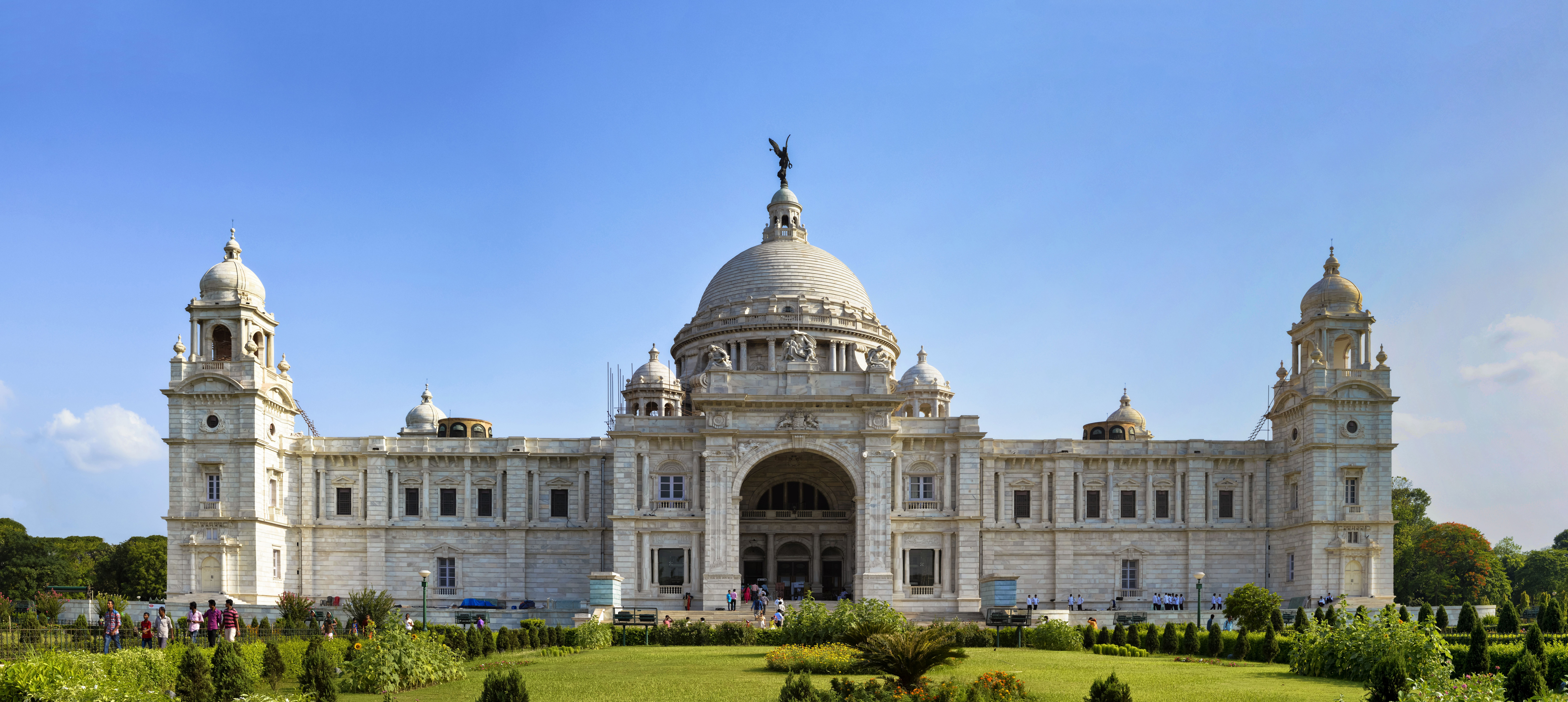
The Victoria Memorial, Kolkata, has very discreet Indo-Saracenic touches, such as the corner chatris, in the Raj metropolis least touched by the style.

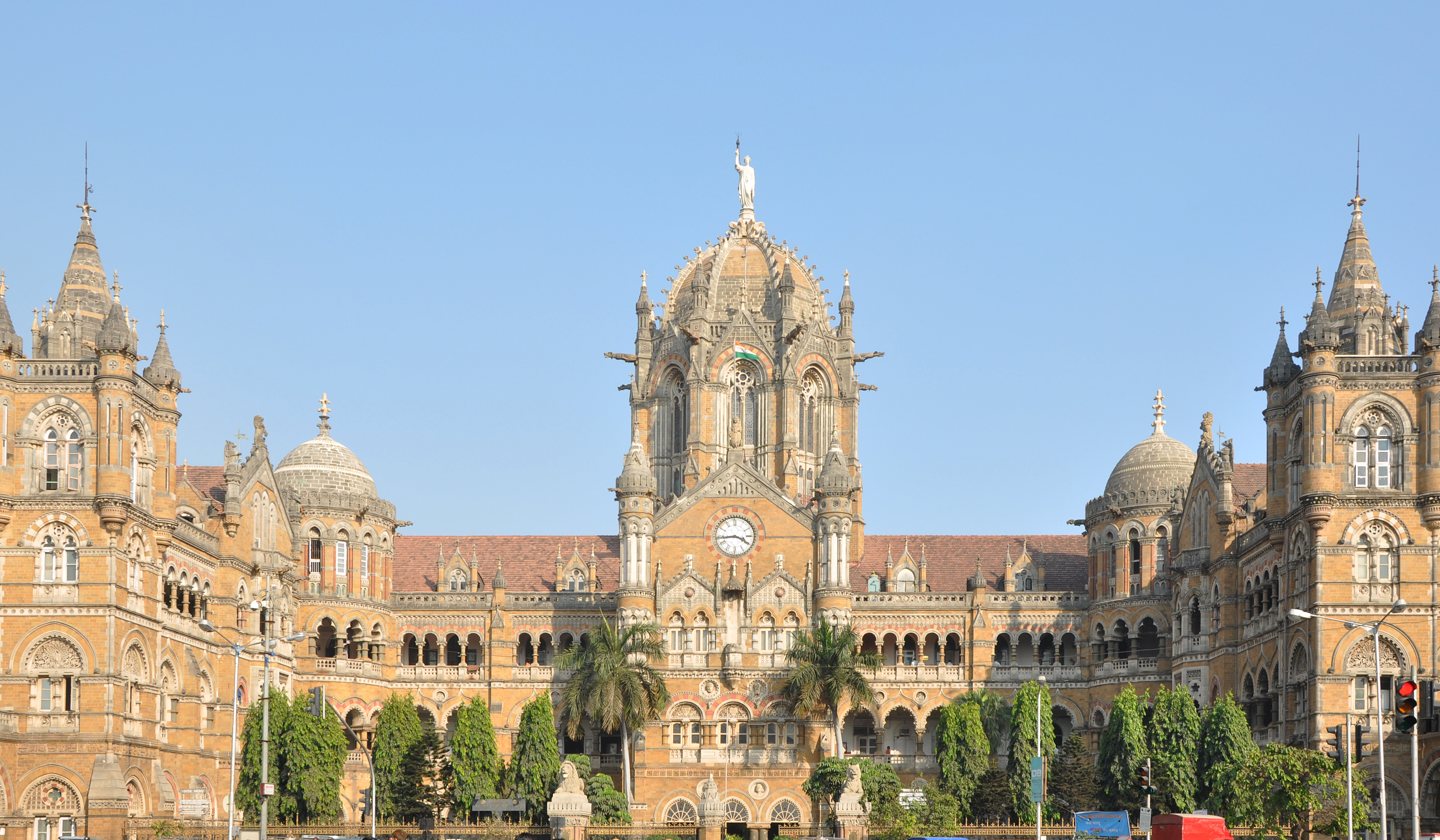
The Chhatrapati Shivaji Maharaj Terminus (previously Victoria Terminus) in Mumbai, 1878–88. A mixture of Romanesque, Gothic and Indian elements.

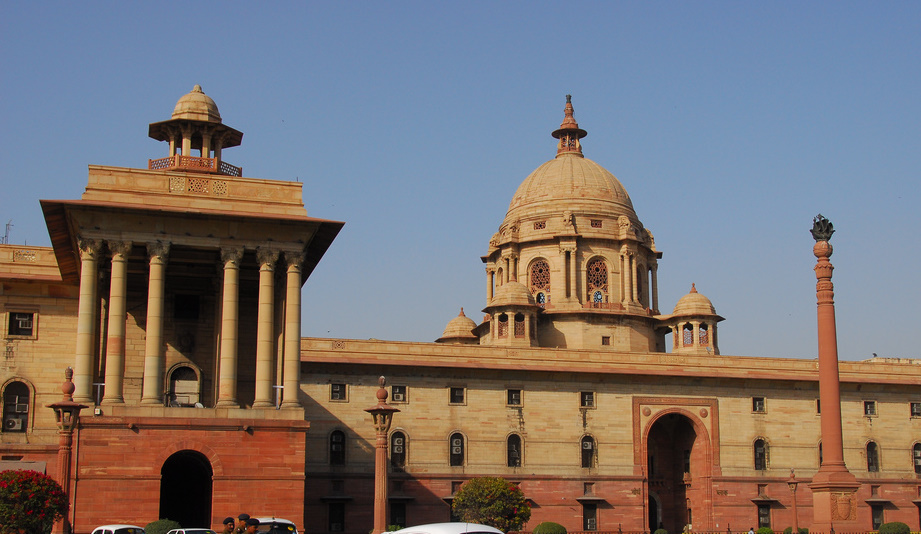
North Block of the Secretariat Building, New Delhi, designed by Herbert Baker.

Indo-Saracenic architecture (also known as Indo-Gothic, Mughal-Gothic, Neo-Mughal) was a revivalist architectural style mostly used by British architects in India in the late 19th century, especially in public and government buildings under the British Raj, and the palaces of rulers of the princely states. It drew stylistic and decorative elements from native Indo-Islamic architecture, especially Mughal architecture, which the British regarded as the classic Indian style. The basic layout and structure of the buildings tended to be close to that used in contemporary buildings in other revivalist styles, such as Gothic Revival and Neo-Classical, with specific Indian features and decoration added.

The style drew from western exposure to depictions of Indian buildings from about 1795, such as those by William Hodges and the Daniell duo (William Daniell and his uncle Thomas Daniell). The first Indo-Saracenic building is often said to be the Chepauk Palace, completed in 1768, in present-day Chennai (Madras), for the Nawab of Arcot. Bombay and Calcutta (as they then were), as the main centres of the Raj administration, saw many buildings constructed in the style, although Calcutta was also a bastion of European Neo-Classical architecture fused with Indic architectural elements. Most major buildings in India are now classified under the Heritage buildings category as laid down by the Archaeological Survey of India (ASI), and protected.

The style enjoyed a degree of popularity outside British India, where architects often mixed Islamic and European elements from various areas and periods with boldness, in the prevailing climate of eclecticism in architecture. Among other British colonies and protectorates in the region, it was adopted by architects and engineers in British Ceylon (present-day Sri Lanka) and the Federated Malay States (present-day Malaysia). The style was sometimes used, mostly for large houses, in the United Kingdom itself, for example at the royal Brighton Pavilion (1787–1823) and Sezincote House (1805) in Gloucestershire.

The wider European version, also popular in the Americas, is Moorish Revival architecture, which tends to use specific South Asian features less, and instead those characteristic of the Arabic-speaking countries; Neo-Mudéjar is the equivalent style in Spain. In India there had been an earlier inversion of the style in Lucknow before the British takeover in 1856, where Indian architects rather "randomly grafted European stylistic elements, as details and motifs, on to a skeleton derived from the Indo-Islamic school." This is known as the "Nawabi style." Saracen was a term used in the Middle Ages in Europe for the Arabic-speaking Muslim people of the Middle East and North Africa, and the term "Indo-Saracenic" was first used by the British to describe the earlier Indo-Islamic architecture of the Mughals and their predecessors, and often continued to be used in that sense. "Saracenic architecture" (without the "Indo-") was first used for the architecture of Muslim Spain, the most familiar Islamic architecture to most early 19th-century writers in English.

== Characteristics ==
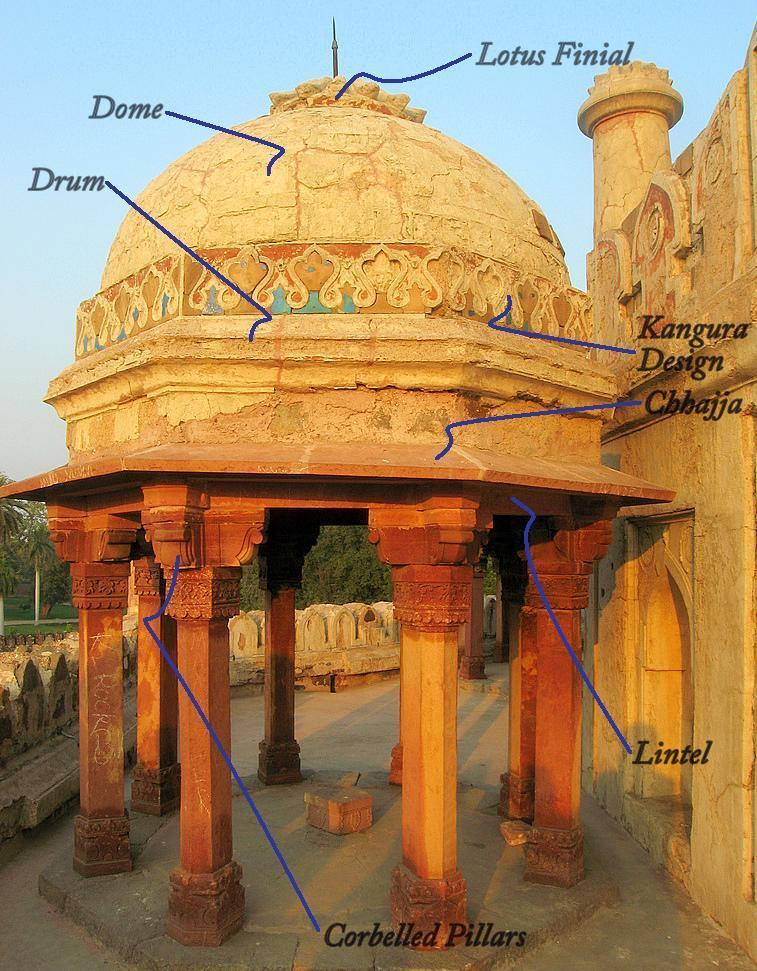
Features of the style.

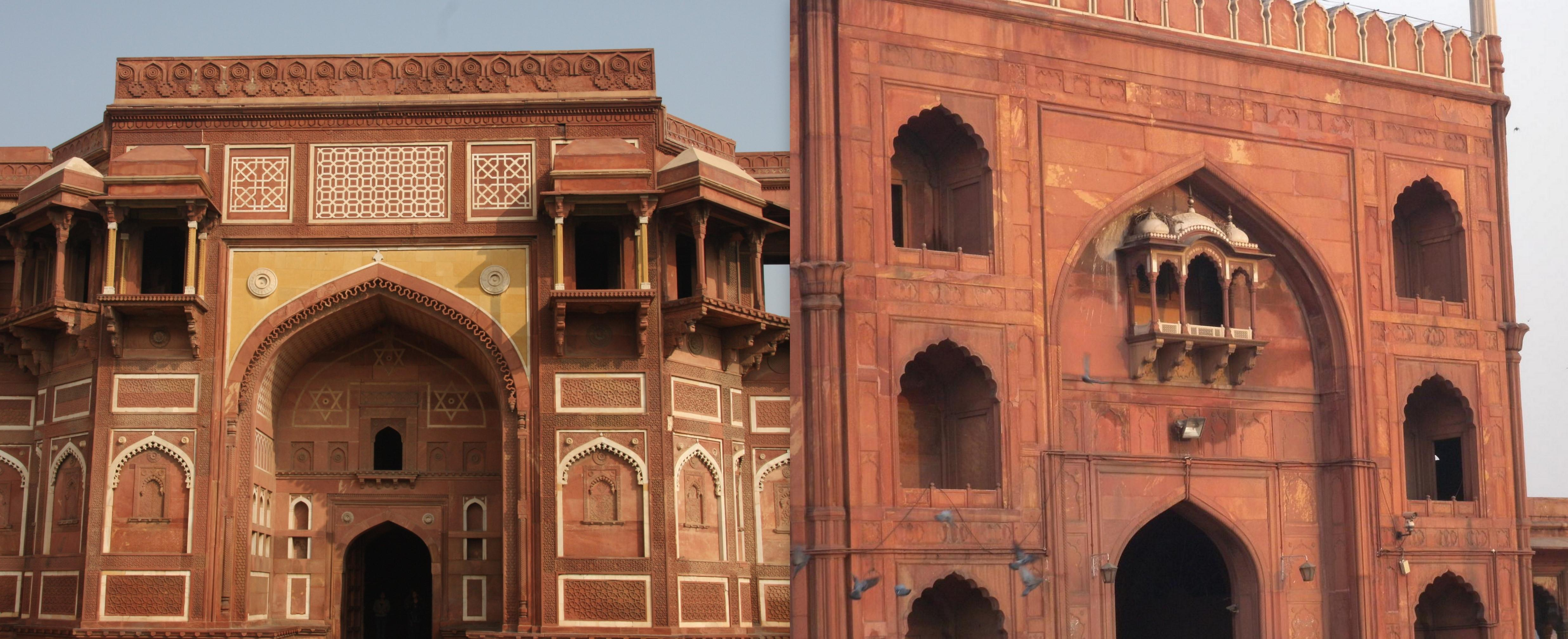
Original Mughal architecture

With a number of exceptions from earlier, most Indo-Saracenic public buildings were constructed by parts of the British Raj government of India, in place between 1858 and 1947, with the peak period beginning around 1880. They partly reflected the British aspiration for an "Imperial style" of their own, rendered on an intentionally grand scale, reflecting and promoting a notion of an unassailable and invincible British Empire, The style has been described as "part of a 19th-century movement to project themselves as the natural successors of the Mughals".

At the same time they were built for modern functions such as railway stations, government offices for an increasingly wide-reaching bureaucracy, and law courts. They often incorporated modern construction methods and facilities. While stone was typically used, at least as a facing, these included substructures composed of iron, steel and poured concrete, and later reinforced concrete and pre-cast concrete elements.

The style has been said, by a native of Kolkata, to be most common in "Southern and Western India", and of the three main cities of the 19th-century Raj, it was and is much more evident in Mumbai and Chennai rather than Kolkata, where both public government buildings, and the mansions of wealthy Indians tended to use versions of European Neoclassical architecture. Madras (now Chennai) was a particular centre of the style, but still tended to use details from Mughal architecture, which had barely ever reached Tamil Nadu before. This was partly because English authorities such as James Fergusson especially deprecated Dravidian architecture, which would also have been harder and more expensive to adapt to modern building functions.

Typical elements found include:

- onion (bulbous) domes
- Chhajja, overhanging eaves, often supported by conspicuous brackets
- pointed arches, cusped arches, or scalloped arches
- horseshoe arches, in fact characteristic of Islamic Spain or North Africa, but often used
- contrasting colours of voussoirs round an arch, especially red and white; another feature more typical of North Africa and Spain
- curved roofs in Bengali styles such as char-chala
- domed chhatri kiosks on the roofline
- pinnacles
- towers or minarets
- open pavilions or pavilions with Bangala roofs
- jalis or openwork screens
- Mashrabiya or jharokha-style screened windows
- Iwans, in the form of entrances set back from the facade, under an arch.

Chief proponents of this style of architecture included Robert Fellowes Chisholm, Sir Samuel Swinton Jacob, Charles Mant, Henry Irwin, William Emerson, George Wittet and Frederick Stevens, along with numerous other skilled professionals and artisans throughout Europe and the Americas.

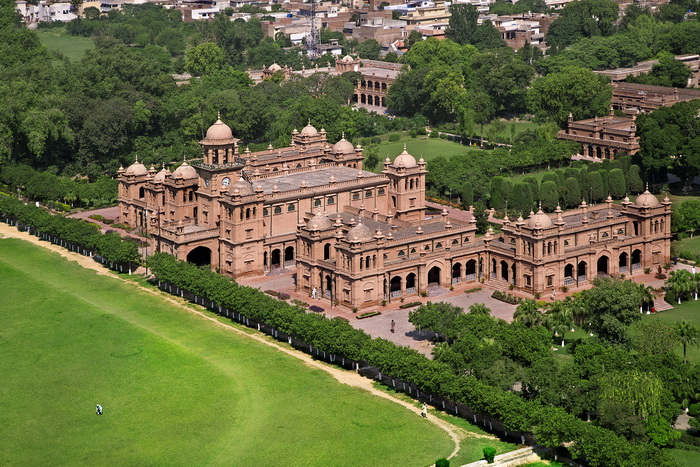
Islamia College, Peshawar, begun 1913

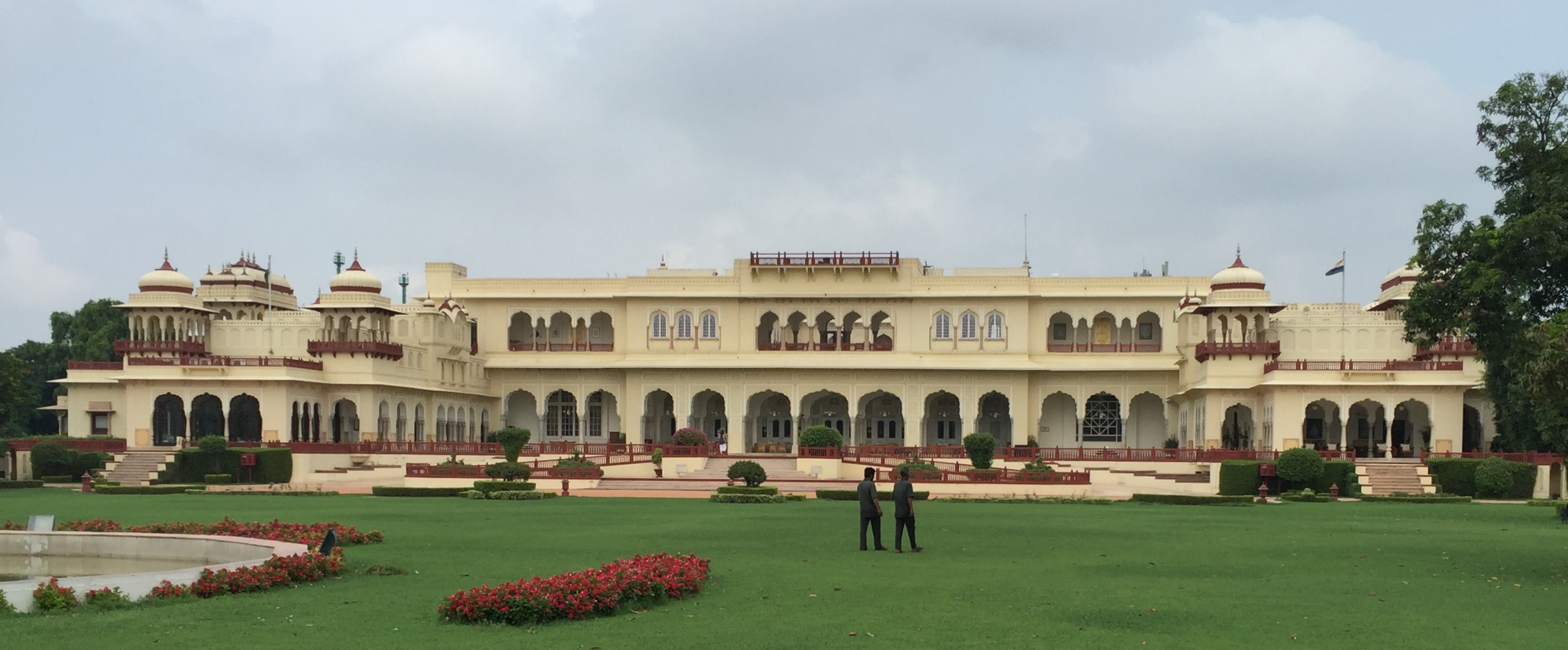
The Rambagh Palace in Jaipur reflecting Imperial Rajasthani architecture. Early 20th-century.

Structures built in Indo-Saracenic style in India and in other Asian countries were predominantly grand public edifices, such as railway stations, museums, and courthouses. The style was also used for civic buildings such as colleges and town halls. In Britain itself King George IV's Royal Pavilion at Brighton was twice threatened with being torn down.

Typically, in India, villages, towns and cities of some means would lavish significant sums on construction of such architectural works when plans were drawn up for construction of the local and art galleries. The cost involved in the construction of buildings of this style was relatively high, often involving much detailed stone carving, hence the style was mostly used only for large public buildings. But some residential houses were built by the wealthy, especially rulers of the princely states.

== Indian context ==
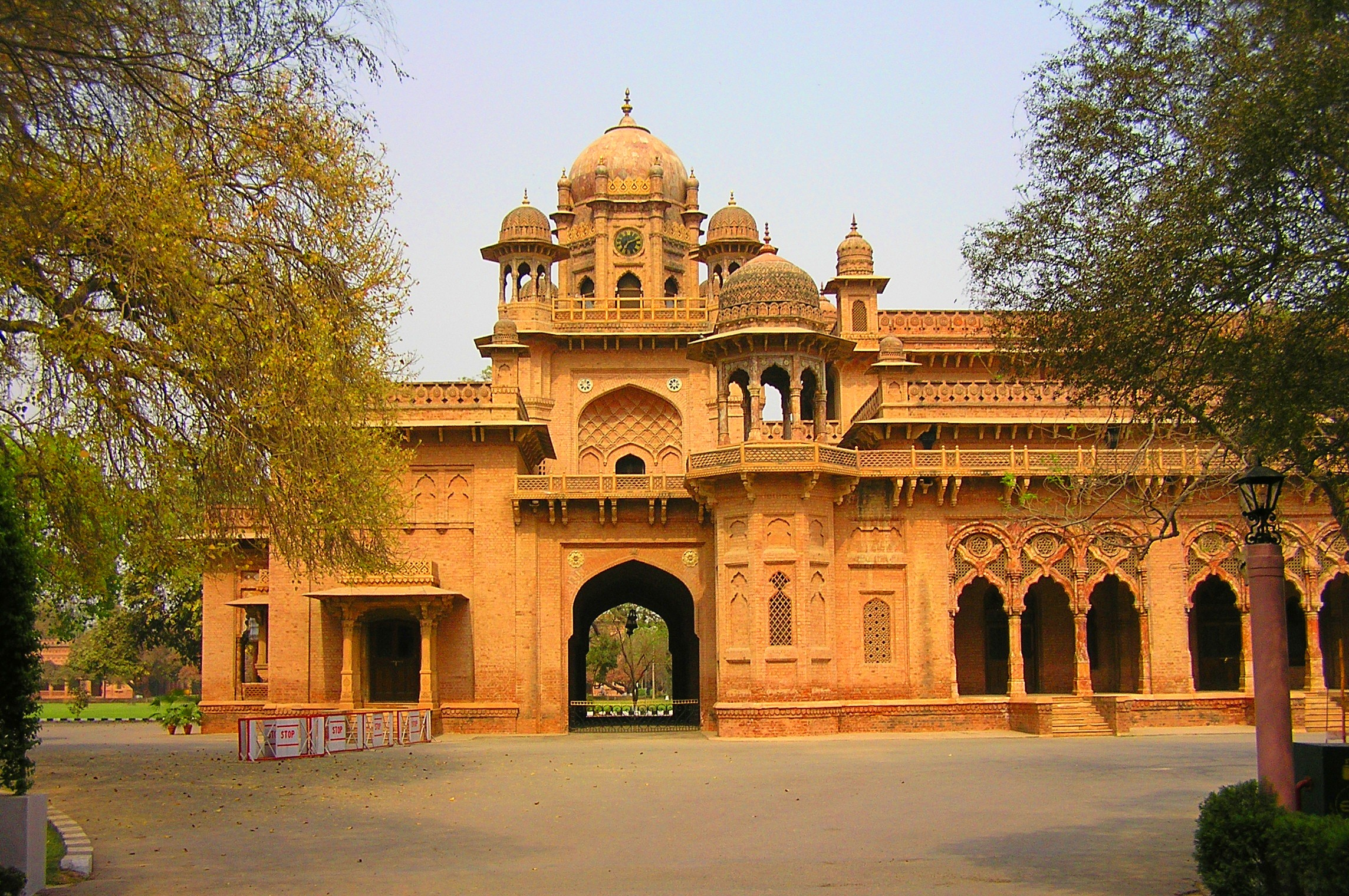
Aitchison College in Lahore with domed chhatris, jalis, chhajja below the balcony, and other features, reflective of Rajput architecture.

Confluence of different architectural styles had been attempted before during the mainly Turkic, Delhi Sultanate and Mughal periods. Turkic and Mughal incursions in the Indian subcontinent, introduced new concepts in the architecture of India. The prevailing style of architecture was trabeate, employing pillars, beams and lintels, with less emphasis on arches and domes used during earlier Buddhist periods. The Turkic invaders brought in the arcuate style of construction, with more emphasis on arches and beams, which flourished with Mughal and Taluqdars by building and incorporating Indian architecture, especially Rajasthani temple architecture and Imperial Rajput palace/fort/urban architecture as well.

Local influences also led to different 'orders' of the Indo-Islamic style. After the disintegration of the Turkic Delhi Sultanate, rulers of individual states established their own rule and hence their own architectural styles which were imitations of local/regional Indian architectural schools. Examples of these are the 'Bengal' and the 'Gujarat' schools. Motifs such as chhajja (a sunshade or eave laid on cantilever brackets fixed into and projecting from the walls), corbel brackets with richly carved "stalactite" pendentive decorations, balconies, kiosks or chhatris, and minars (tall towers) were characteristic of the imitation-Mughal architecture style, which was to become a lasting legacy of the nearly four hundred years of the Mughal presence in these areas.

== Mughal style ==
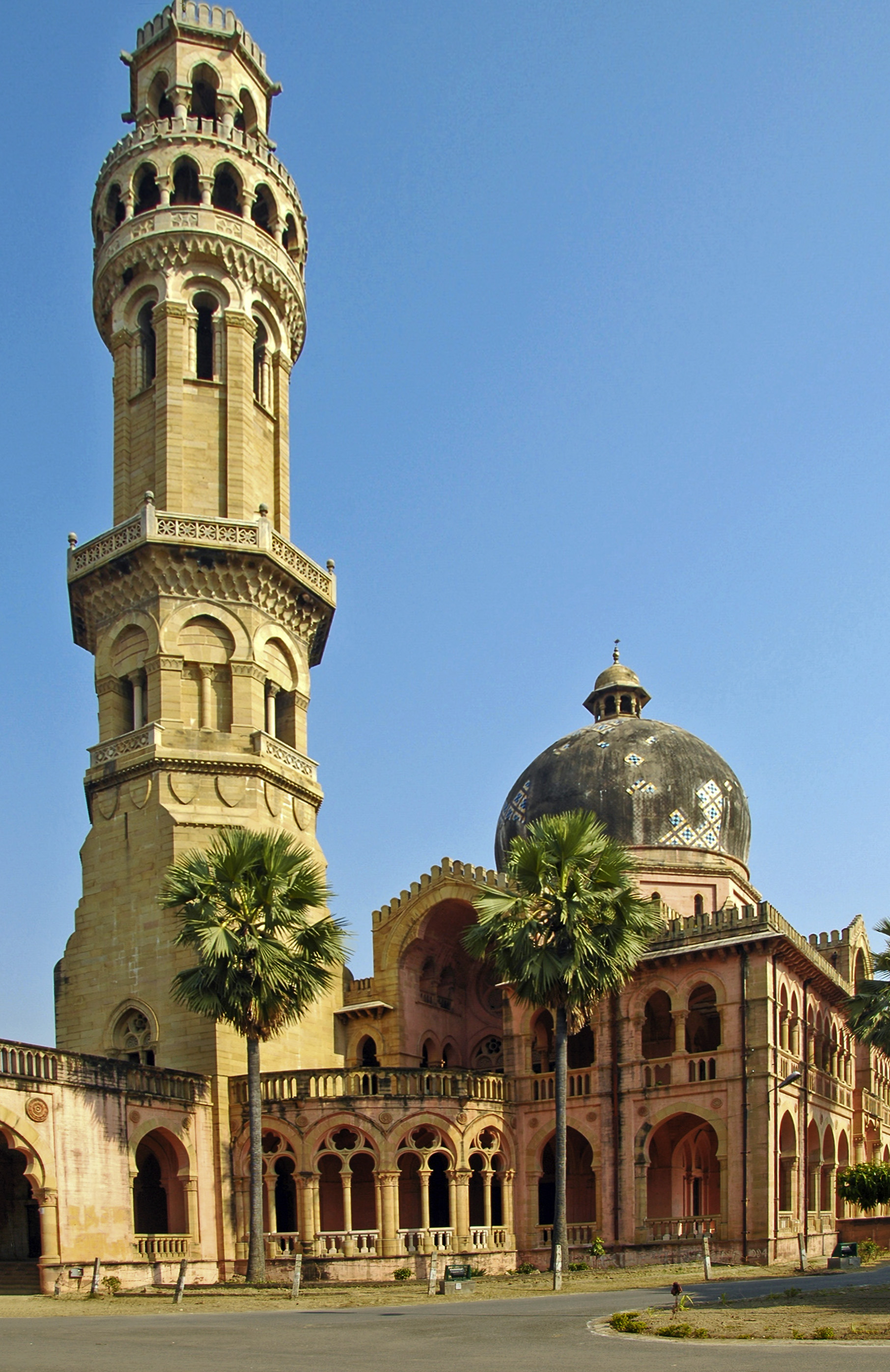
Vizianagaram Hall in 2007 (since renovated): University of Allahabad, Allahabad, by Sir William Emerson

Mughal architecture developed the Indo-Islamic architecture of the Delhi Sultanate with a further addition of Timurid and Persian elements. The height of the style was perhaps reached under Akbar, the third Mughal emperor. Some of the significant architectural works of the Mughals are Humayun's Tomb, the Taj Mahal, the Forts of Agra and Lahore, the city of Fatehpur Sikri, Akbar's Tomb.

=== Decline ===
Shah Jahan was succeeded by his son, Aurangzeb, who had little interest in art and architecture. As a result, Mughal commissioned architecture suffered, with most engineers, architects and artisans migrating to work under the patronage of local rulers. By the early 19th century, the British East India Company (EIC) controlled large portions of the Indian subcontinent. In 1803, their control was further strengthened after defeating the Maratha Empire which was led by Daulat Rao Sindhia. The EIC legitimized their rule by taking Mughal emperor Shah Alam II under their protection, and ruling in conjunction with him. However, their power was yet again challenged when in 1857 Indian soldiers in their employ, together with rebellious princes including Rani of Jhansi, launched the Indian Rebellion of 1857. However, this uprising was suppressed within a year and marked the end of the Mughal Empire, which was formally dissolved by the British. After the rebellion, the EIC's territories in India were formally transferred by the British government to Crown rule; the EIC dissolved soon after.

== British Empire ==
=== British Raj ===
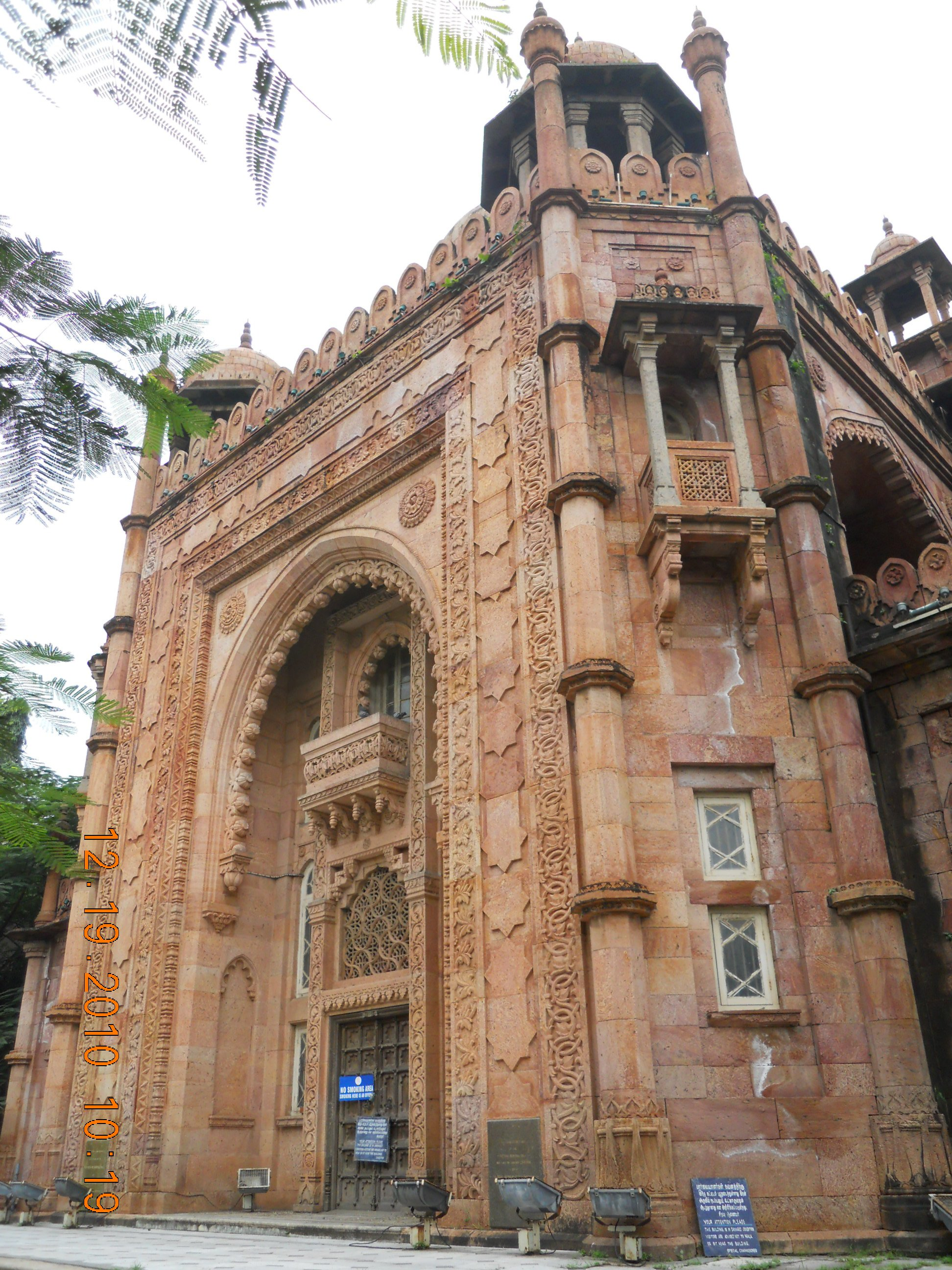
The National Art Gallery (Chennai)

In 1861, the new British colonial administration established the Archaeological Survey of India, gradually restoring several important Indian monuments (such as the Taj Mahal) over the following decades. To usher in a new era, the British "Raj", a new architectural tradition was sought, marrying the existing styles of India with imported styles from the West, such as Gothic (with its sub styles of French gothic, Venetian-Moorish), Neoclassical and, later, new styles such as Art Deco. This produced a number of buildings with mixed influences. By doing this they kept Indian architecture while adding elements of British and European architecture; this, coupled with the British allowing regional Indian princes to stay in power under various agreements, made their presence more "palatable" for the Indians. The British attempted to encapsulate the Subcontinent's past within their new imperial British Indian buildings and so represent Britain's Raj as legitimate to the Indian public.

The main building of Mayo College, completed in 1885, was built in the Indo-Saracenic style. Examples in Chennai include the Victoria Public Hall, Madras High Court, Senate House of the University of Madras, and the Chennai Central railway station. The building of New Delhi as the new imperial capital, which mostly took place between 1918 and 1931, led by Sir Edwin Lutyens, brought the last flowering of the style, using a deeper understanding of Indian architecture. The Rashtrapati Bhavan (Viceroy's, then President's Palace) uses elements from Buddhist-era Indian architecture as well as those from later periods. This can be seen in the capitals of the columns and the screen around the drum below the main dome, drawing on the railings placed around ancient stupas.

=== Malaya ===
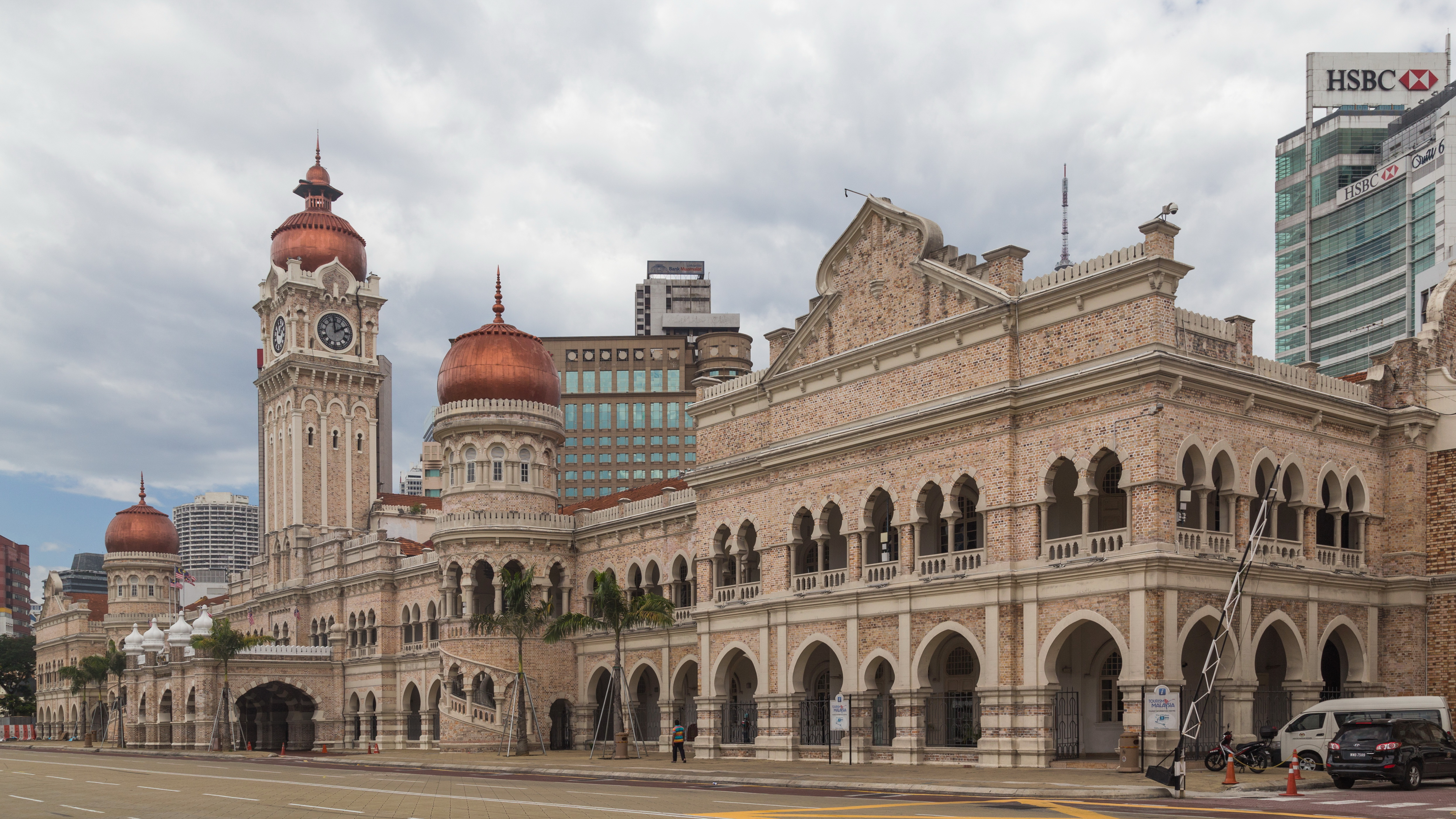
Sultan Abdul Samad Building in Kuala Lumpur

According to Thomas R. Metcalf, a leading scholar of the style, "the Indo-Saracenic, with its imagined past turned to the purposes of British colonialism, took shape outside India [ie the subcontinent] most fully only in Malaya". British Malaya was a predominantly Muslim society, where there was hardly any recent tradition of building in brick or stone, with even mosques and the palaces of the local rulers built in the abundant local hardwoods. Kuala Lumpur was only a small settlement when in 1895 the British decided to make it the capital of their new Federated Malay States; it needed a number of large public buildings. The British decided to use the Islamic style they were used to from India, despite its having little relationship to existing local architectural styles.

Unlike in India, the British also built some palaces for the sultans of the several states into which modern Malaysia remains divided, and in some places where the population was greatly expanded, mosques, such as the Jamek Mosque and Ubudiah Mosque. These were both designed by Arthur Benison Hubback, the leading architect in the style between his arrival in 1895 and retirement in 1917, during which it experienced its peak in popularity. The lack of local precedents allowed the English architects to create "an architecture defined purely by Orientalist fantasy", according to Metcalf, who says Hubback's Ubudiah Mosque (Kuala Kangsar, 1913) "conjures up nothing less than a Victorian illustrator's fantasy from the Arabian Nights".

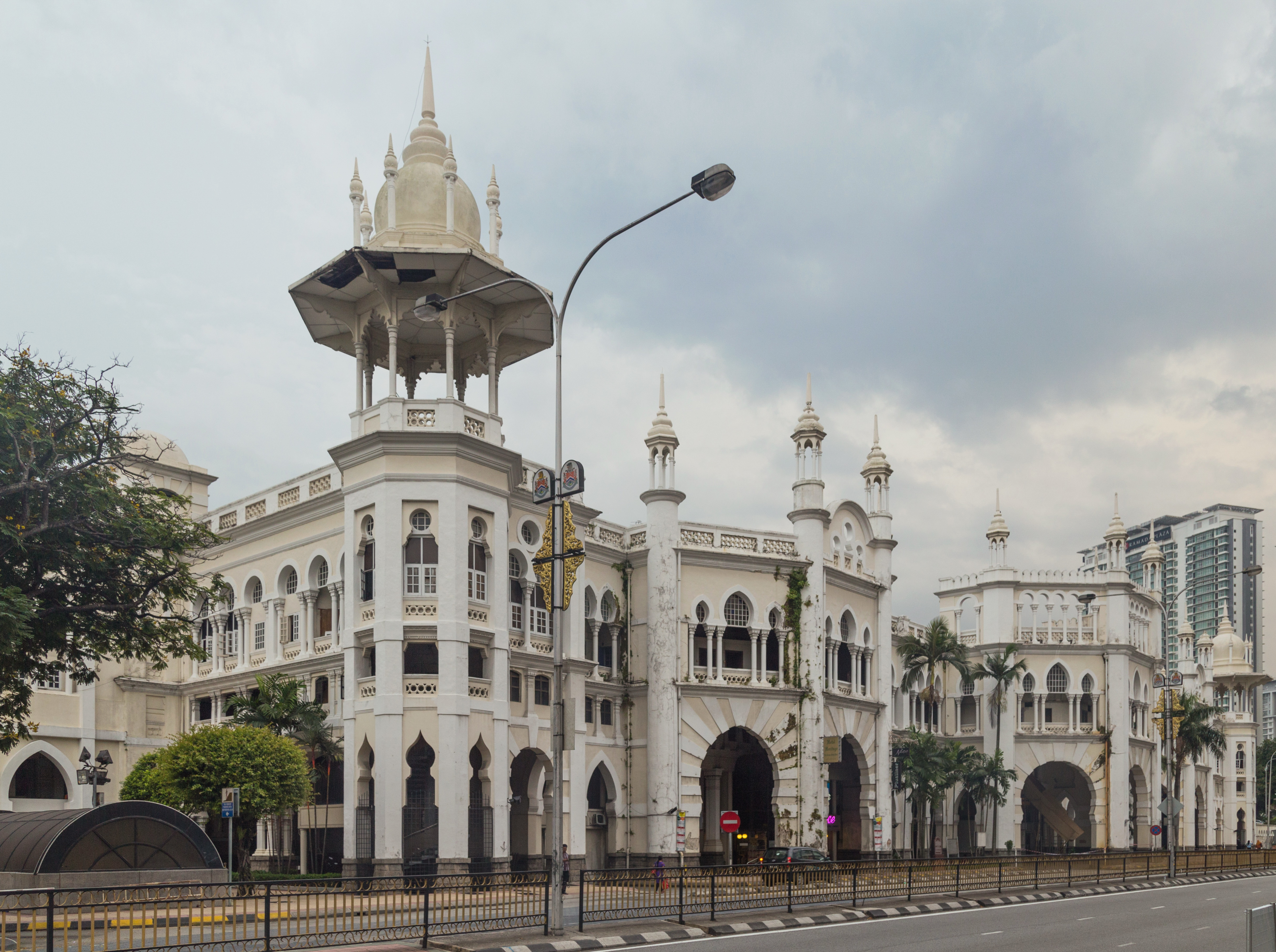
Kuala Lumpur Railway Station, by Arthur Benison Hubback, 1910.

Contrary to what is sometimes claimed, the leading figures were English professional architects (whereas in India former soldiers or military engineers were often used) who had never worked in India. Usually they could design in both Indo-Saracenic and European styles. For example, the major buildings by Regent Alfred John Bidwell, who left his career in London at the age of 34 in 1893 to take a public appointment in Malaysia, include Kuala Lumpur's Sultan Abdul Samad Building (originally the "Government Offices", 1894), in a free Islamic style, perhaps more Egyptian than Mughal, and with many horseshoe arches. After moving to private practice in Singapore, Bidwell designed the thoroughly European Raffles Hotel (1899). In Singapore European styles had been the norm since the first British public building there in 1827, both copying Calcutta and reflecting a smaller proportion of Muslim Malays in the population, and the role of the city as a military and trade base. Metcalf notes that despite a large Chinese population, neither in Singapore nor in Hong Kong were public buildings with influences from Chinese architecture built in this period.

The Government Offices were the first major British commission in Malaya, and Bidwell had proposed a European style, but was over-ruled by C. E. Spooner, then State Engineer of the Public Works Department, a military engineer with many years experience in Ceylon, who told those assembled for the opening ceremony "I then decided on the Mahametan style". He did not design buildings himself, but was a key figure in approving designs. The commission brought together Spooner, A.C. Norman, Bidwell, and the newly arrived Hubback (from 1895). The building's construction inspired additional civic buildings in the vicinity to be built in a similar style, while the style's elements would see more limited adoption among private buildings in Malaya. However artificial a creation the Malayan British Islamic style is, it is noticeable that most major public buildings survive long after Malayan independence in 1957 and the formation of Malaysia in 1963, remaining well-cared for on their prime city sites, many re-purposed as their original functions are now carried out in more modern buildings elsewhere.

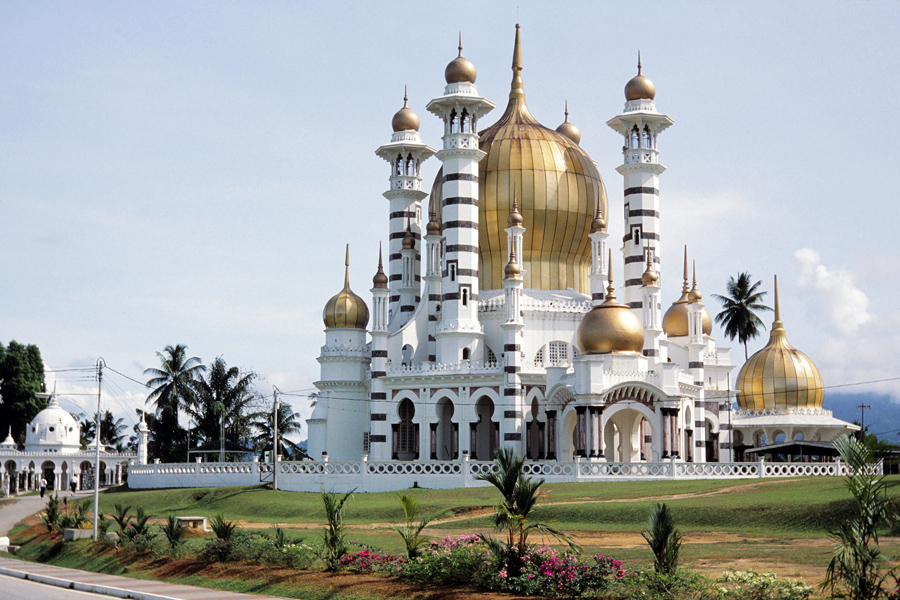
Ubudiah Mosque (Hubback, 1913), Kuala Kangsar, Perak

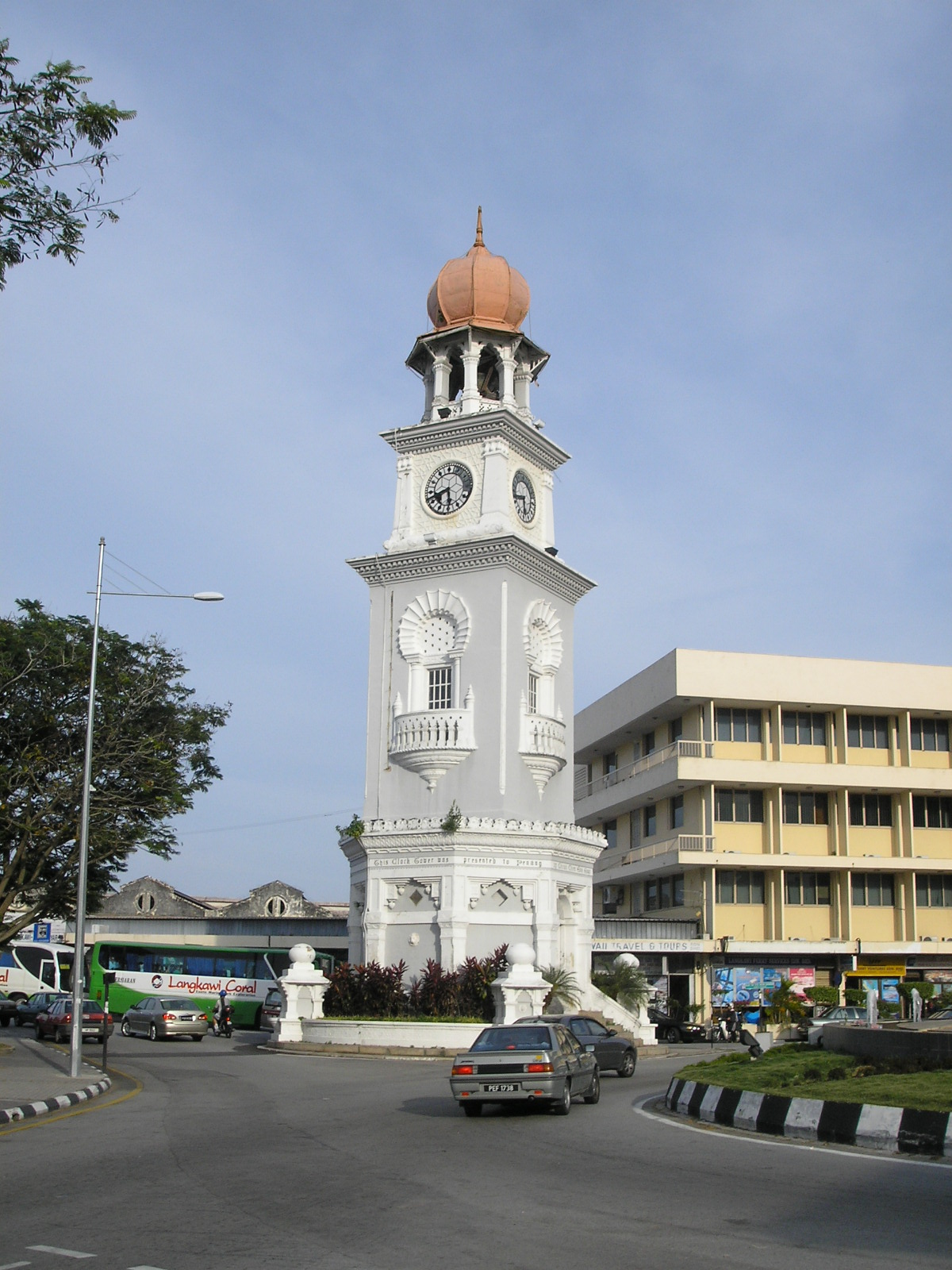
Jubilee Clock Tower in George Town, Penang

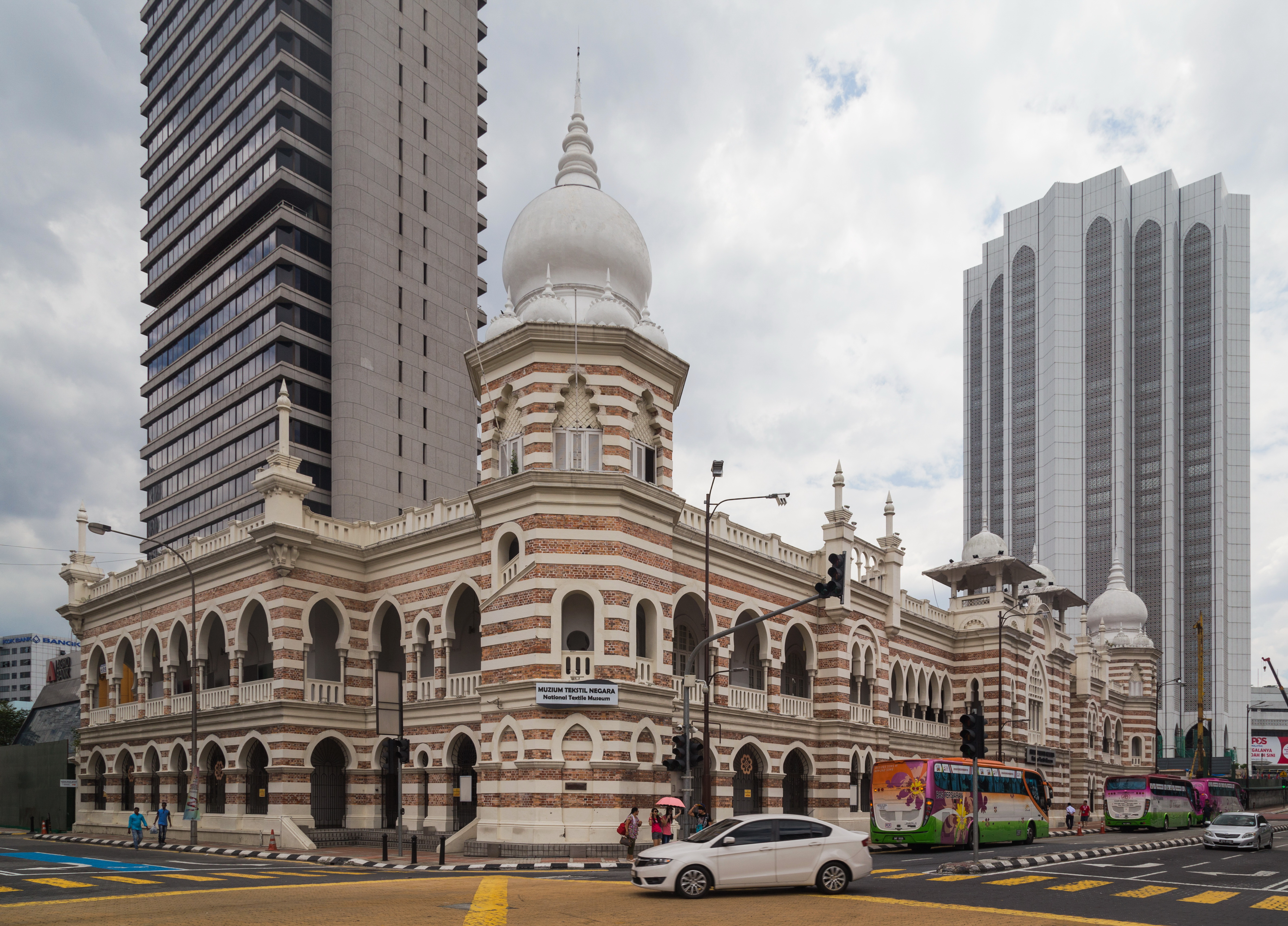
National Textile Museum in Kuala Lumpur, by Hubback, 1905. Originally as offices for the Federated Malay States Railways.

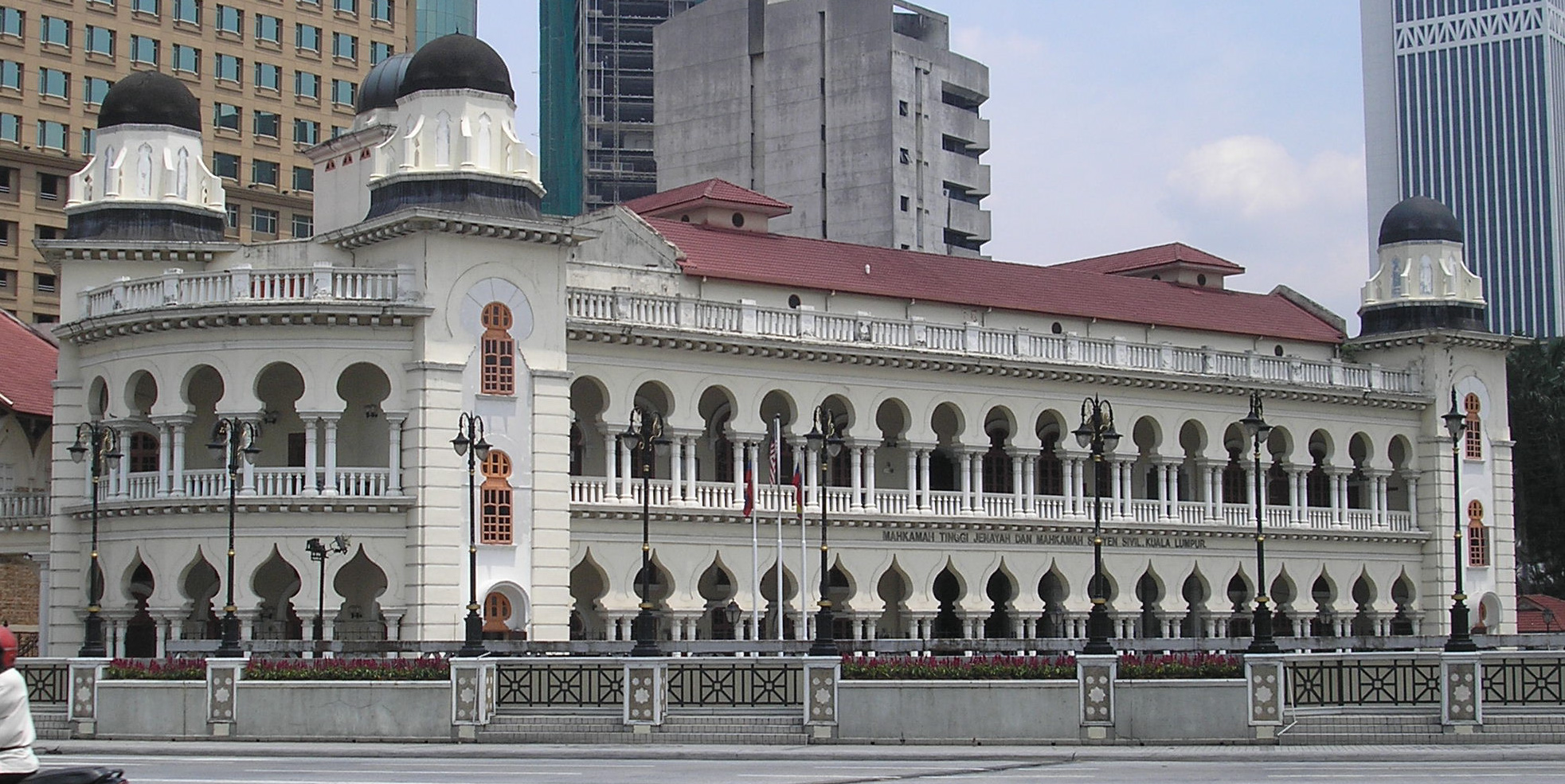
The Old High Court Building, Kuala Lumpur

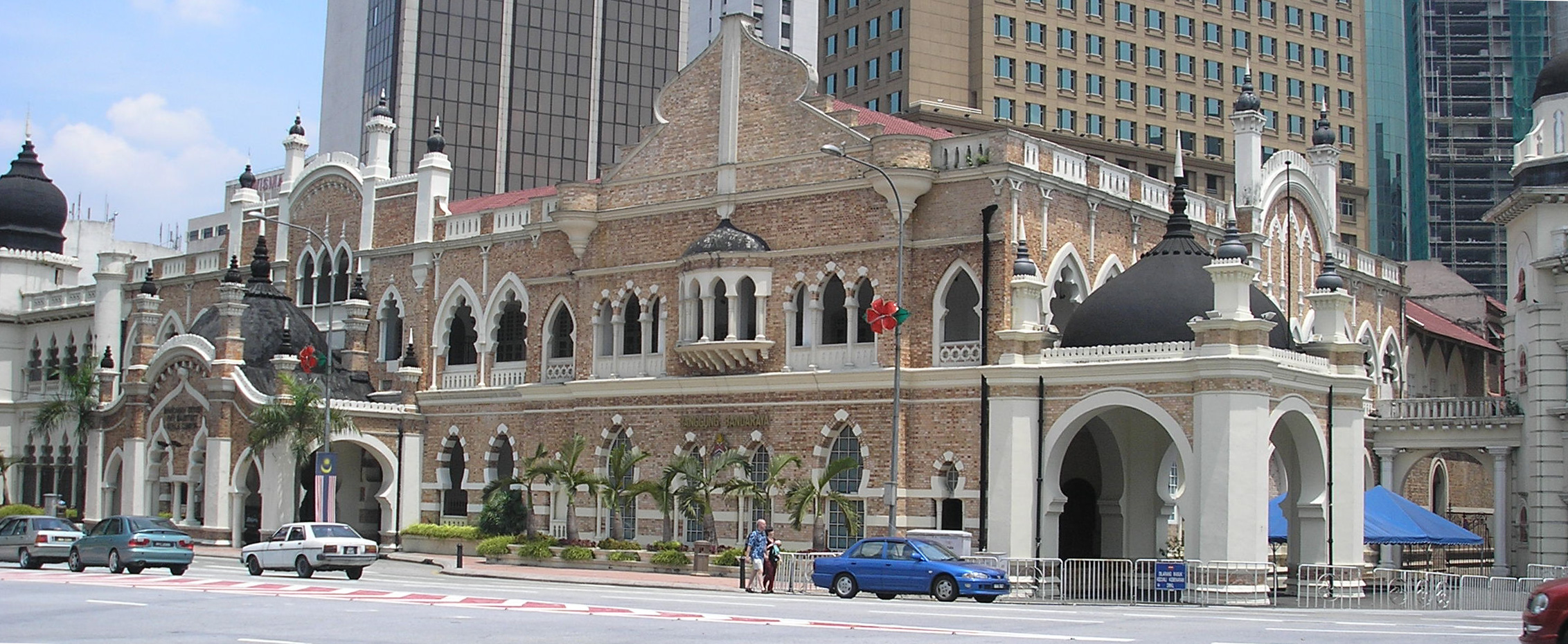
Old Kuala Lumpur Town Hall, Hubback, 1896-1904

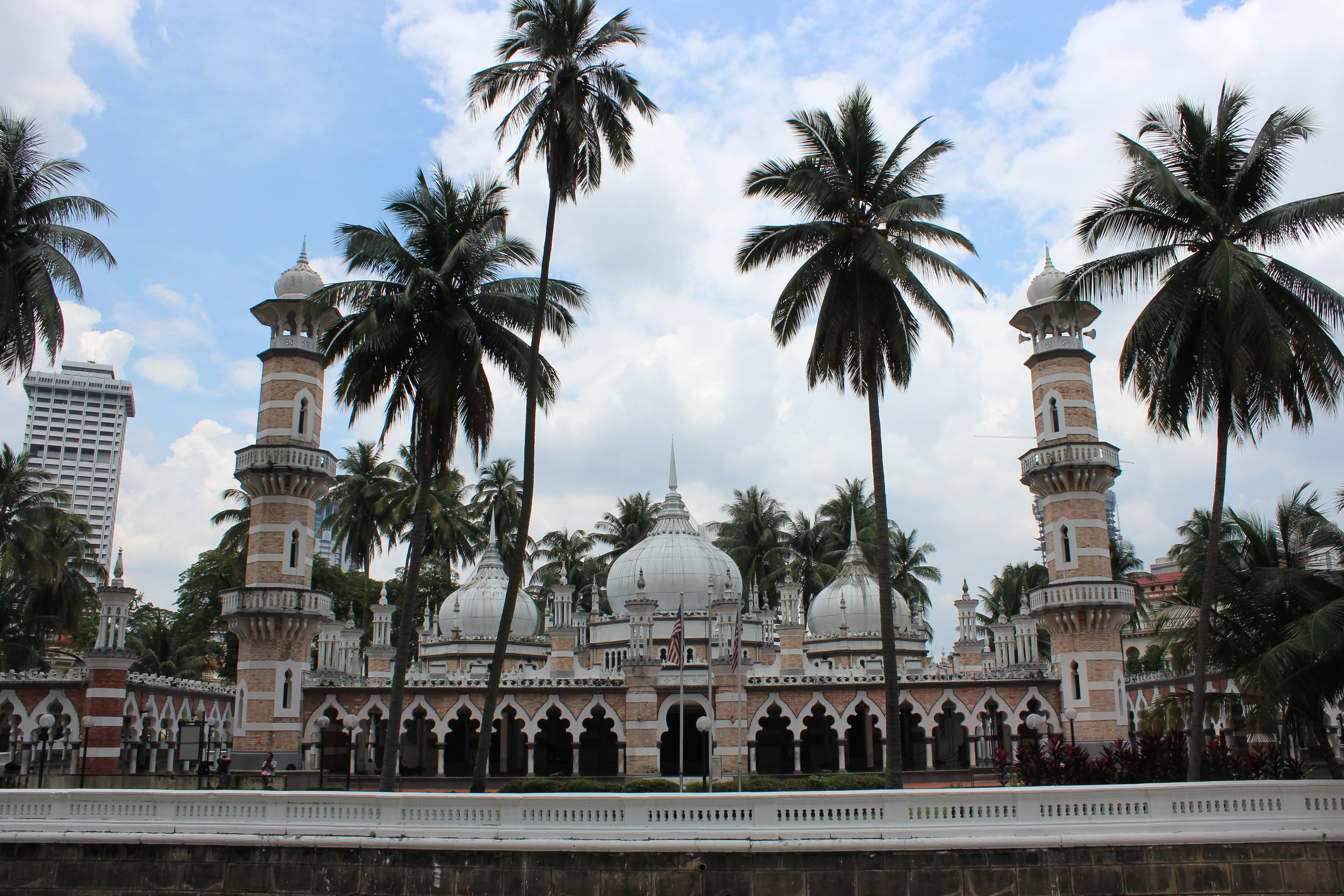
Jamek Mosque in Kuala Lumpur, by Hubback

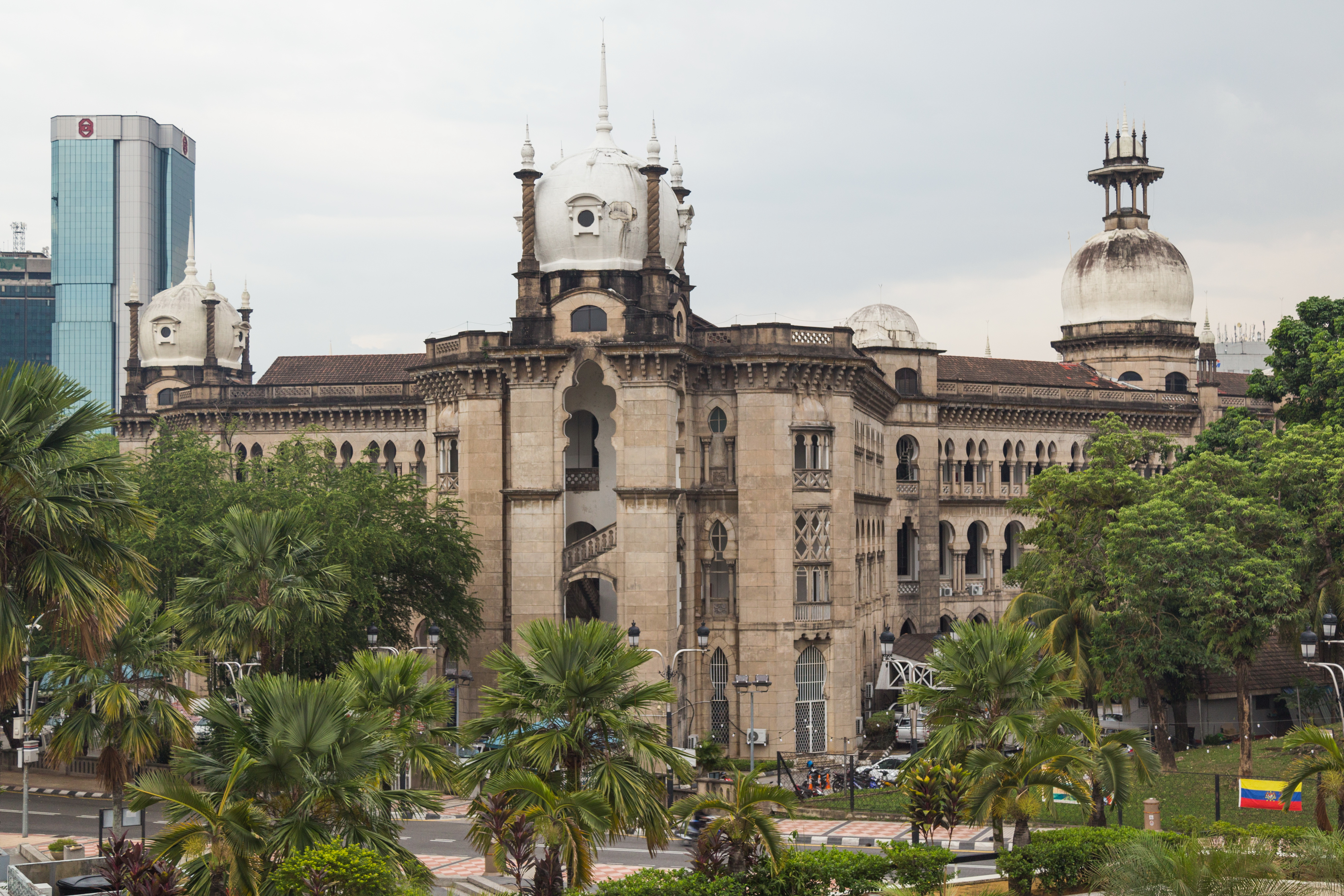
Railway Administration Building, Kuala Lumpur

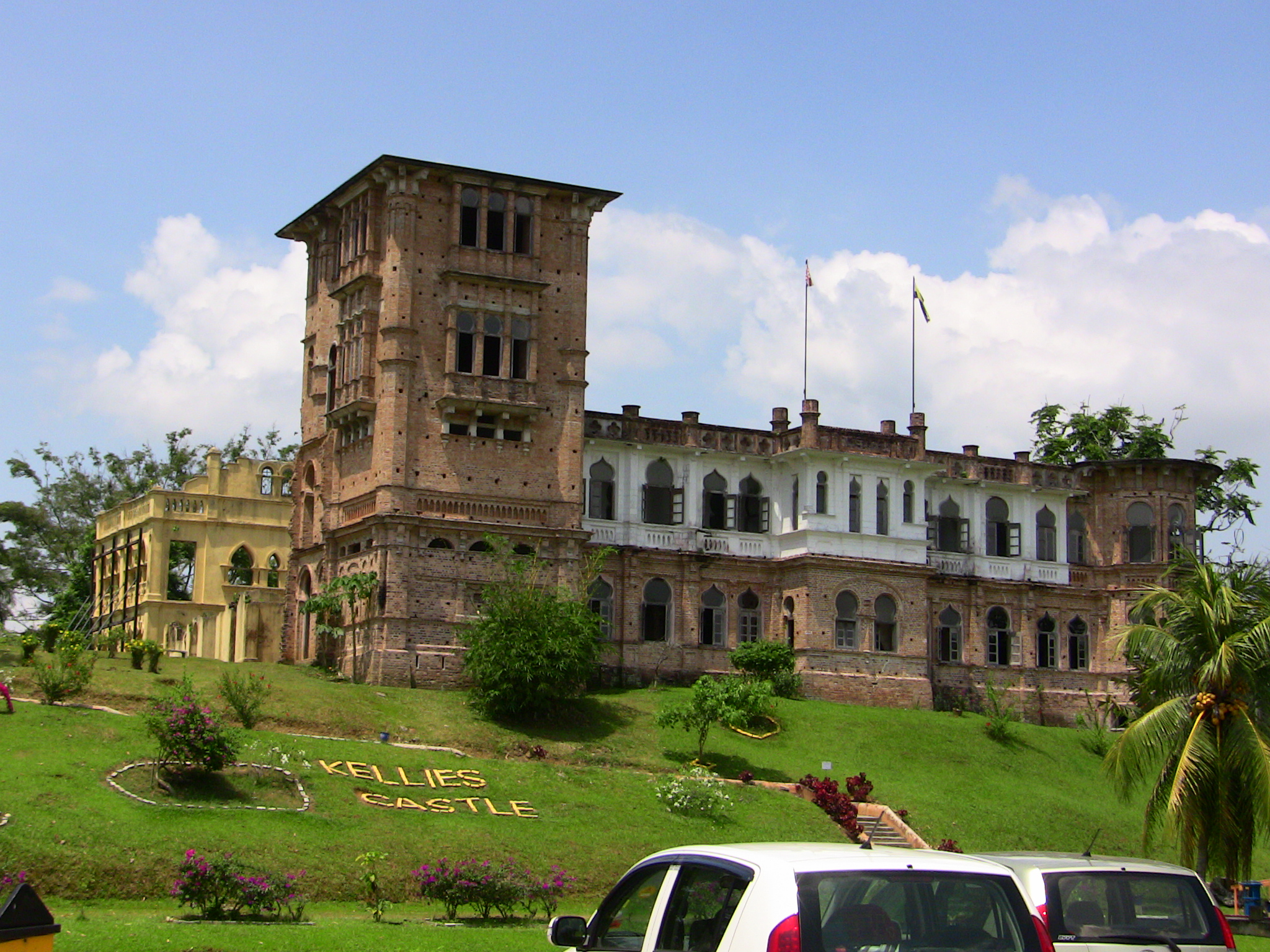
Kellie's Castle, Batu Gajah, Perak

== Examples ==
=== Bangladesh ===
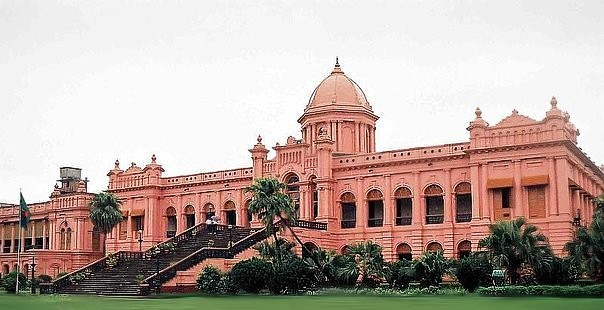
Ahsan Manzil in Dhaka

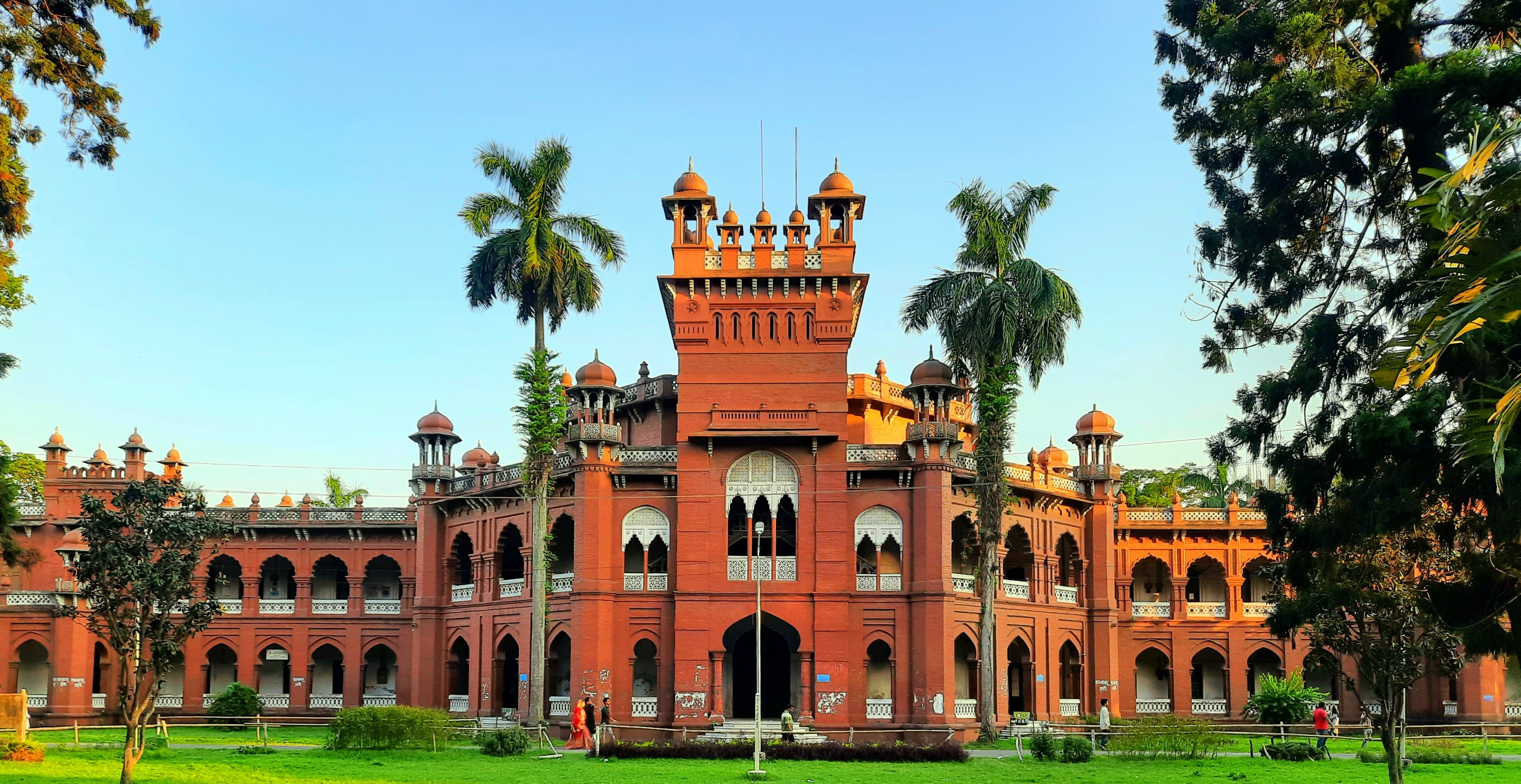
Curzon Hall of University of Dhaka

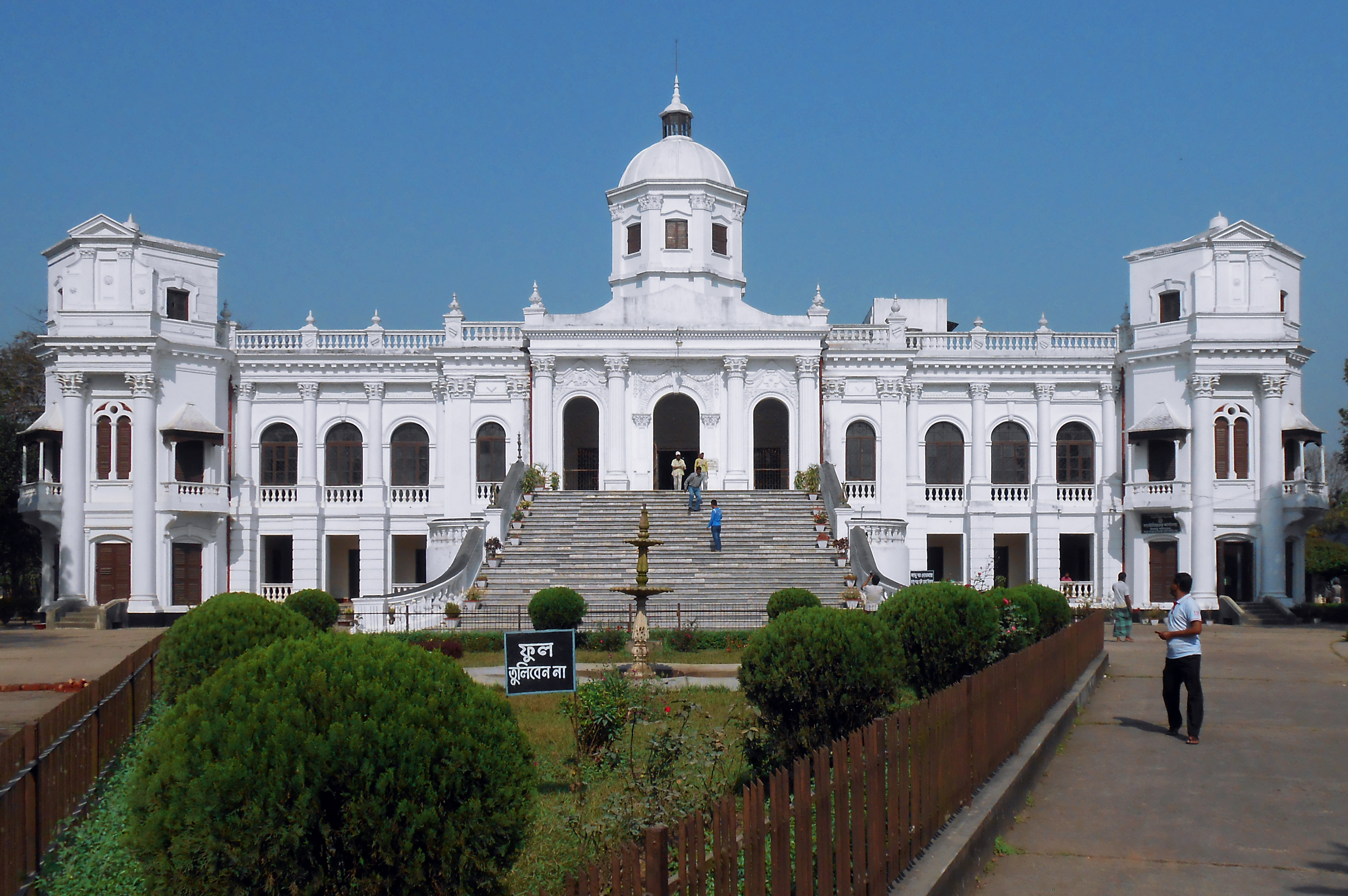
Tajhat Palace in Rangpur

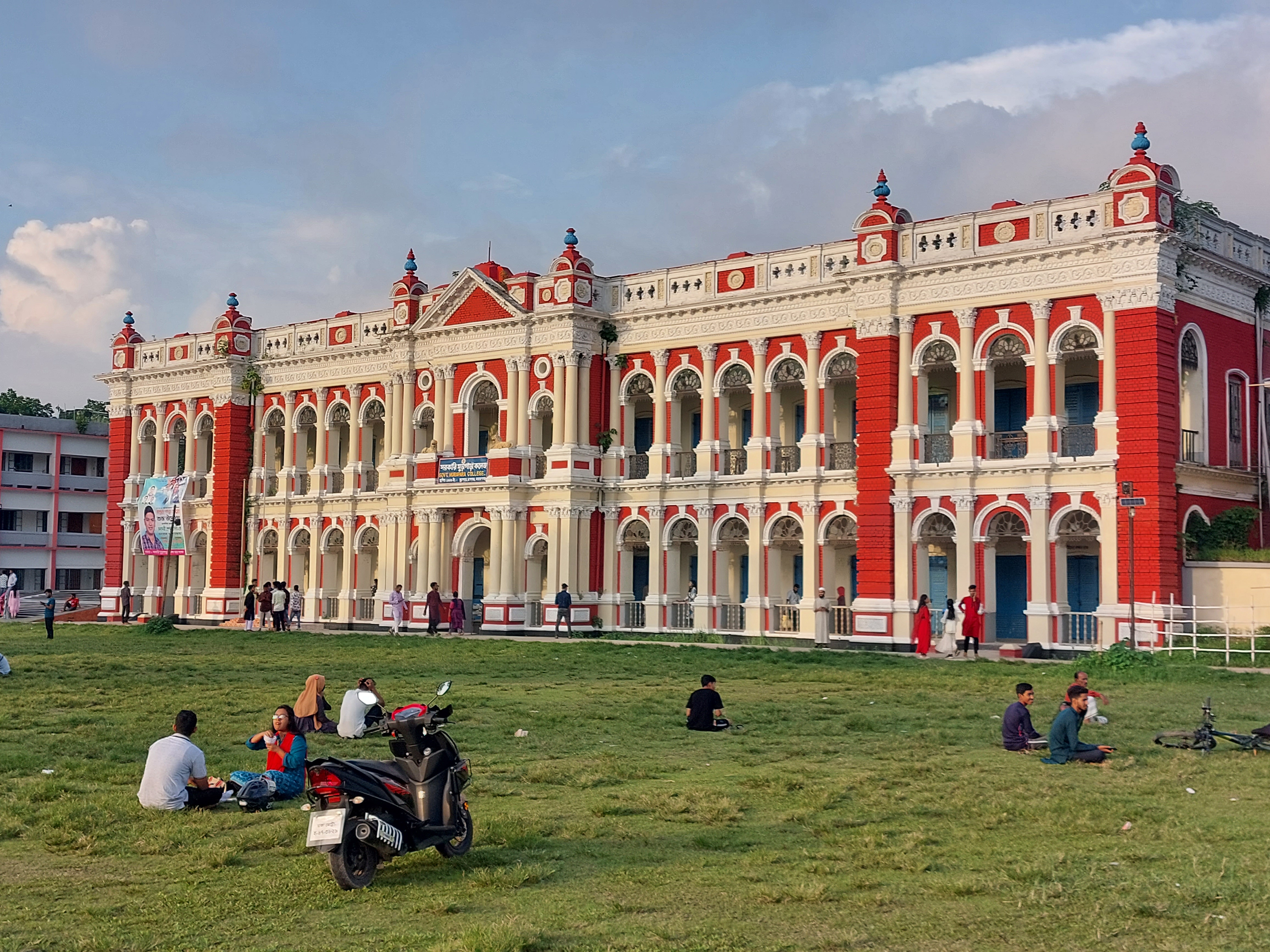
Murapara Rajbari in Rupganj Upazila of Narayanganj District

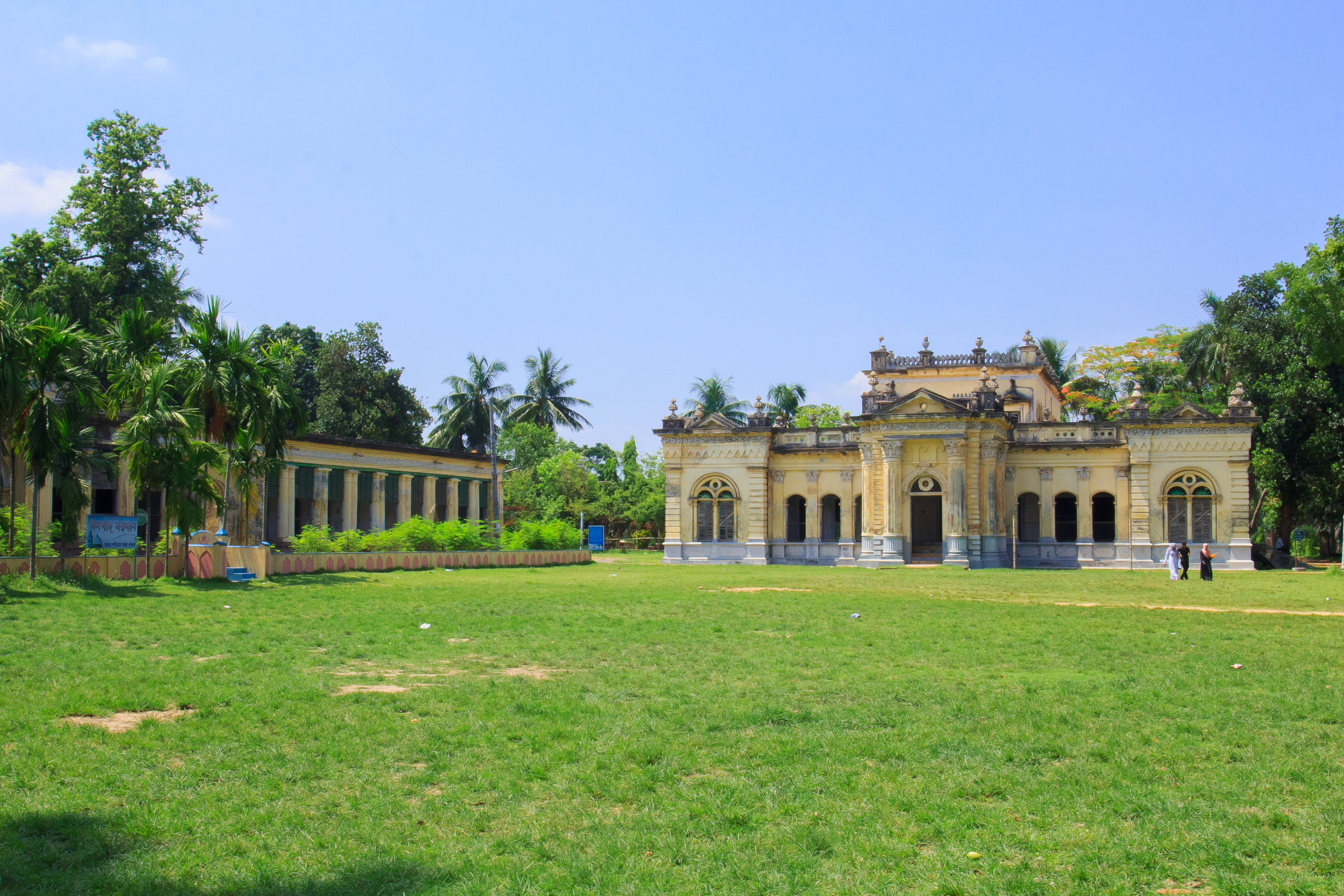
Natore Rajbari

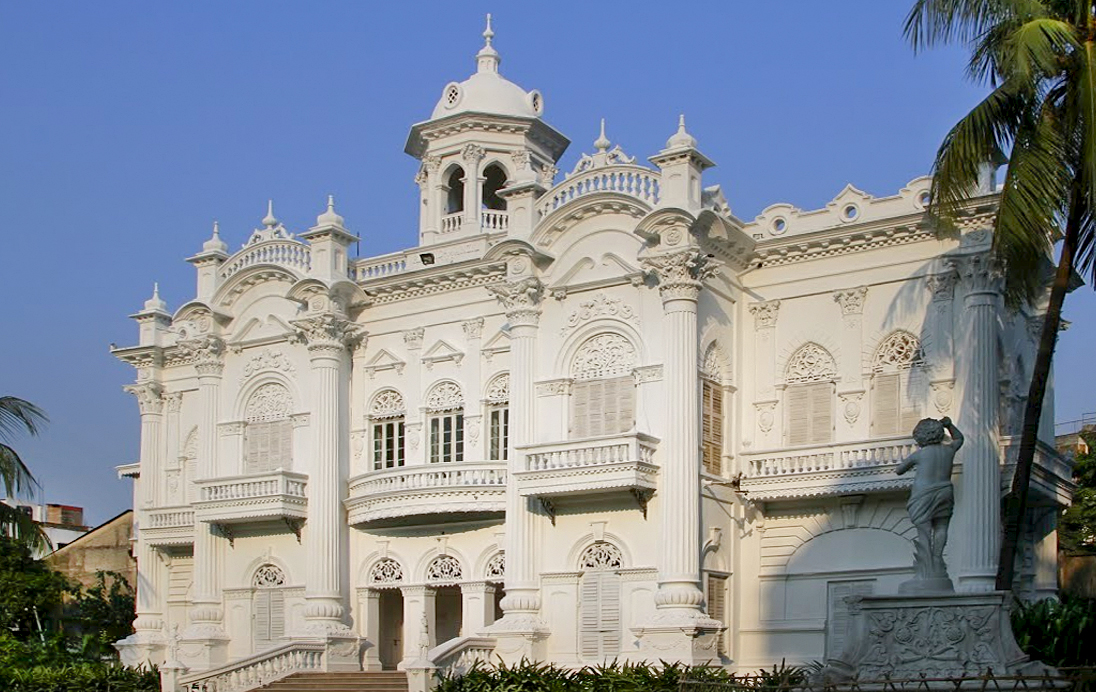
Rose Garden Palace

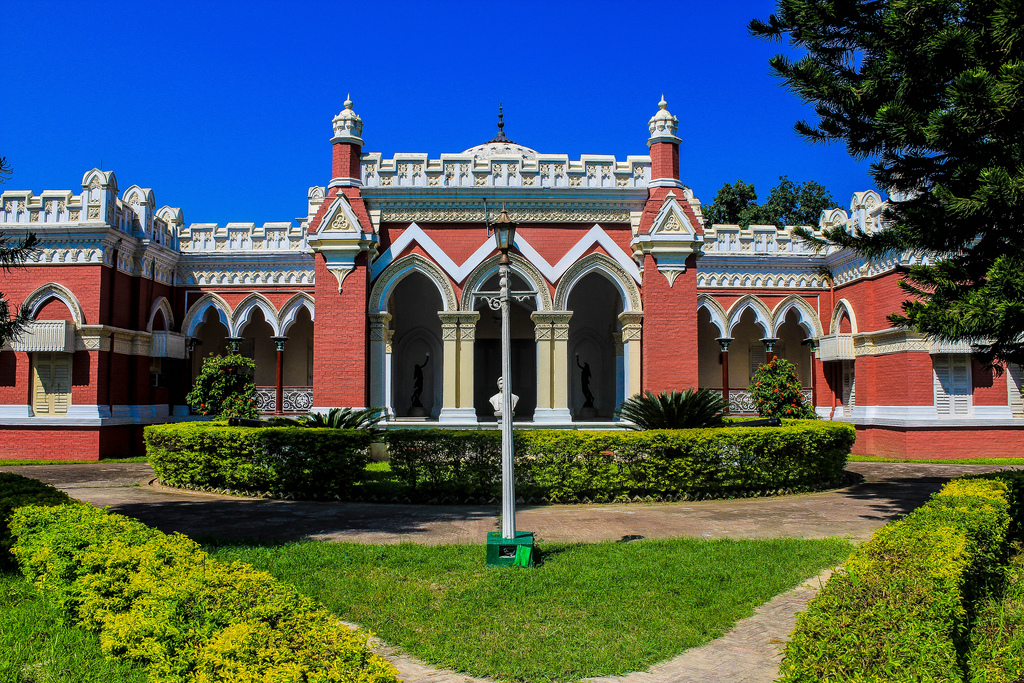
Uttara Gonobhaban

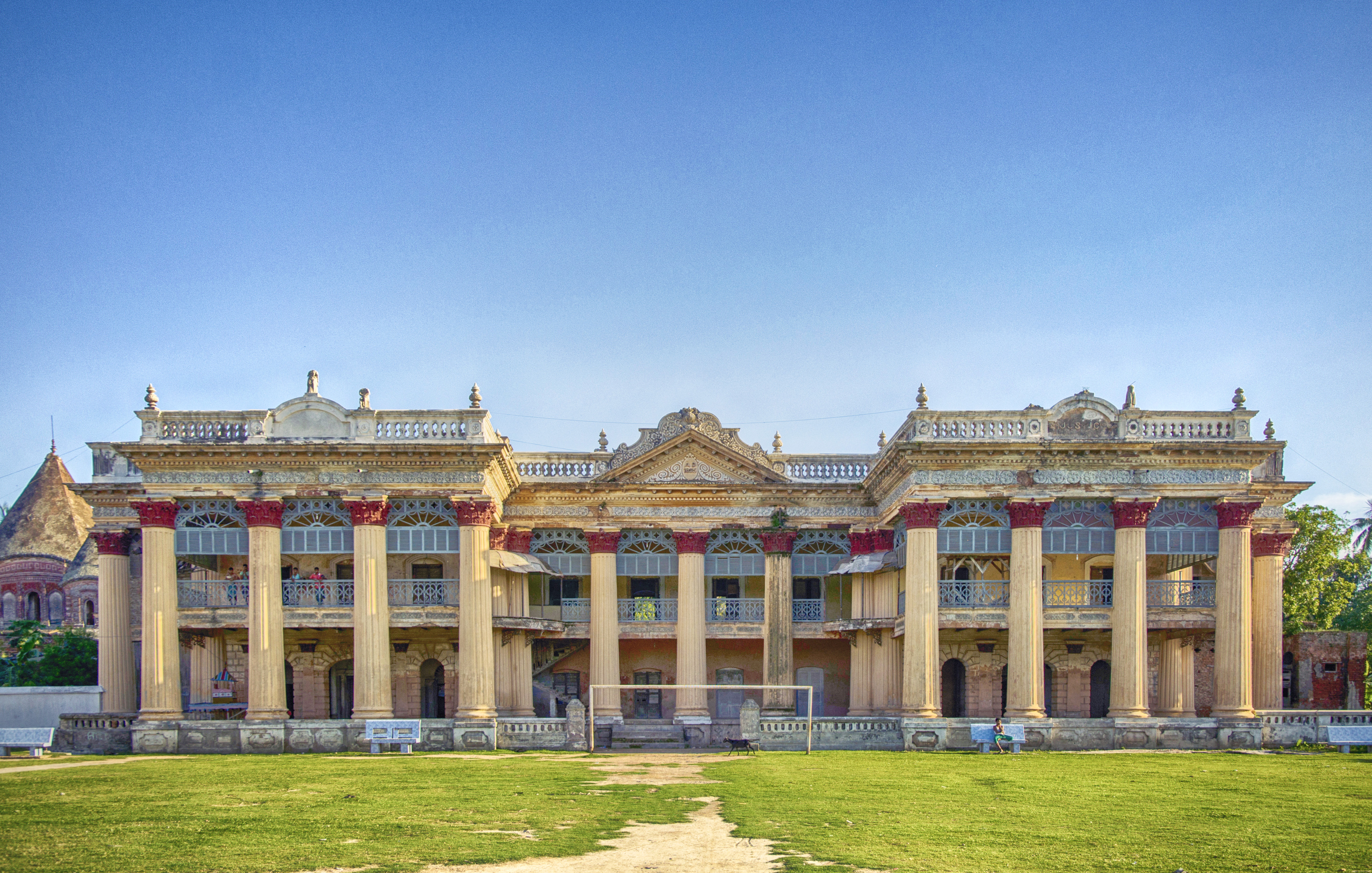
Puthia Rajbari

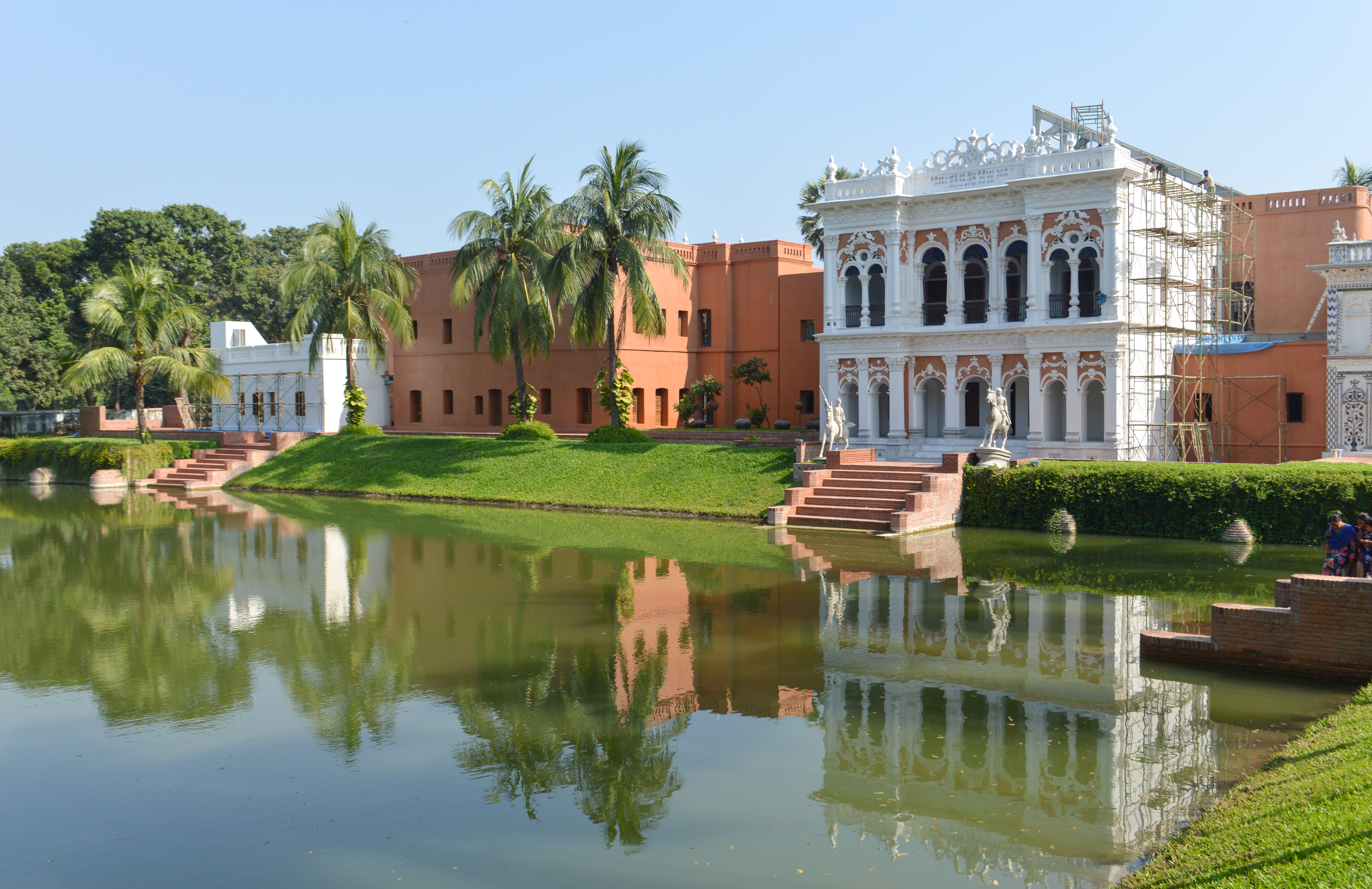
Bangladesh Folk Arts and Crafts Foundation

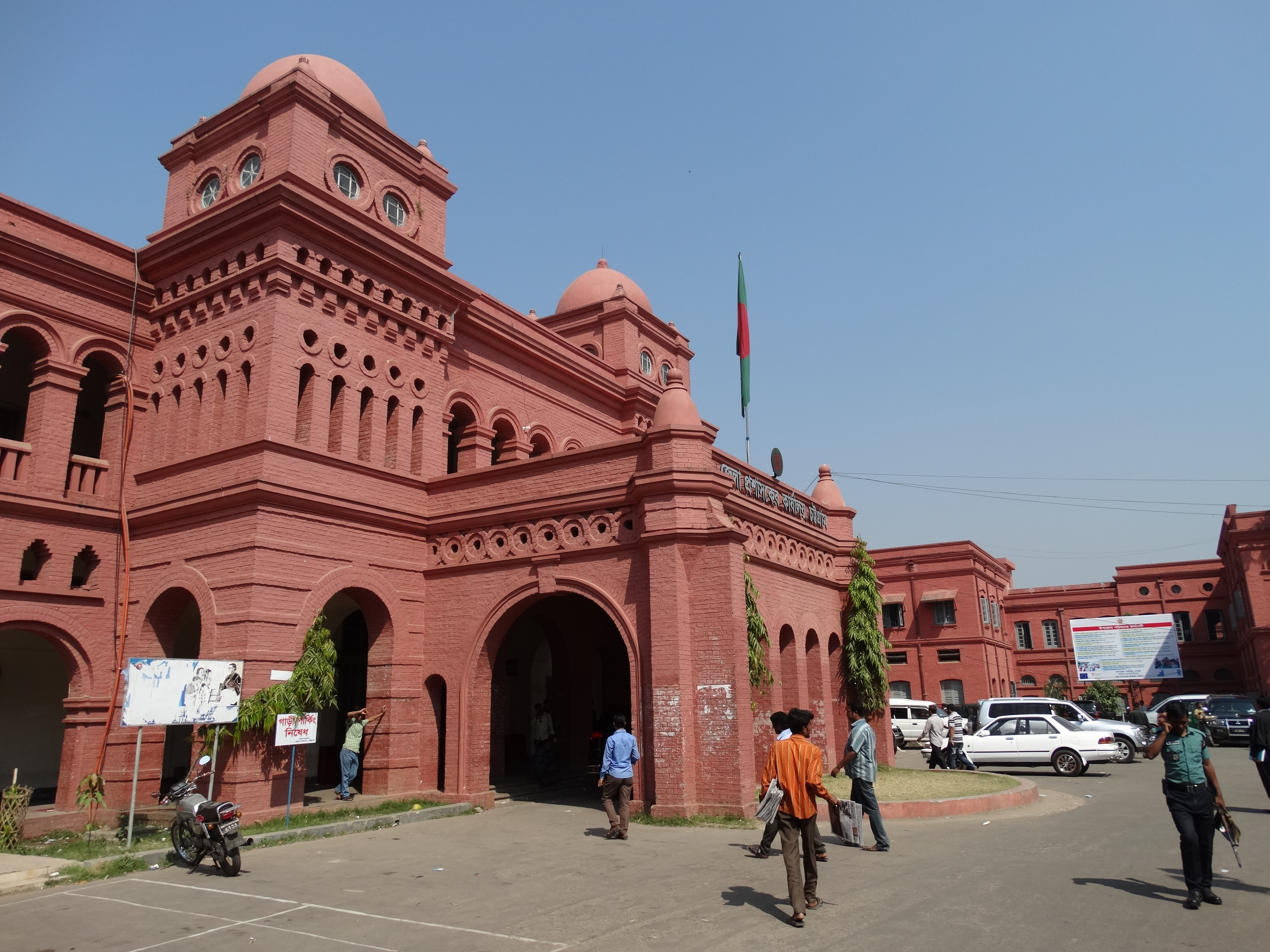
Chittagong Court Building

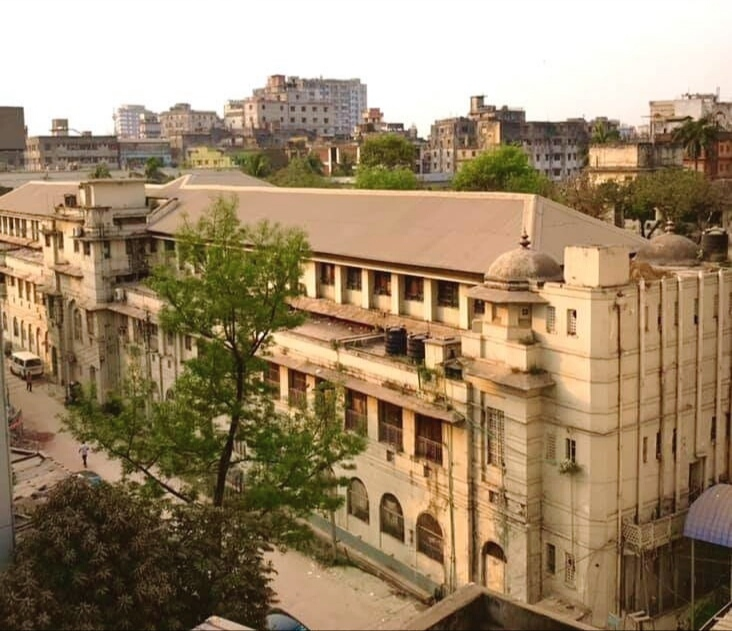
King Edward Building, Sir Salimullah Medical College

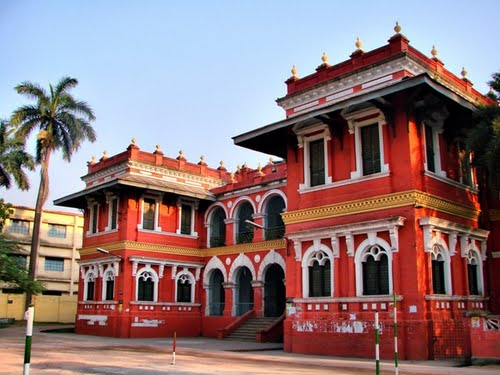
Rajshahi College

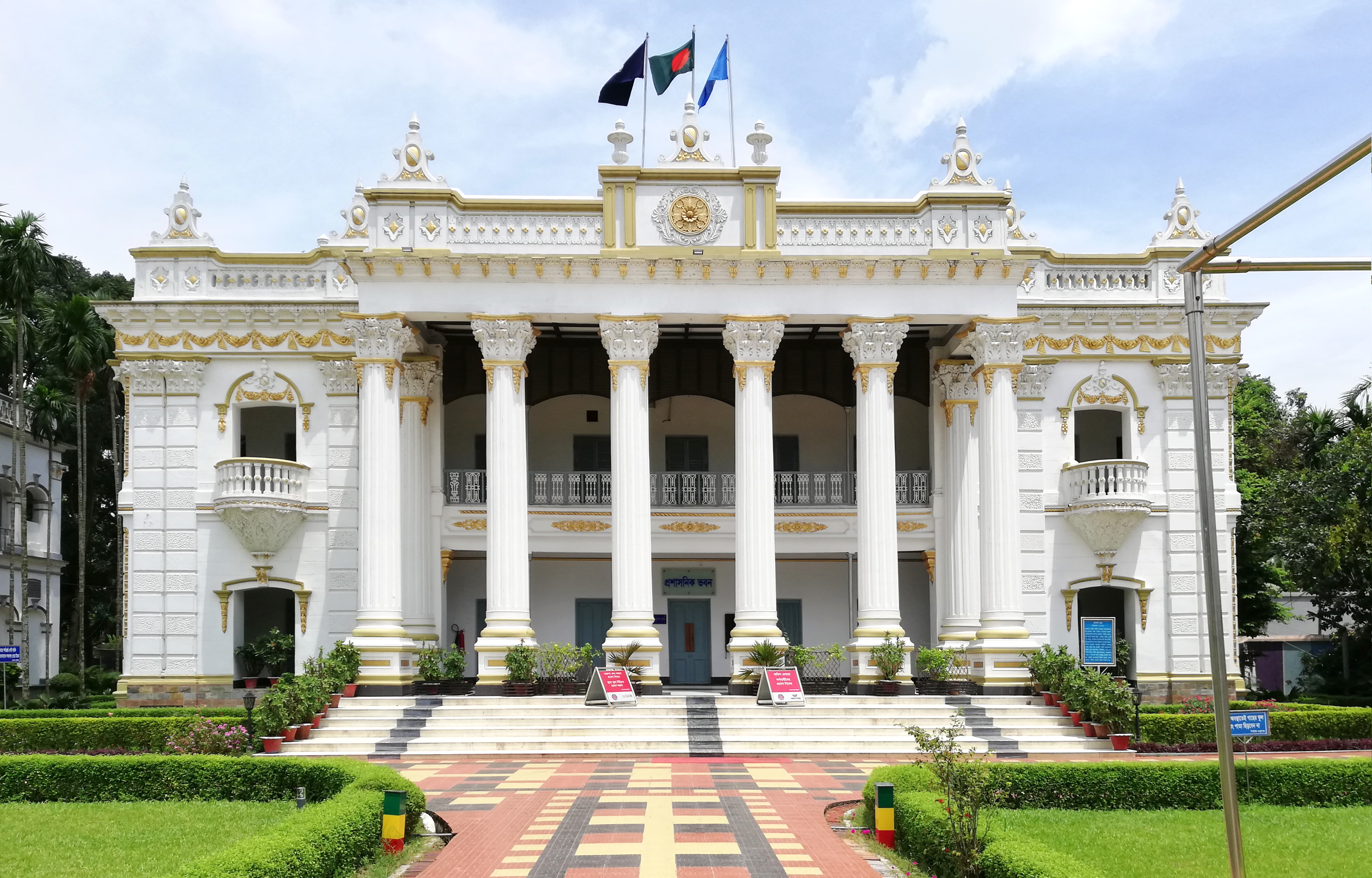
Mohera Zamindar Bari, Tangail

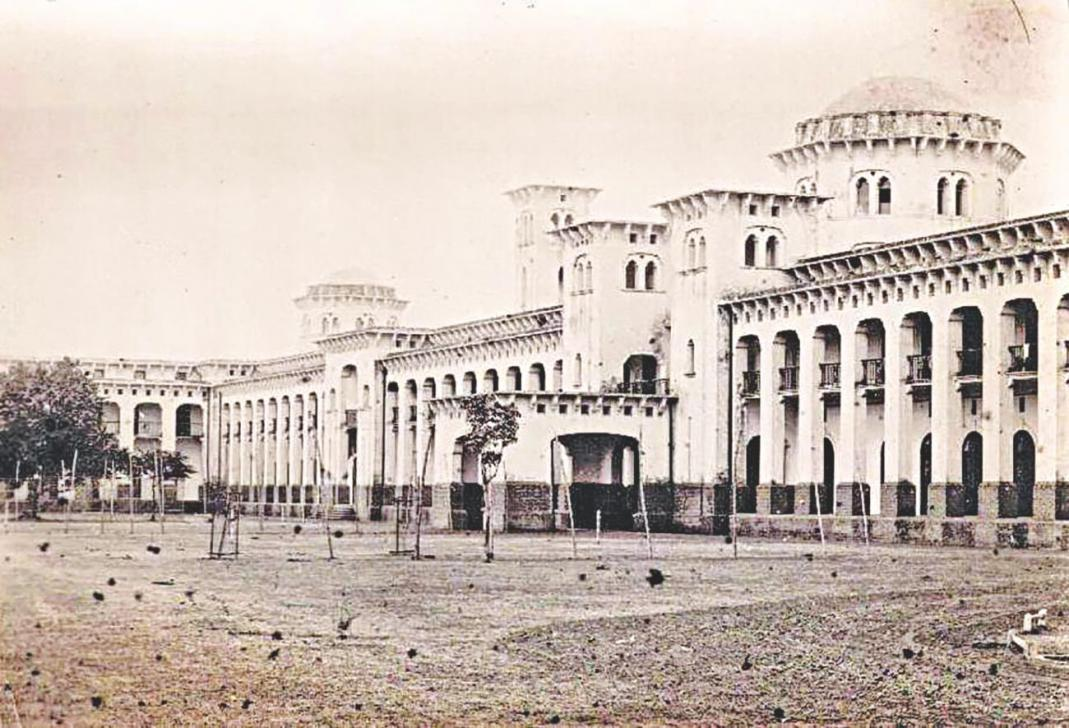
Dhaka Medical College

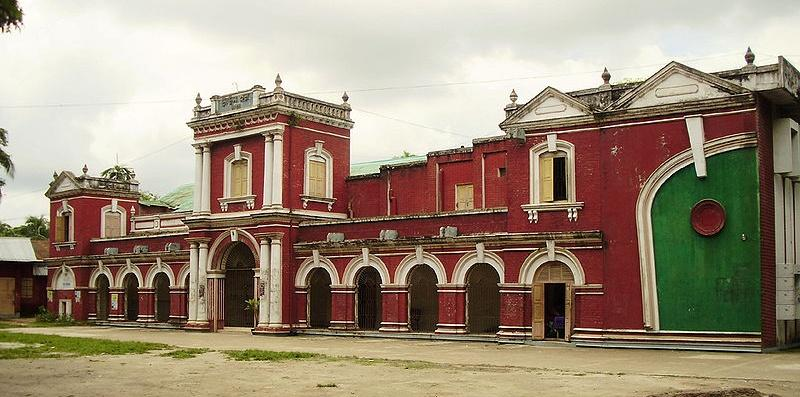
Rangpur Town Hall

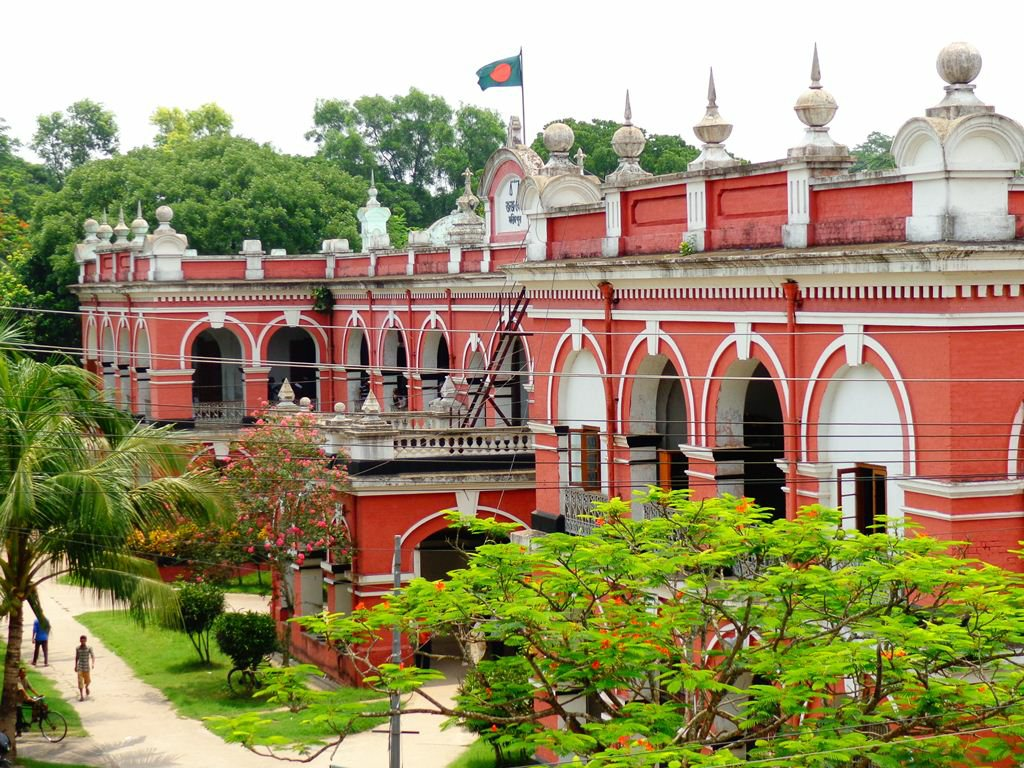
Judge Court, Faridpur

=== India ===
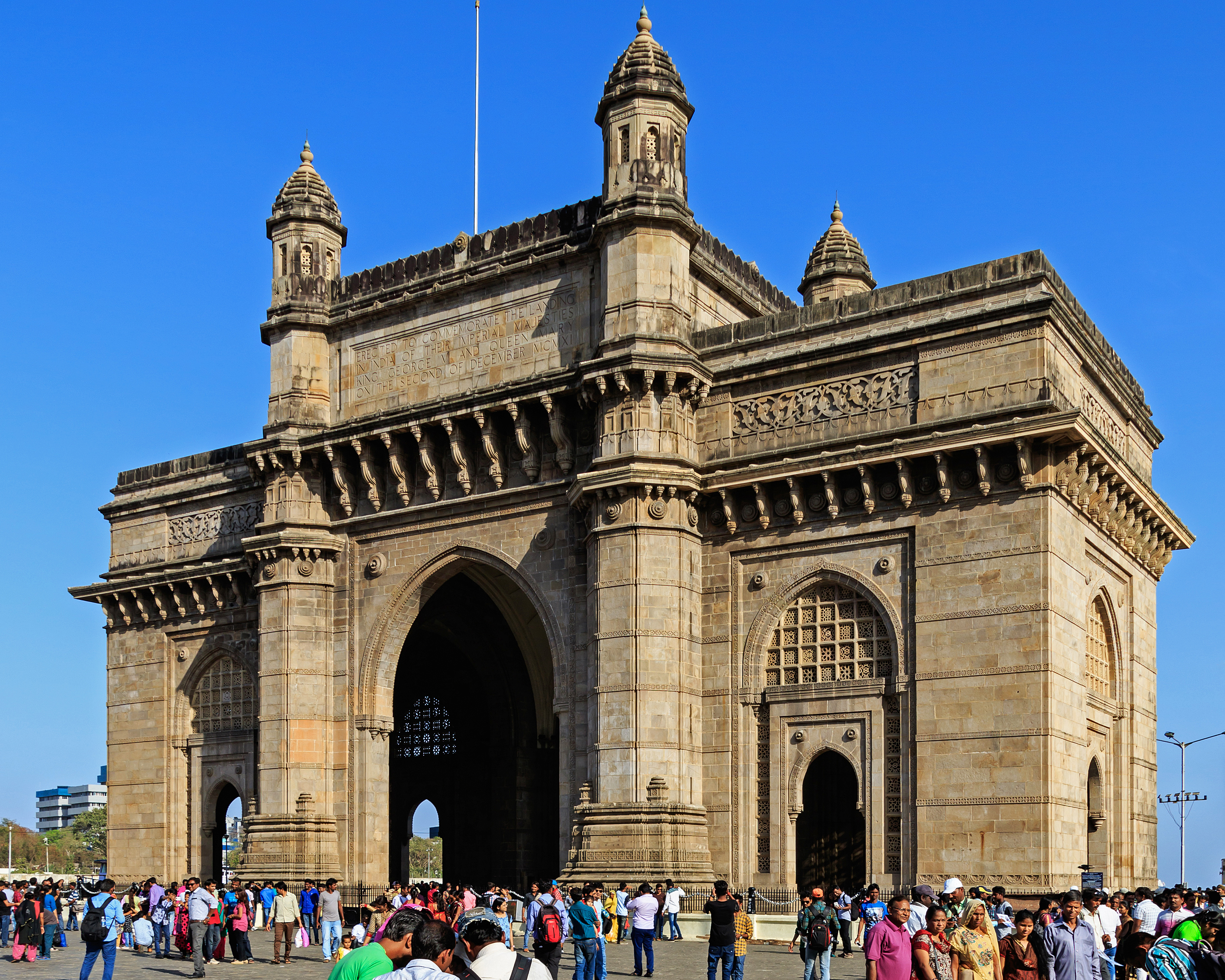
The Gateway of India

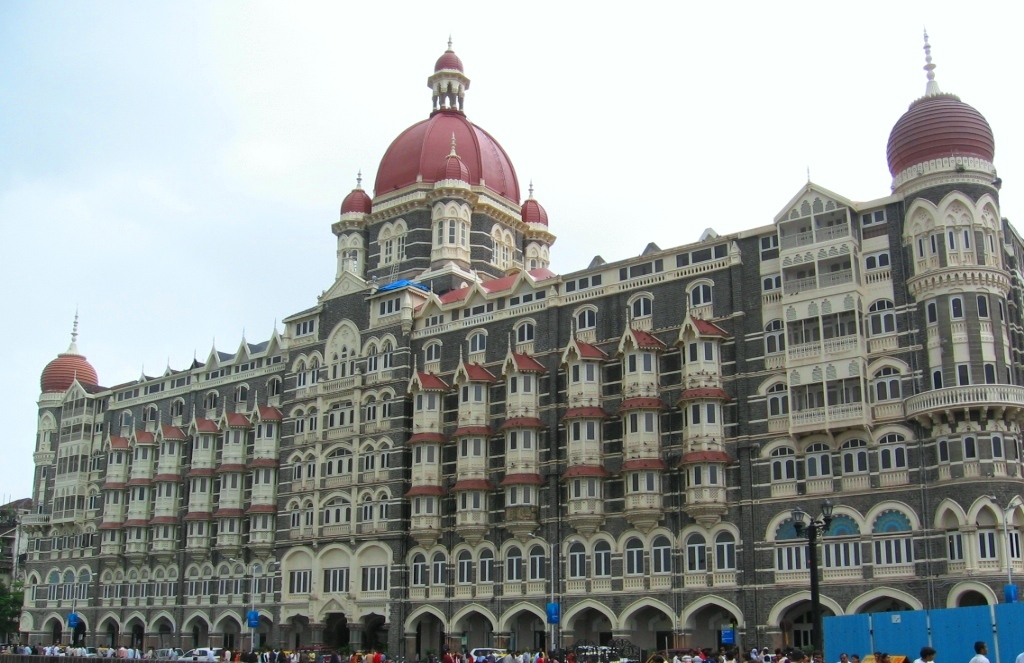
The Taj Mahal Palace Hotel in Mumbai

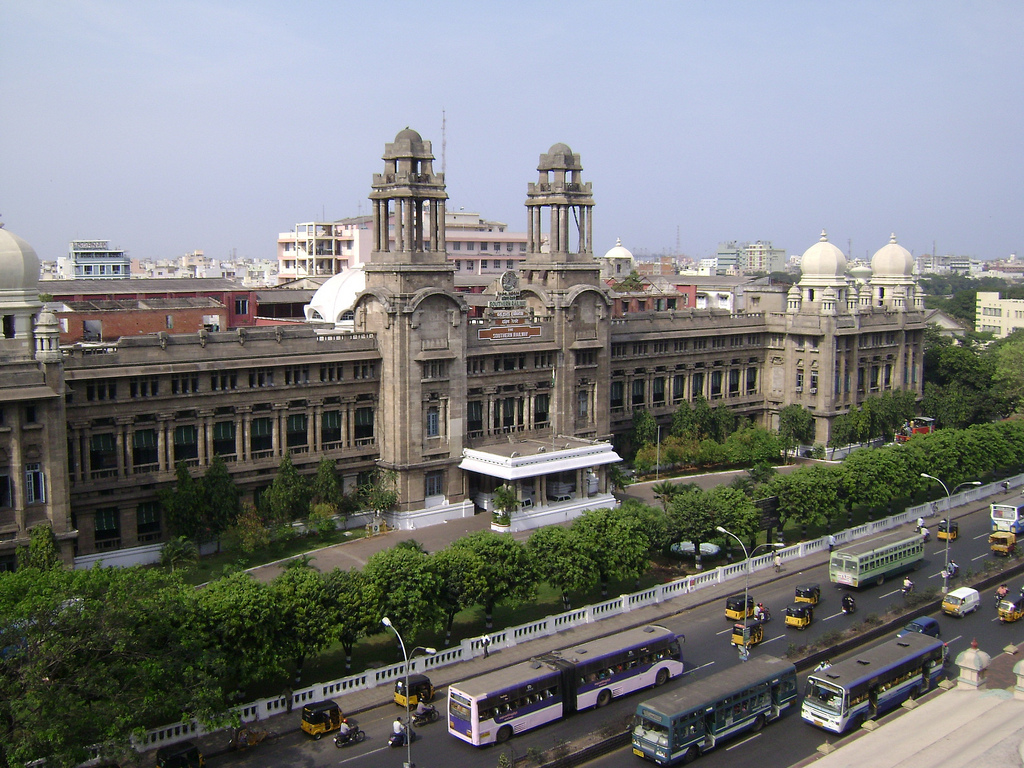
Southern Railway Headquarters, Chennai

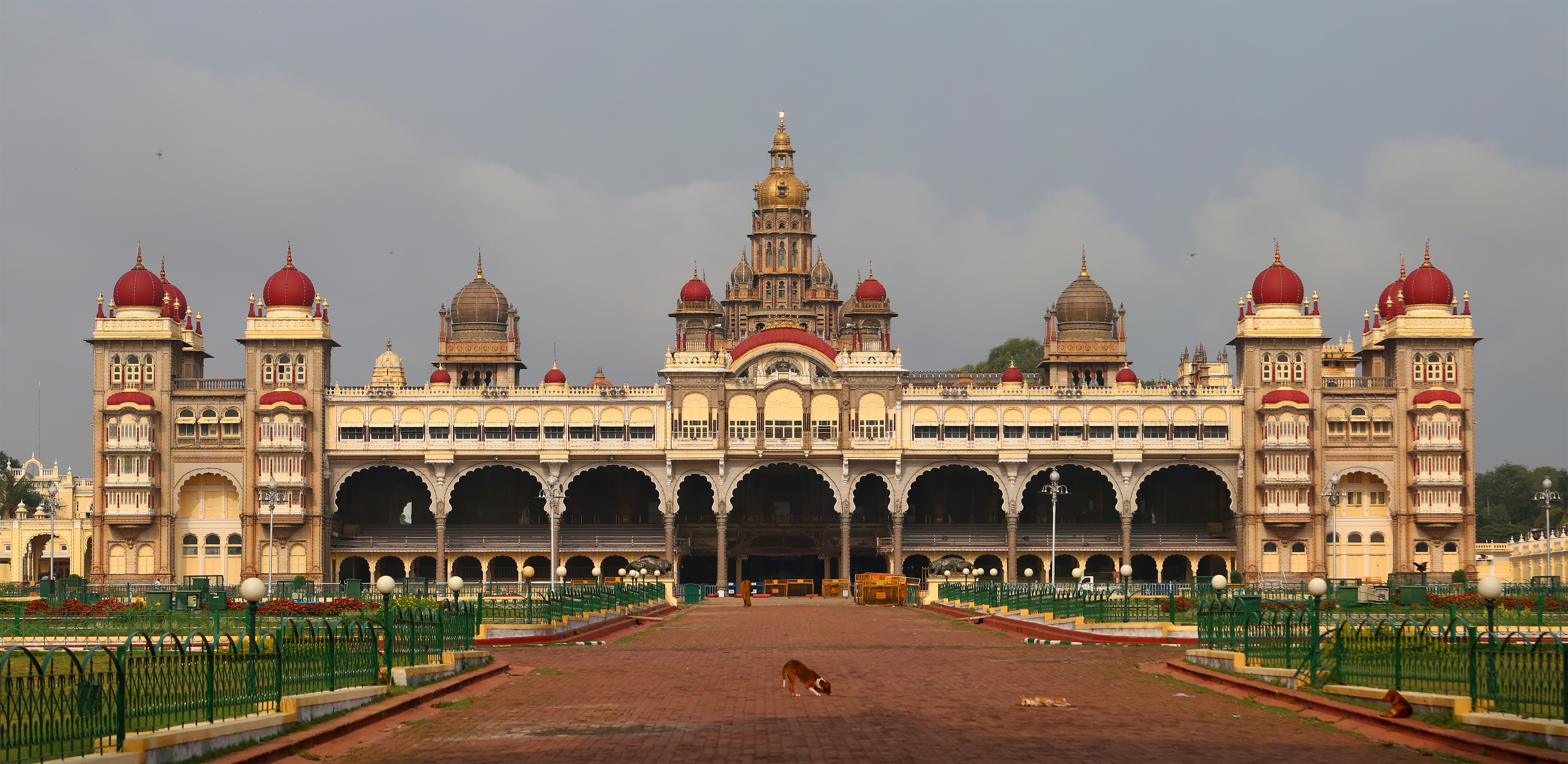
Mysore Palace

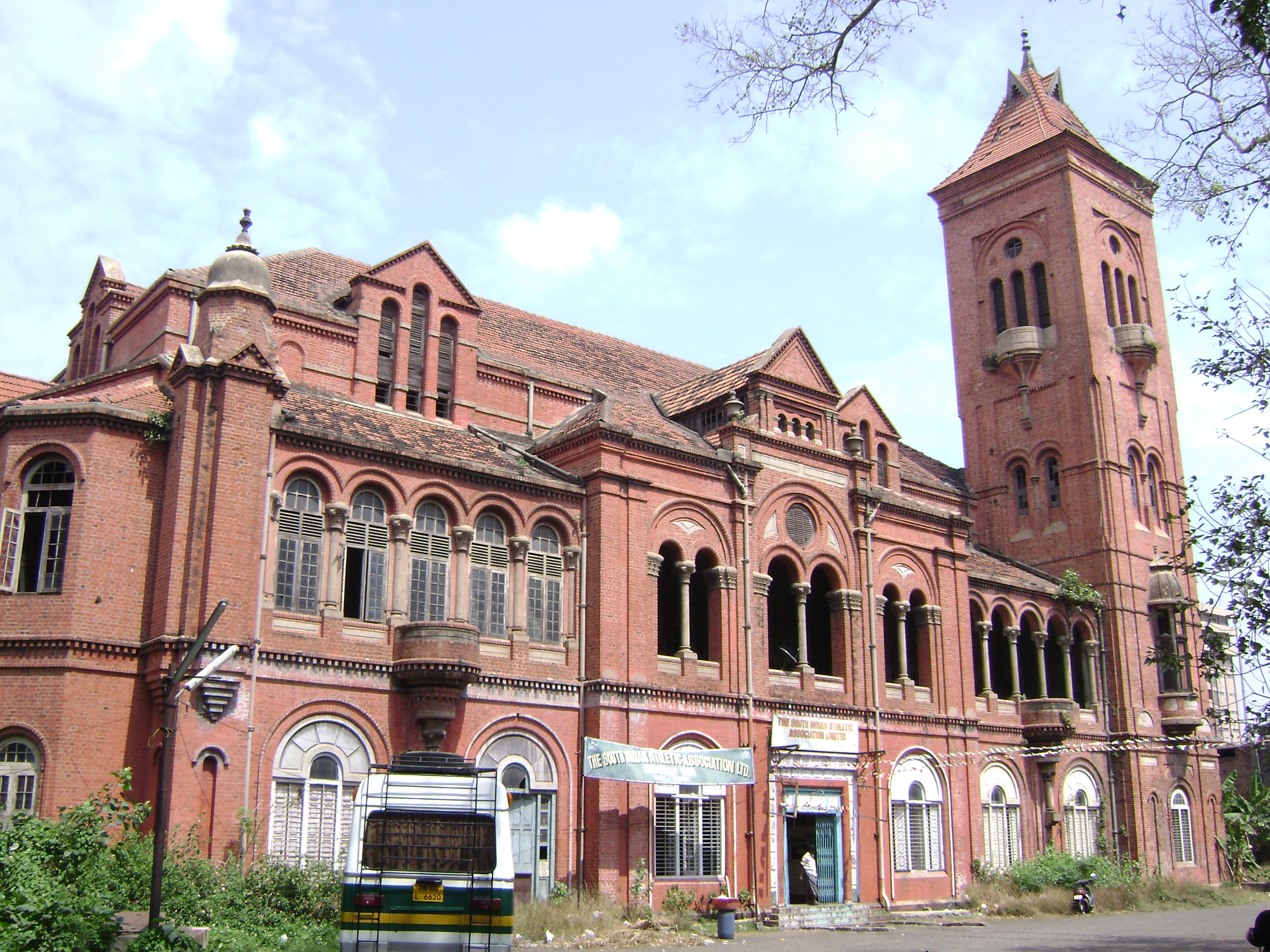
Victoria Public Hall in Chennai

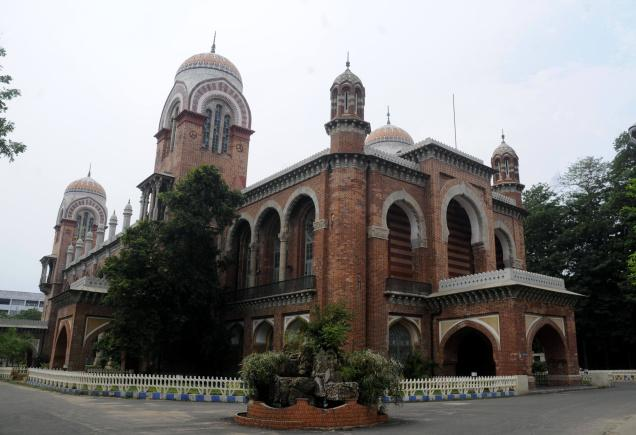
Senate House (University of Madras)

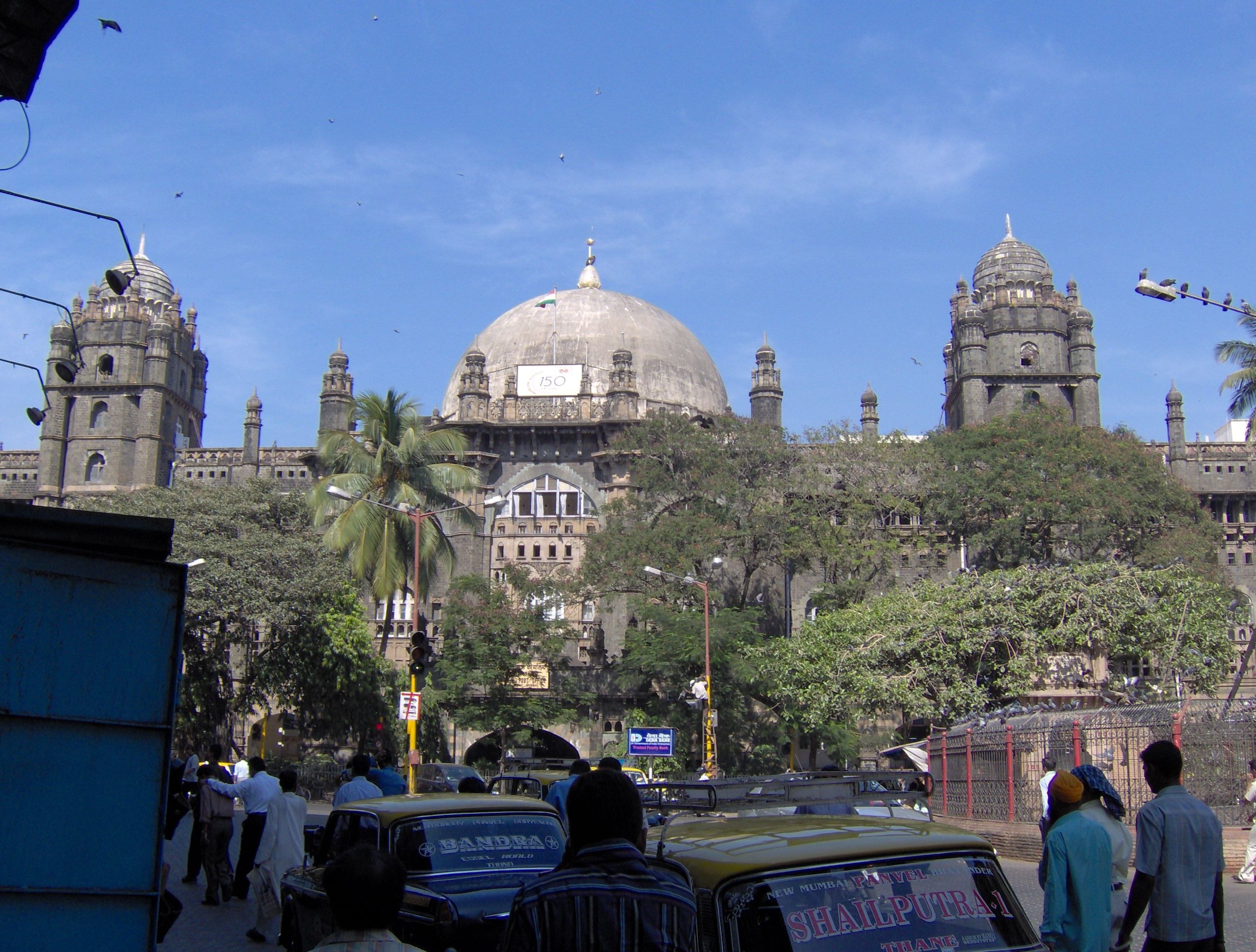
Mumbai GPO, reminiscent of the Gol Gumbaz

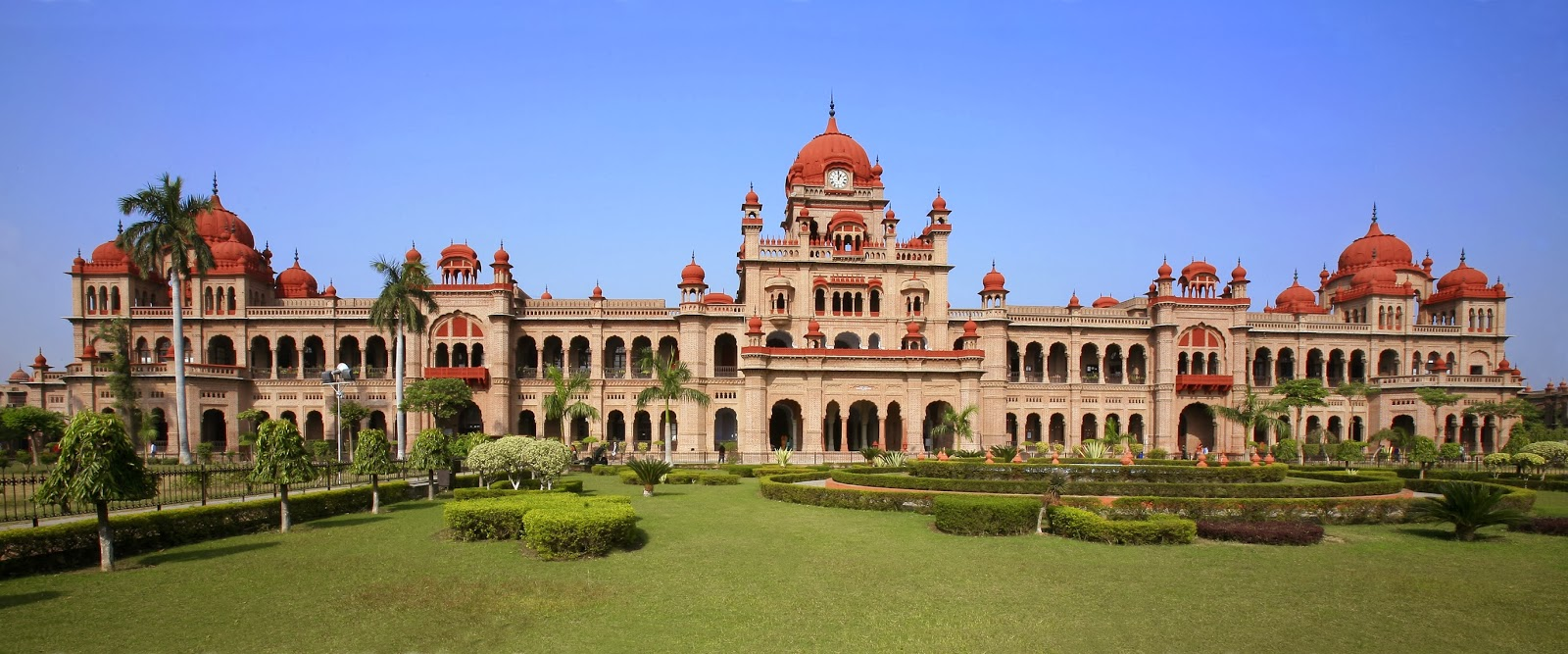
Khalsa College, Amritsar

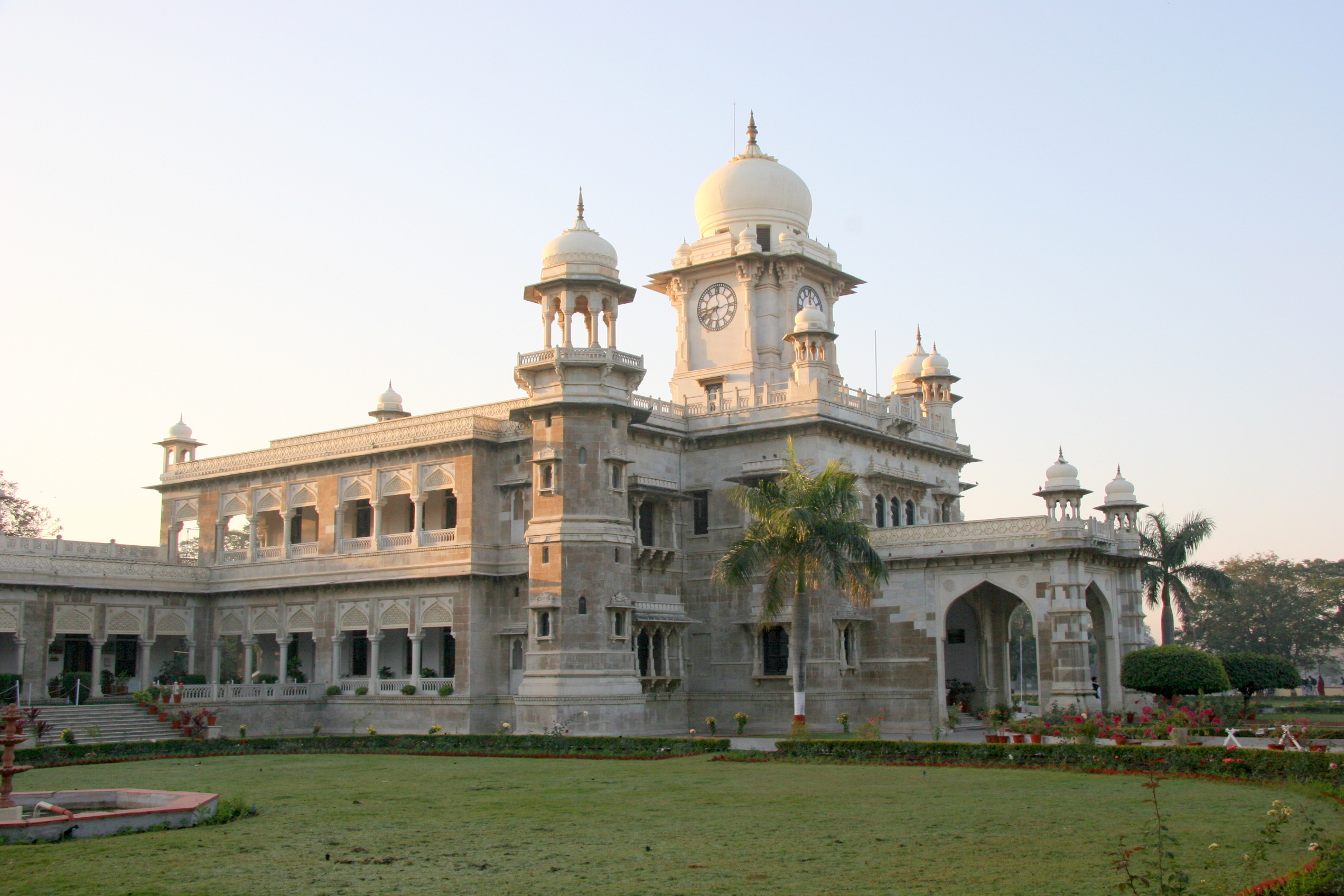
Daly College, Indore

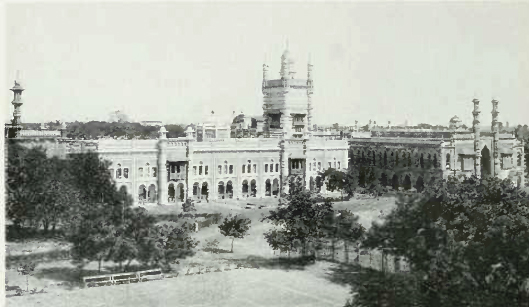
Chepauk Palace, Chennai

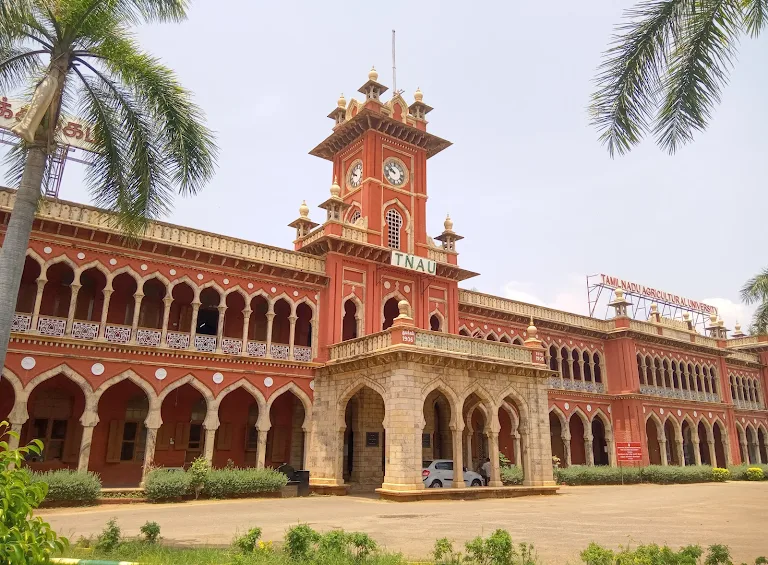
Tamil Nadu Agricultural University, Coimbatore

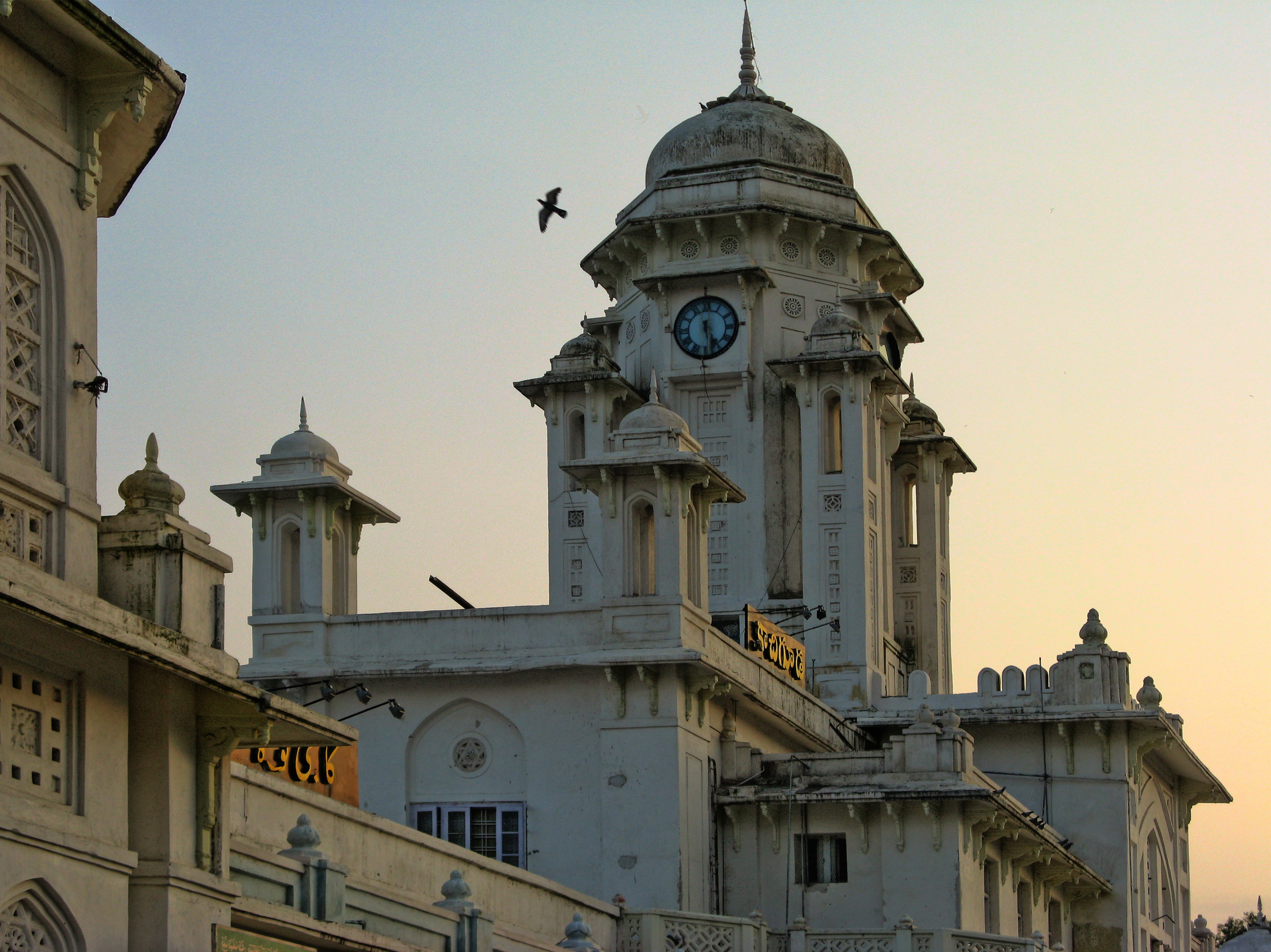
Kachiguda Railway Station, Hyderabad

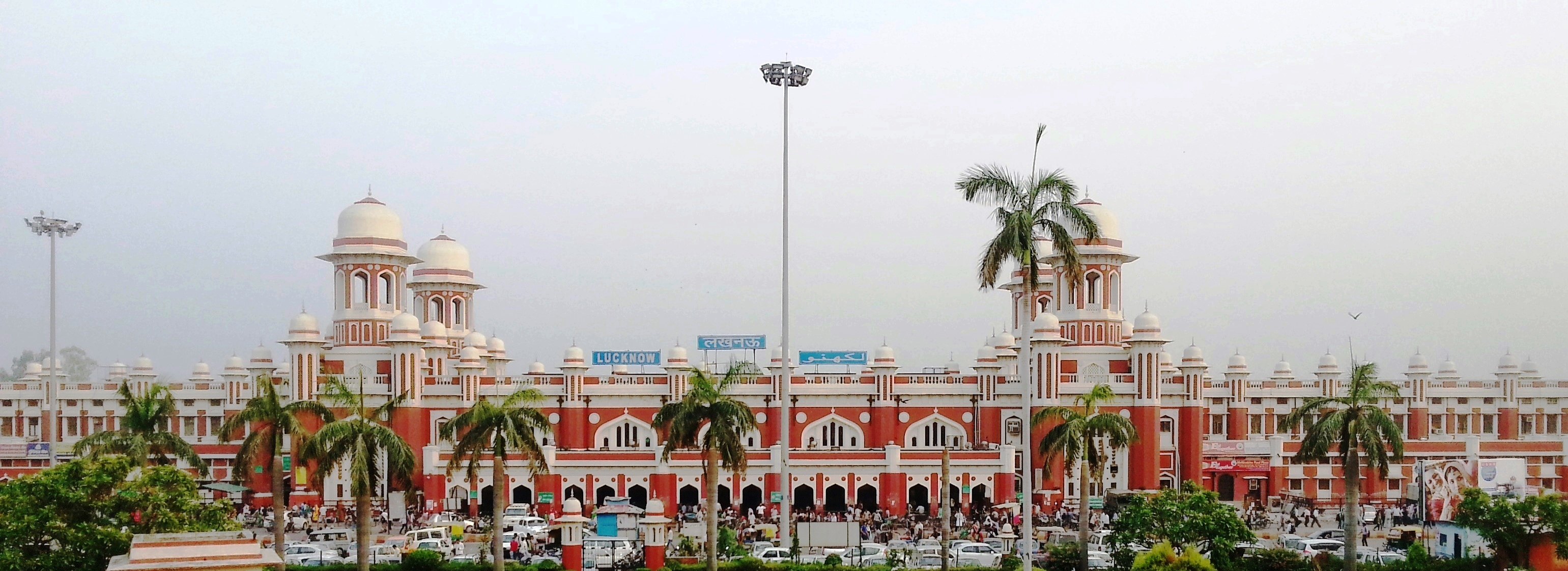
Lucknow Charbagh Railway Station

=== Pakistan ===
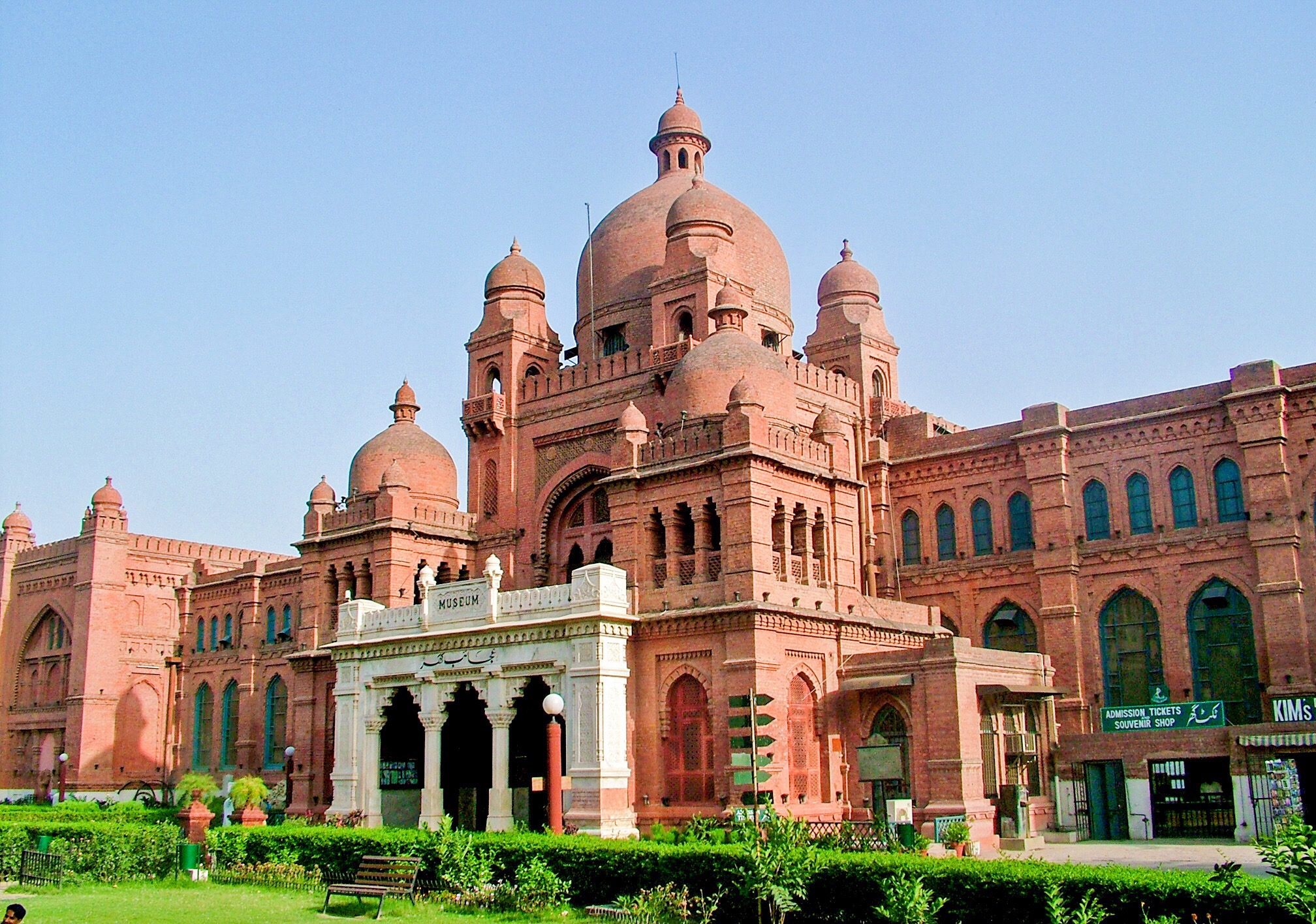
Lahore Museum, Lahore

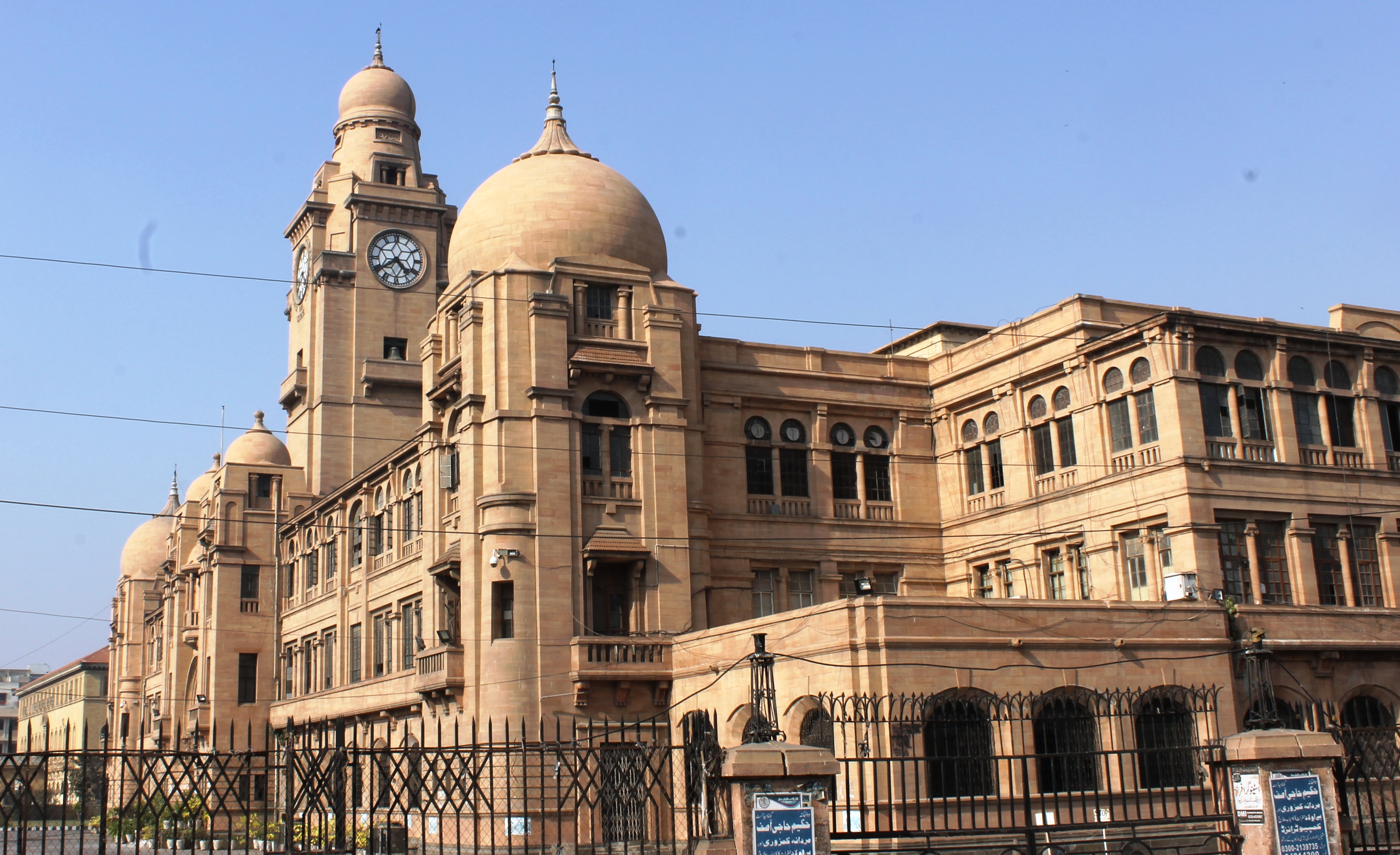
Karachi Metropolitan Corporation Building, Karachi, 1927–30

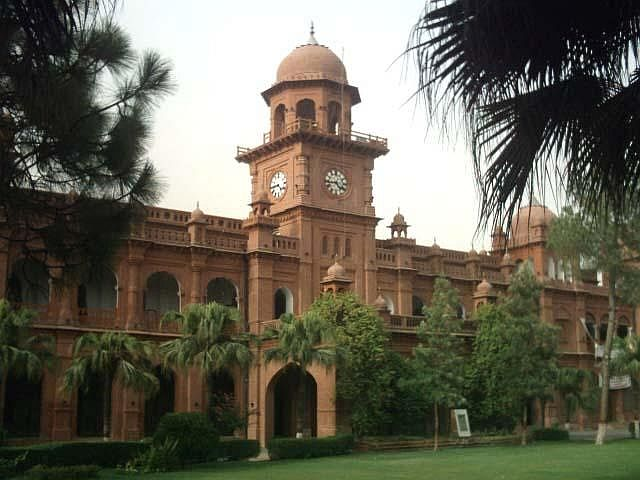
University of the Punjab, Lahore

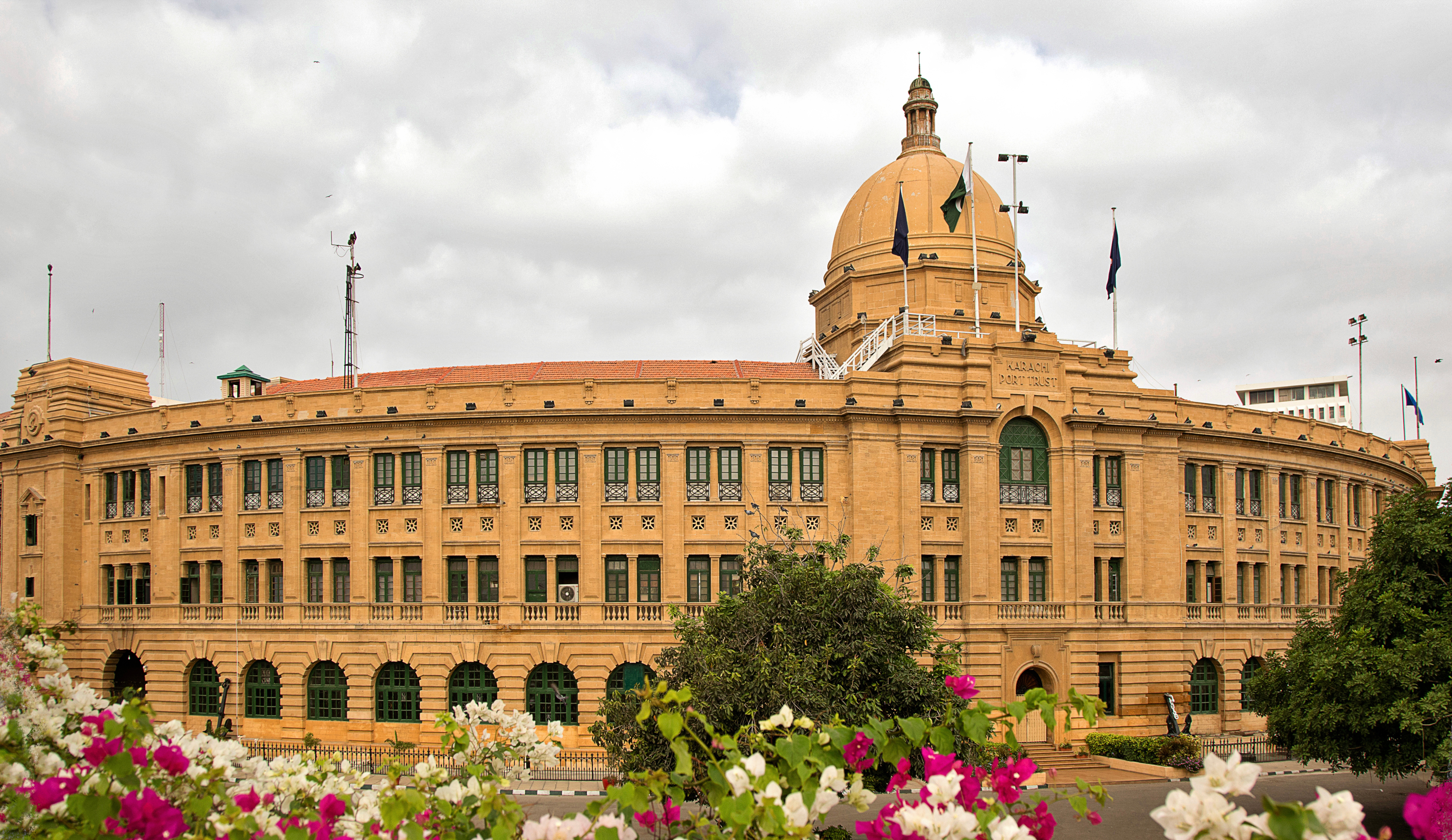
Karachi Port Trust Building, Karachi

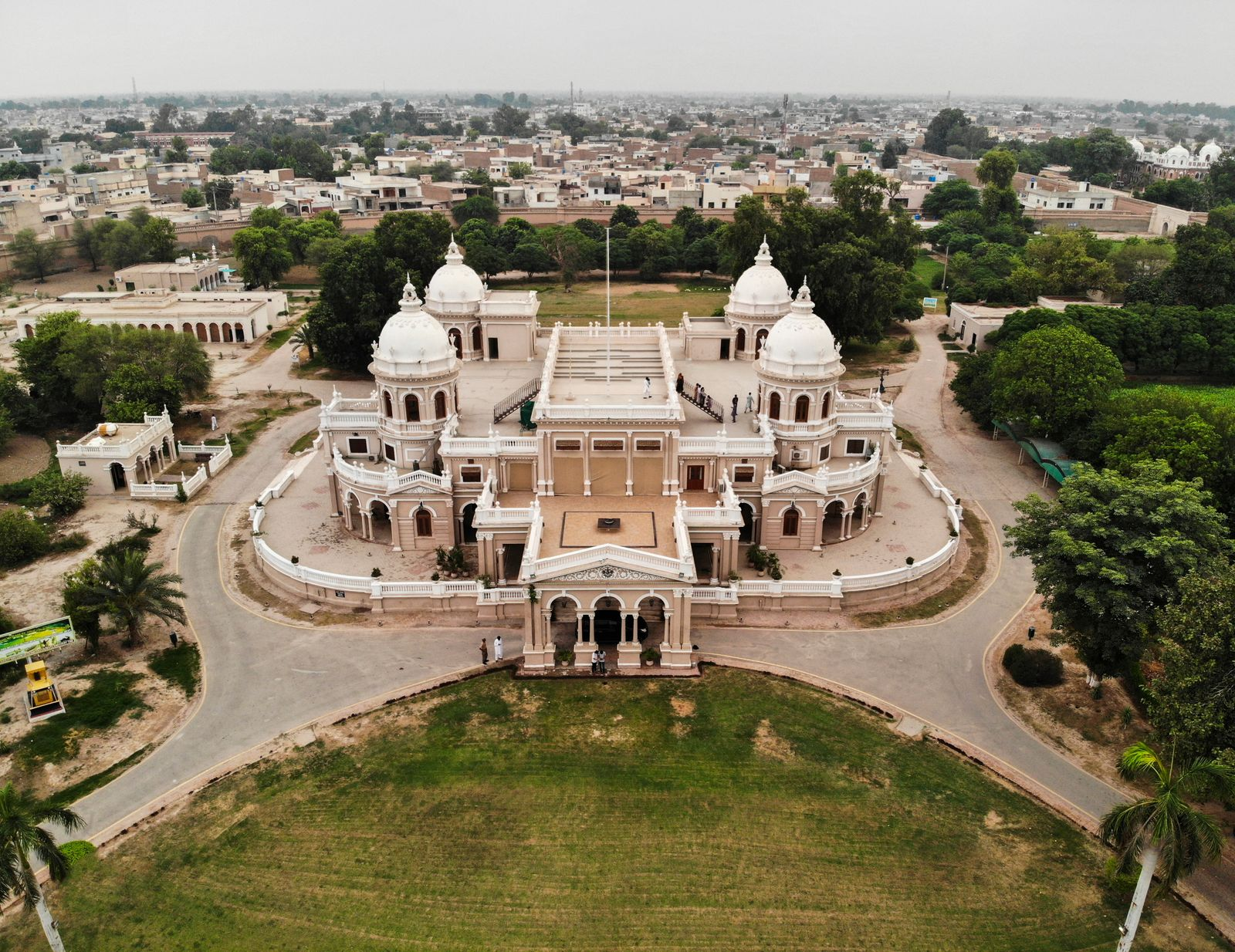
Gulzar Mahal, Bahawalpur

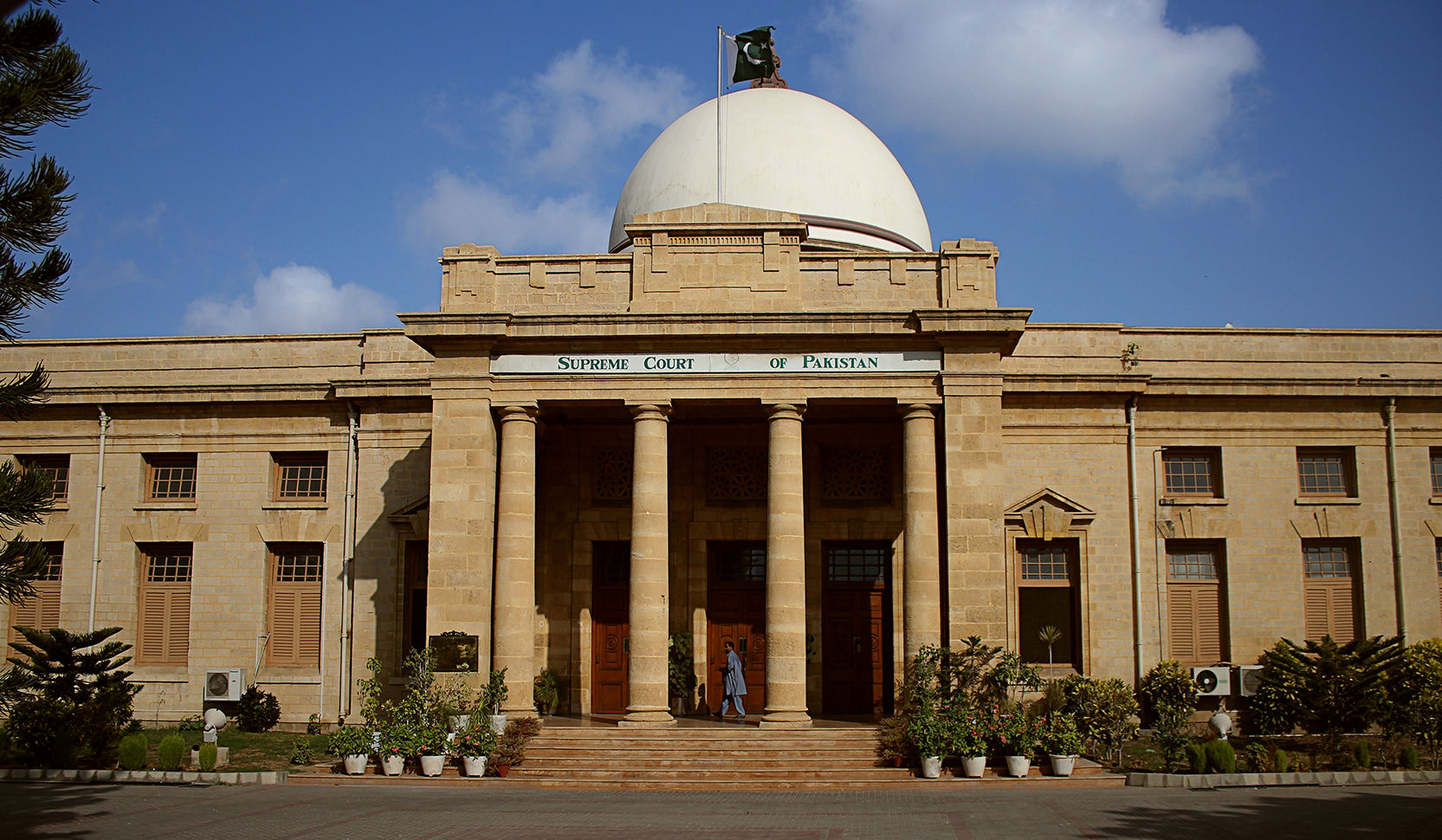
Supreme Court Registry, Karachi founded as Victoria and Albert Museum

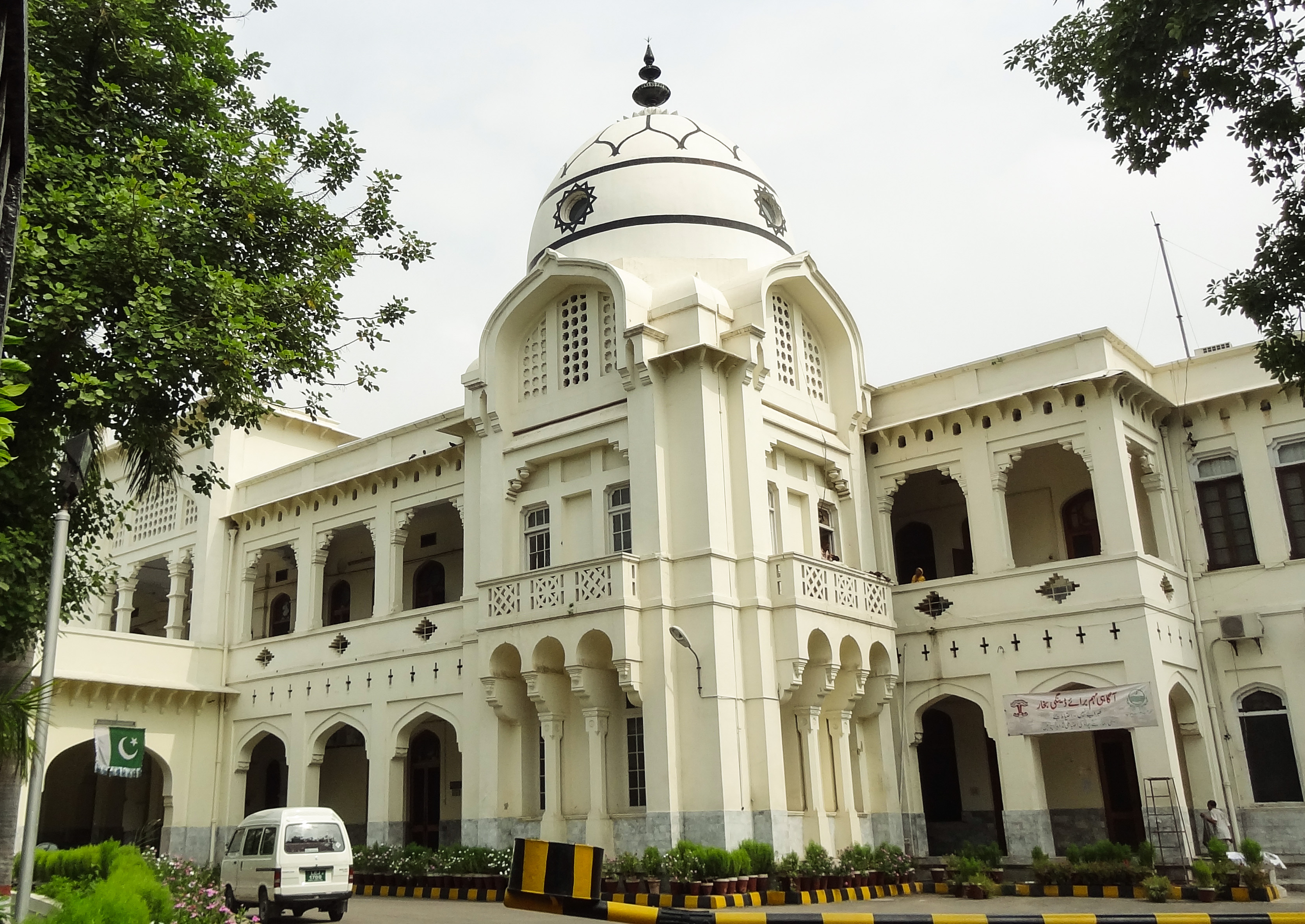
Patiala Block of King Edward Medical University, Lahore

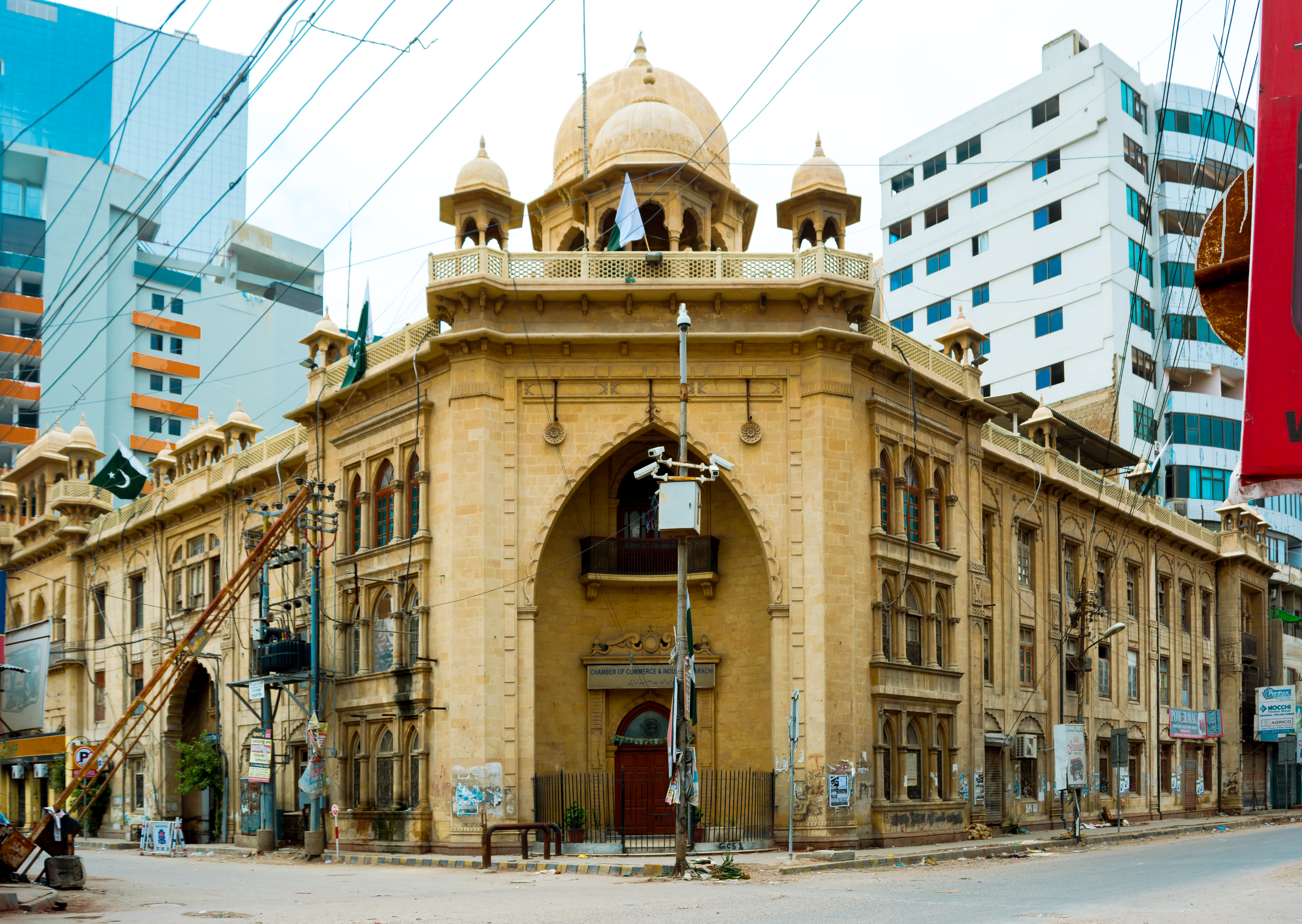
Karachi Chamber of Commerce Building

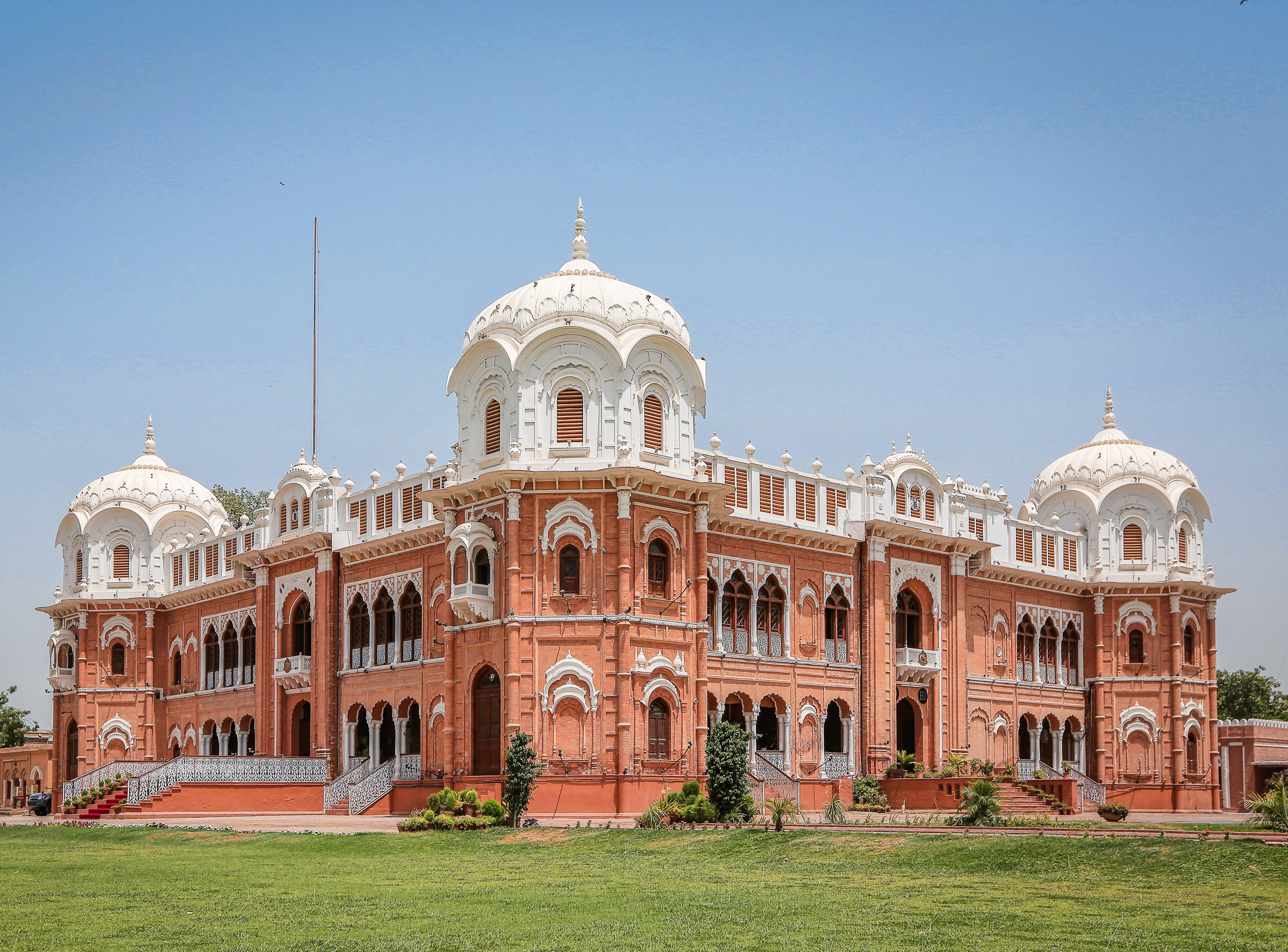
Darbar Mahal, Bahawalpur

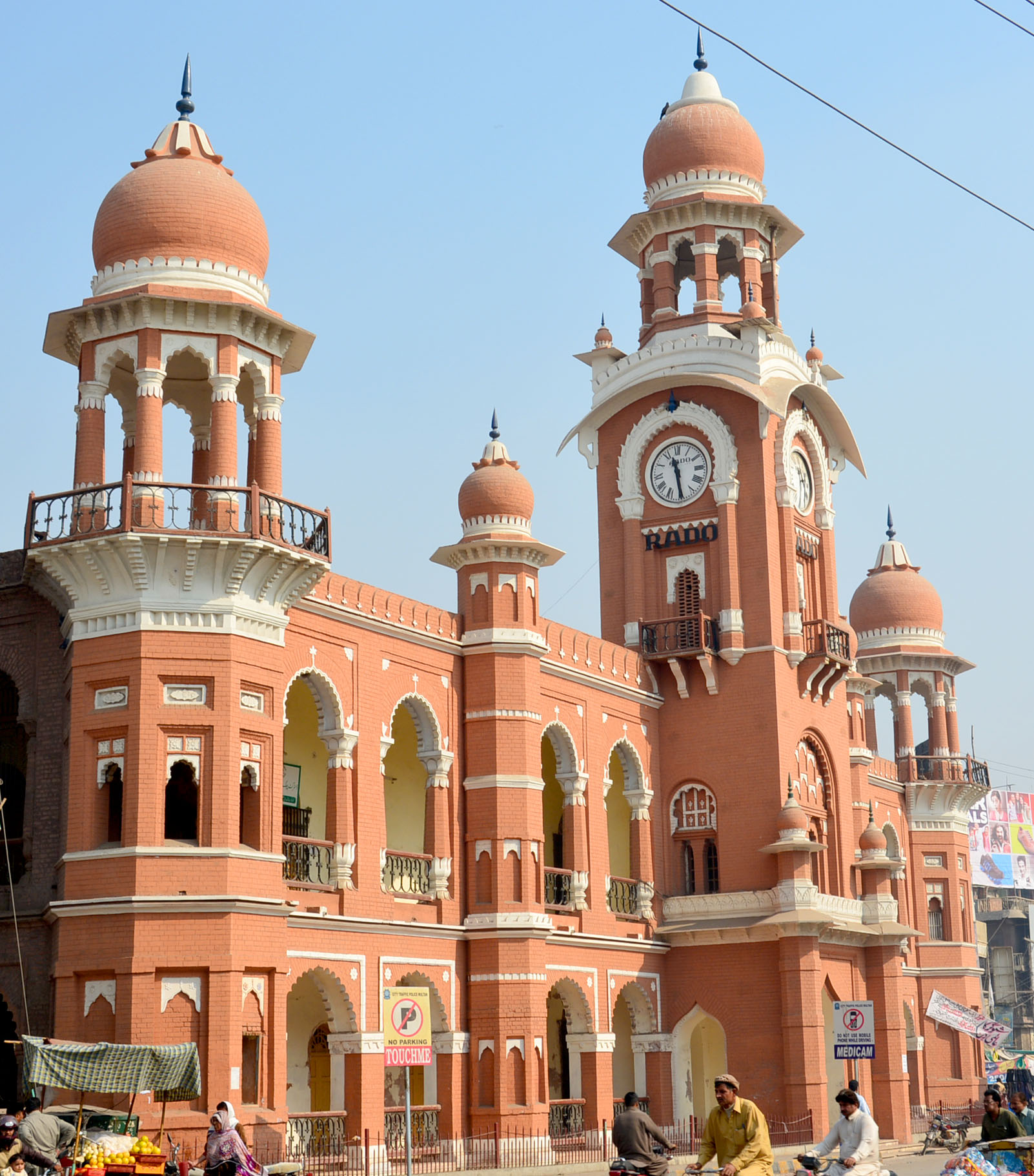
Multan Clock Tower, Multan

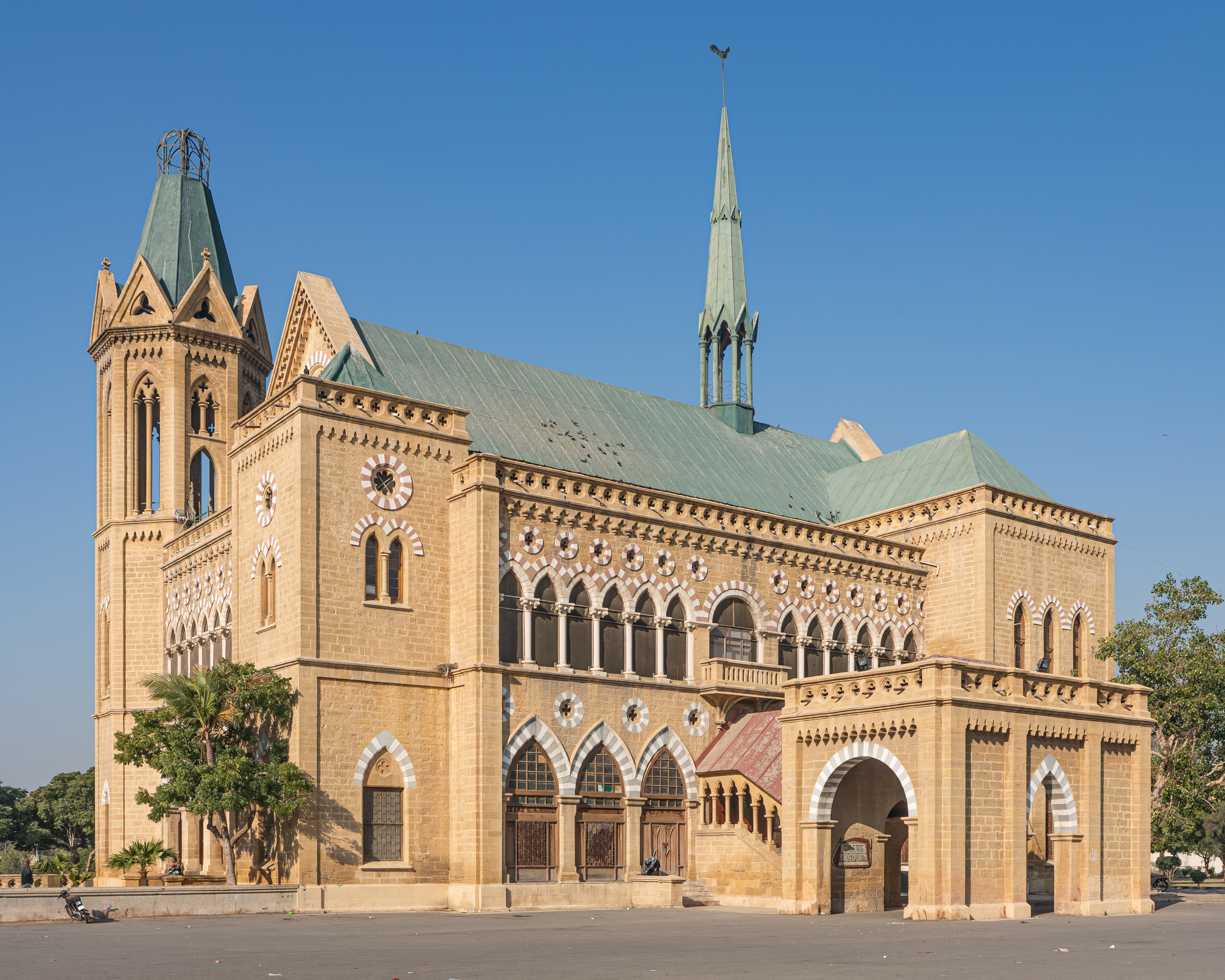
Frere Hall, Karachi

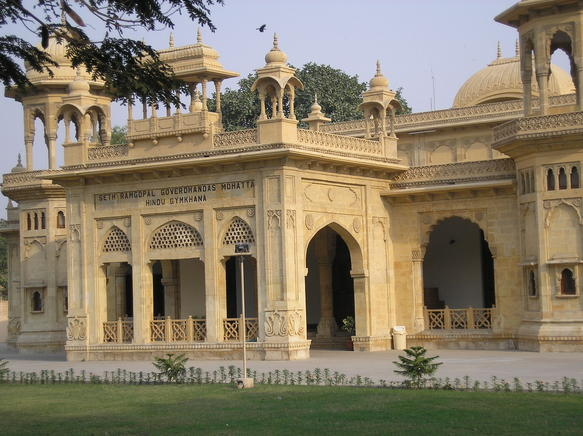
National Academy of Performing Arts, Karachi

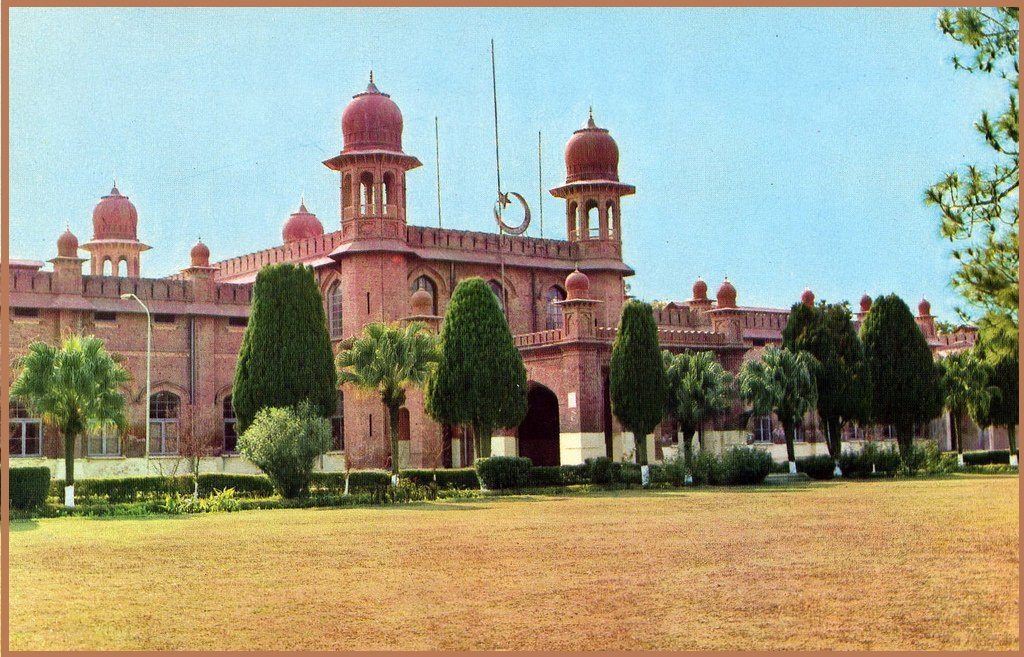
University of Agriculture, Faisalabad

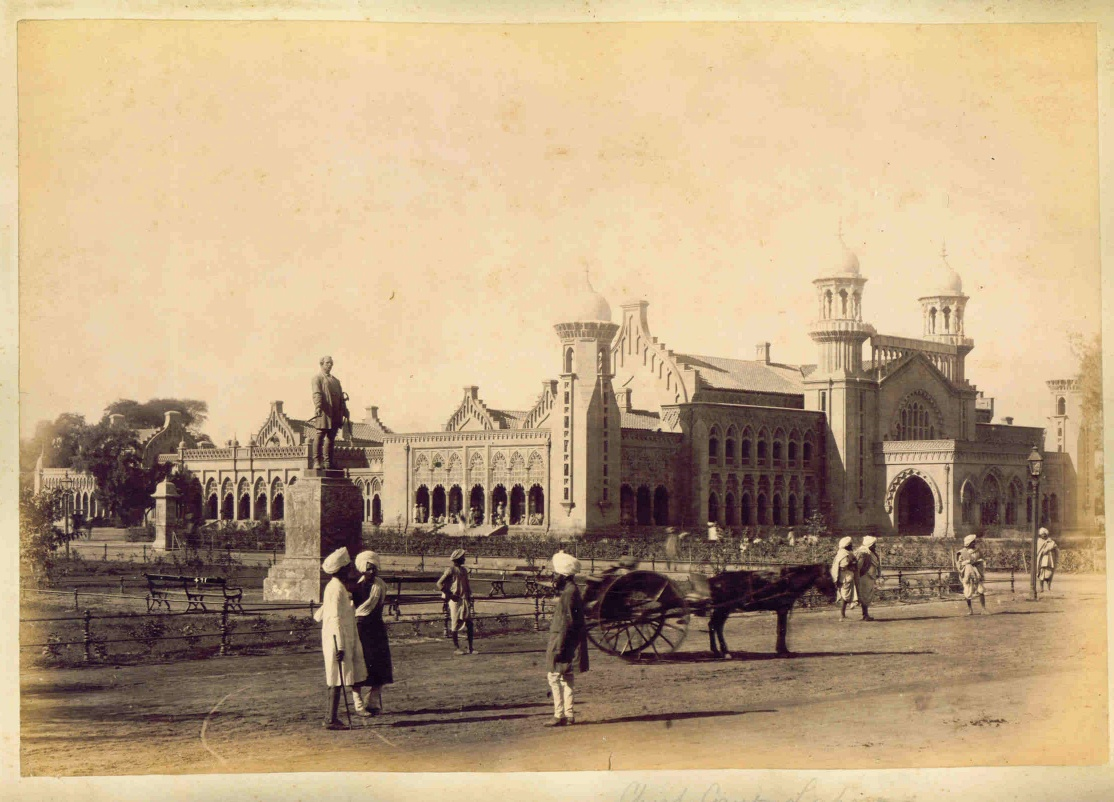
Lahore High Court, Lahore

=== United Kingdom ===
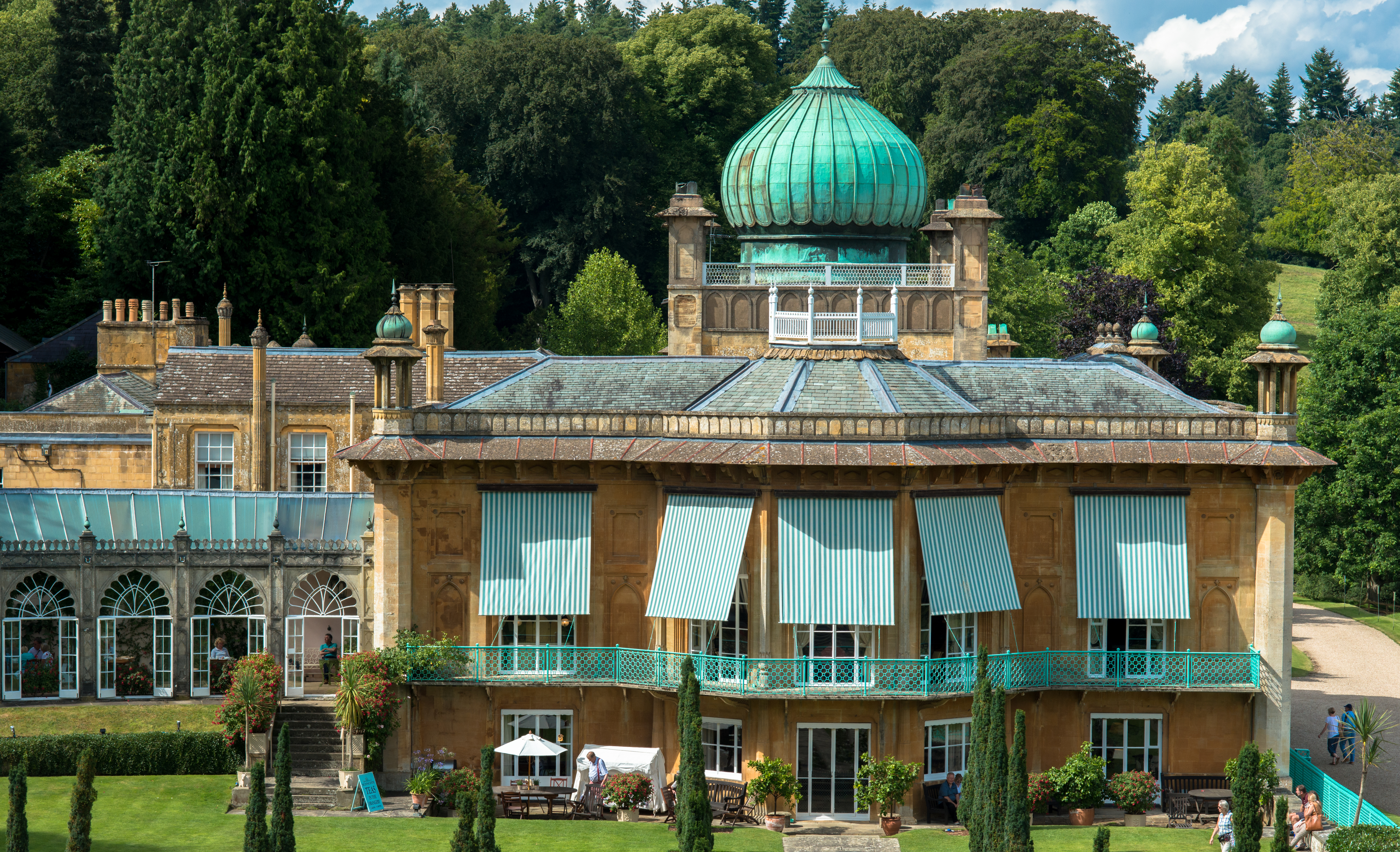
Sezincote House, Gloucestershire, 1805

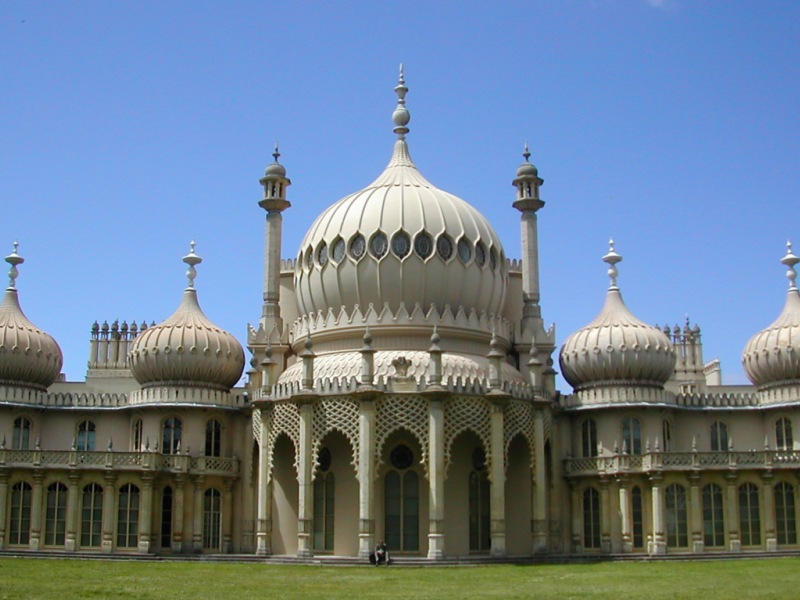
Royal Pavilion in Brighton, 1815–23

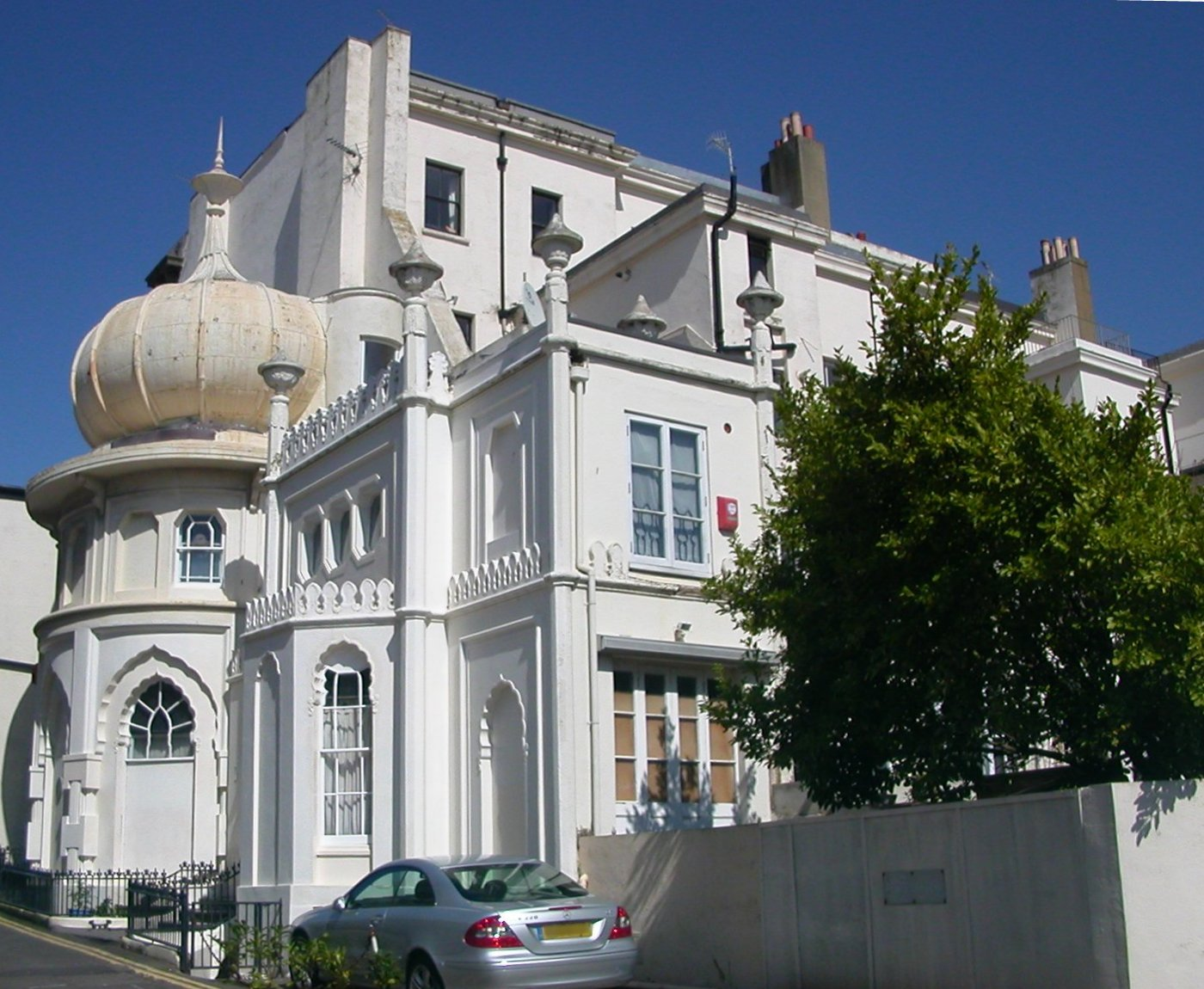
Western Pavilion in Brighton, 1828, designed by Amon Henry Wilds as his own home

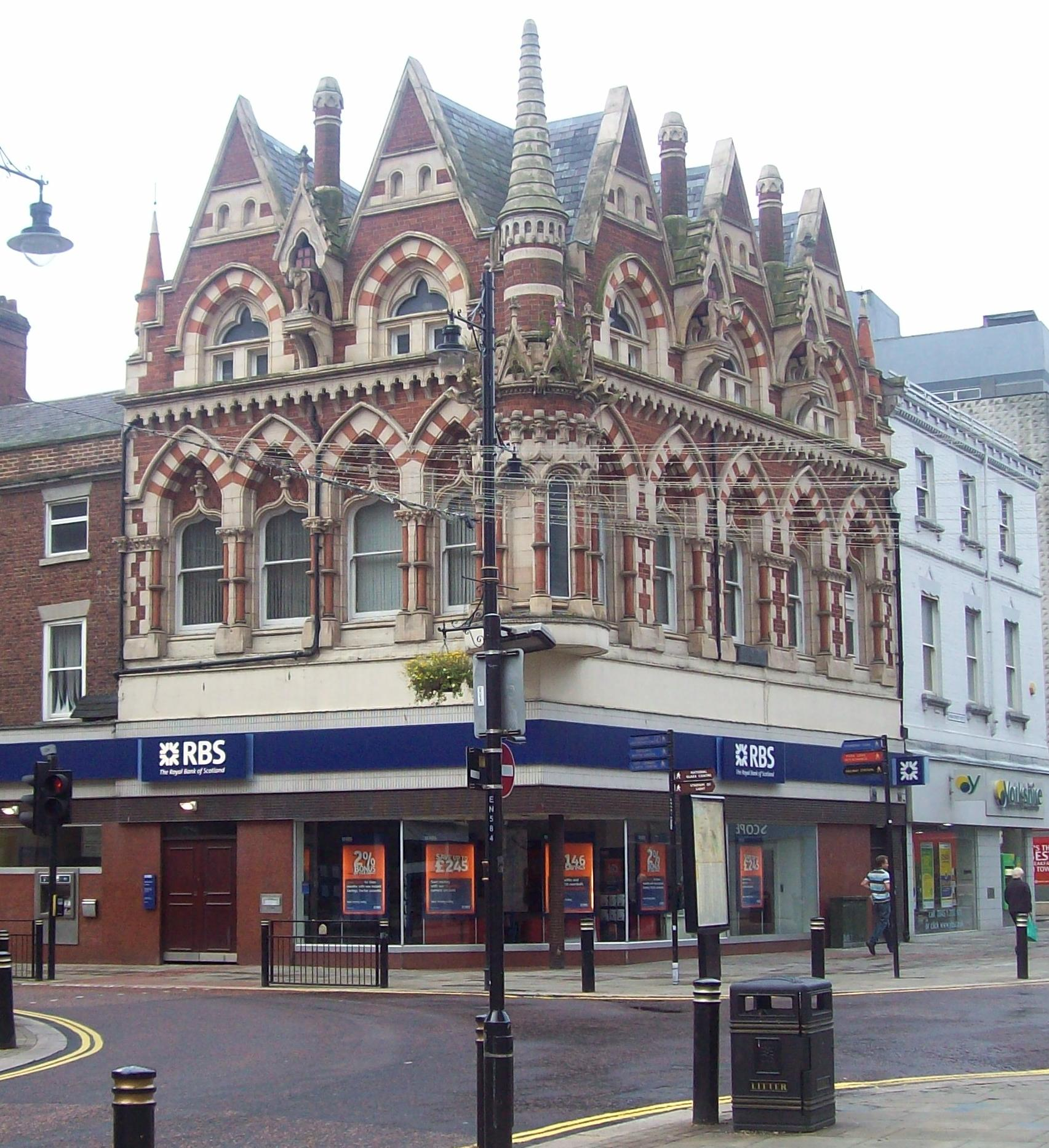
Elephant Tea Rooms, Sunderland, 1877

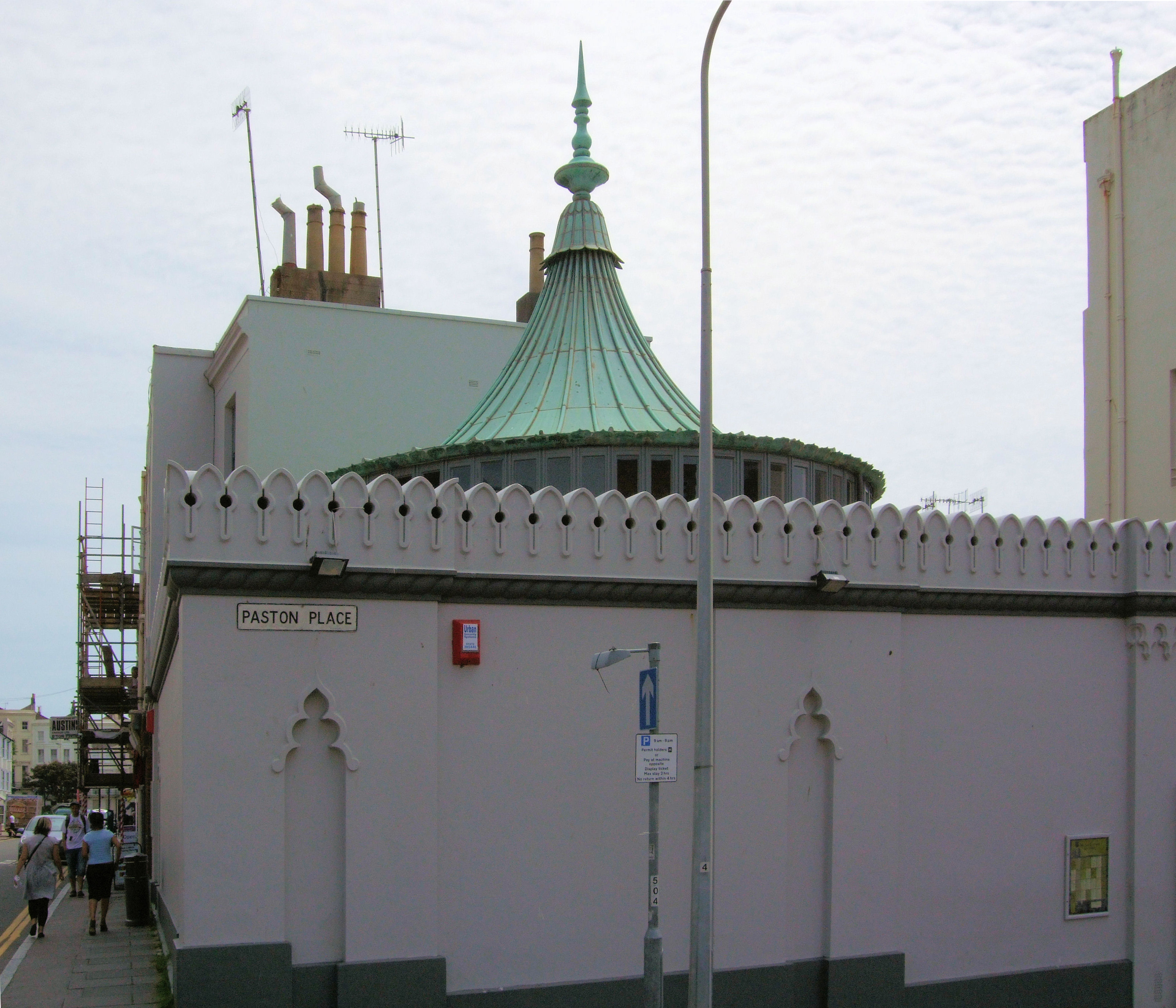
Sassoon Mausoleum, now a chic Brighton supper club, 1892

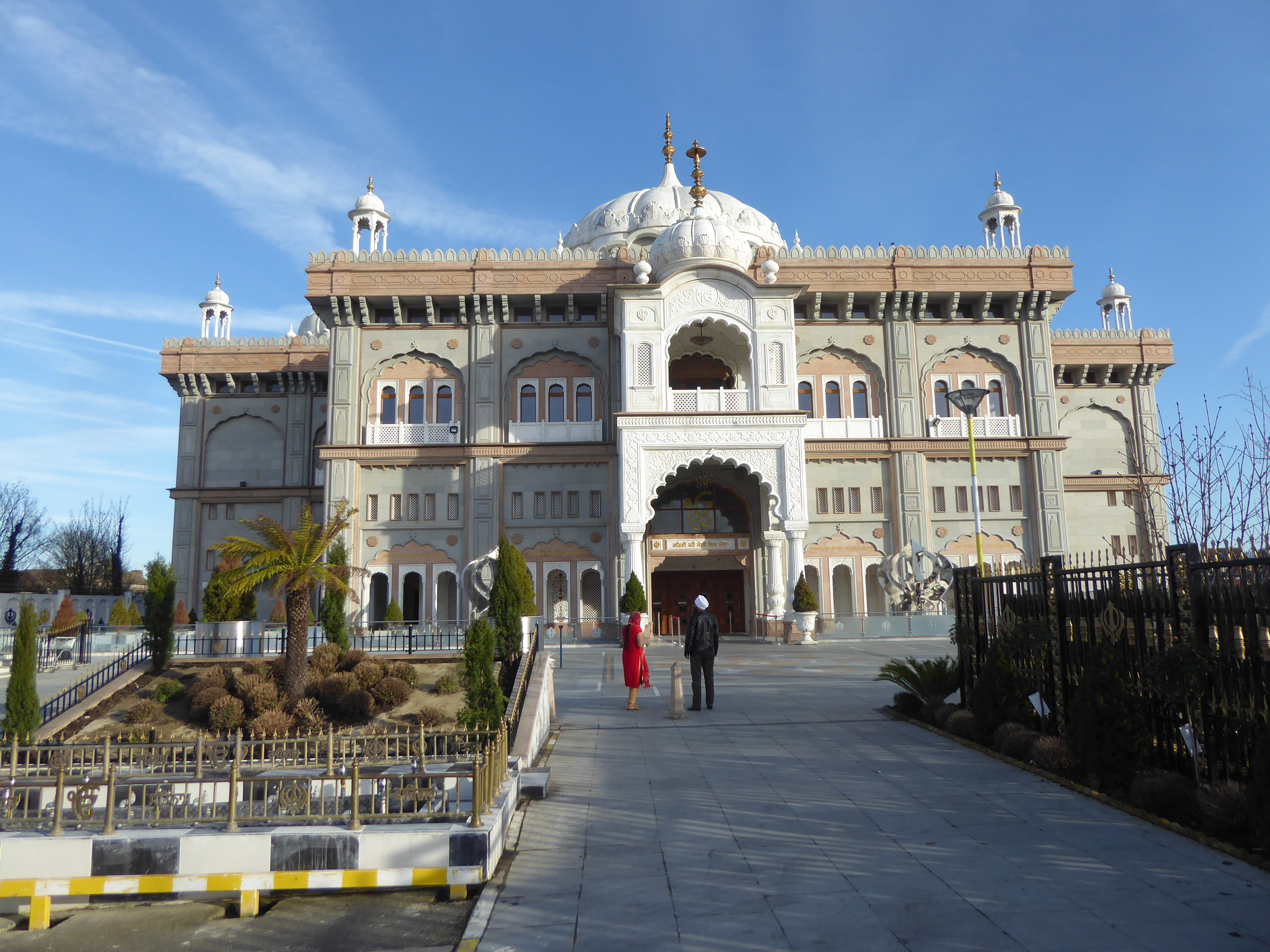
Guru Nanak Darbar Gurdwara, Gravesend

=== Sri Lanka ===
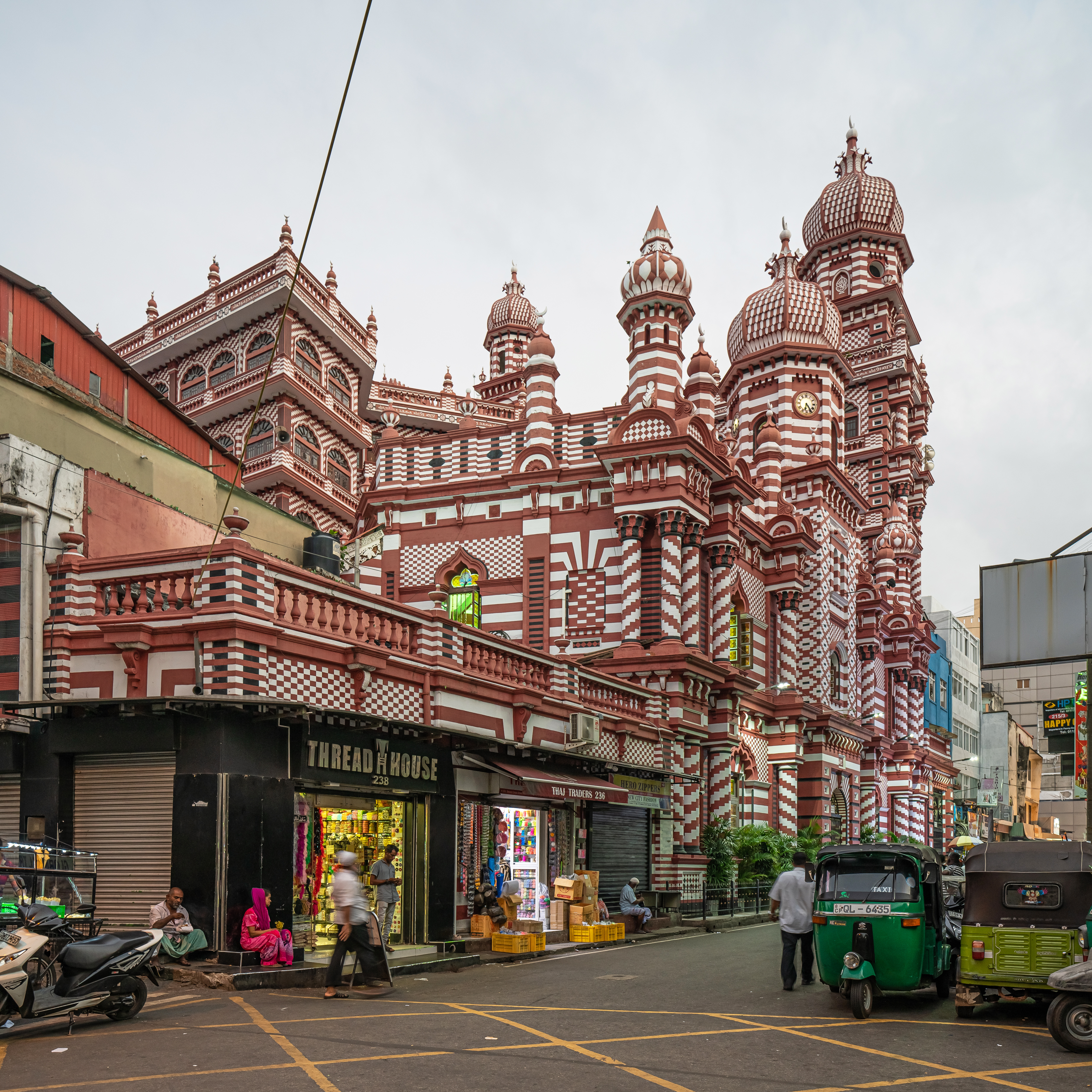
Jami Ul-Alfar Mosque in Colombo

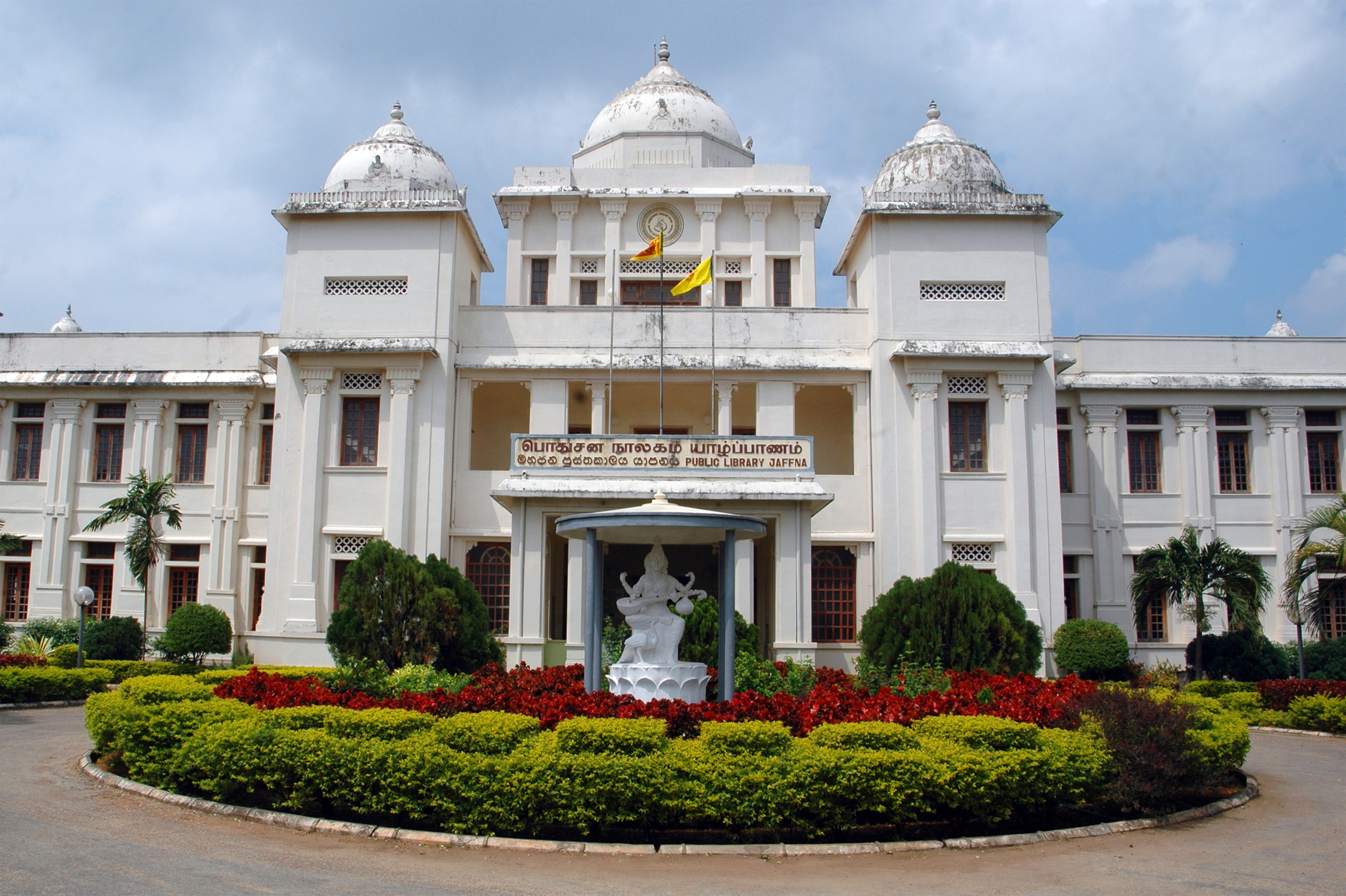
Jaffna Public Library in Jaffna

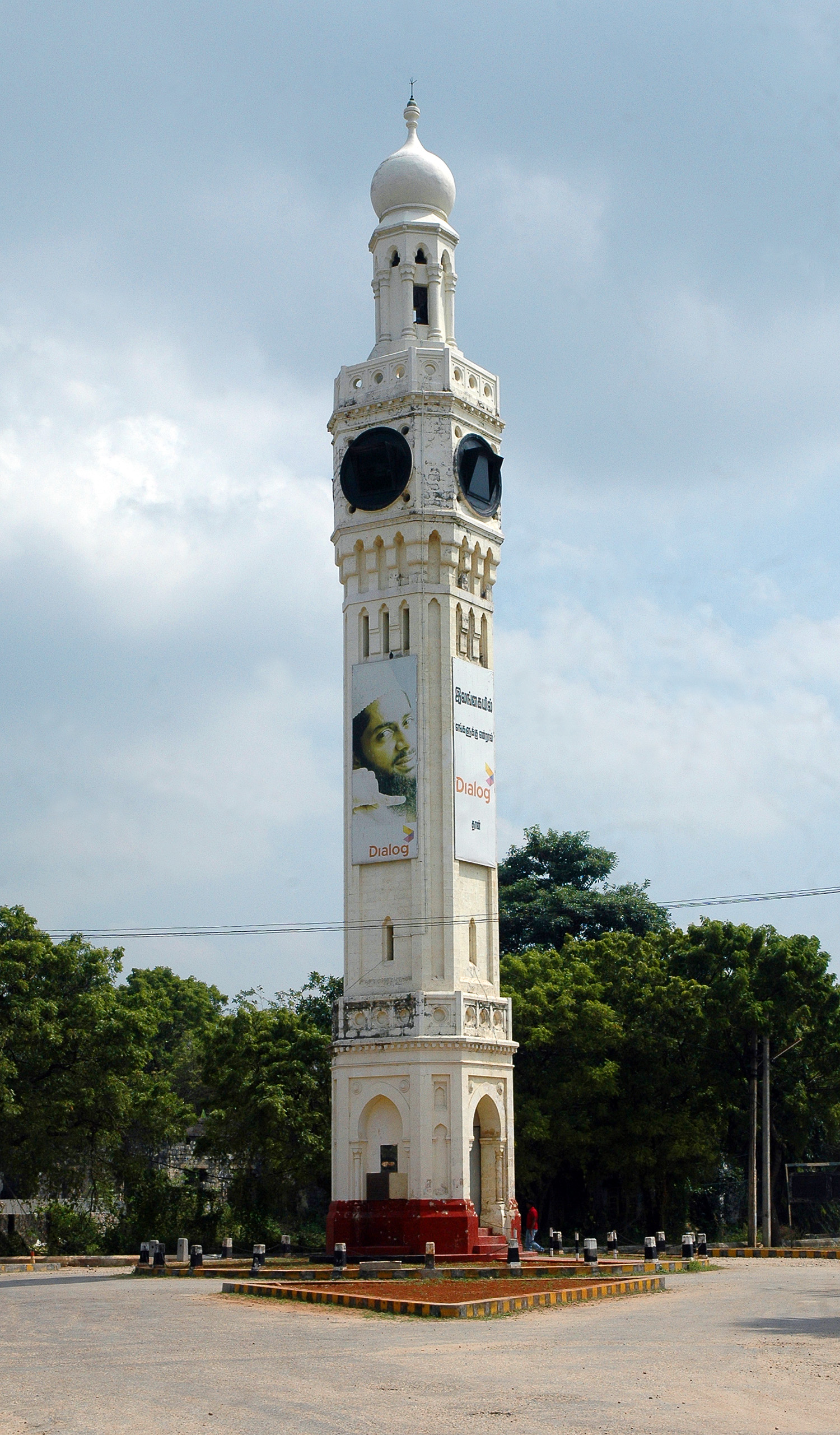
Jaffna Clock Tower in Jaffna

=== Elsewhere ===
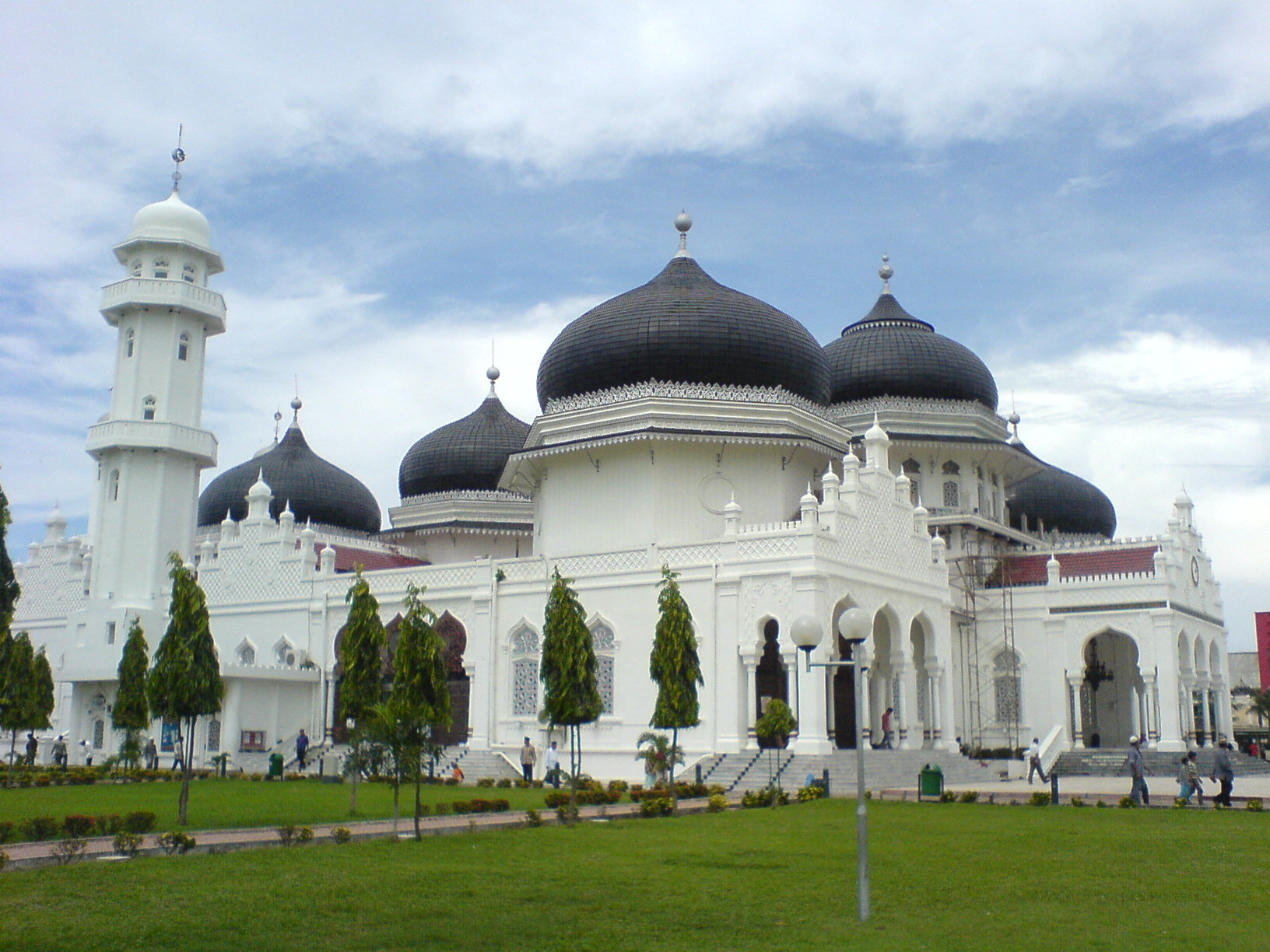
Baiturrahman Grand Mosque, Banda Aceh

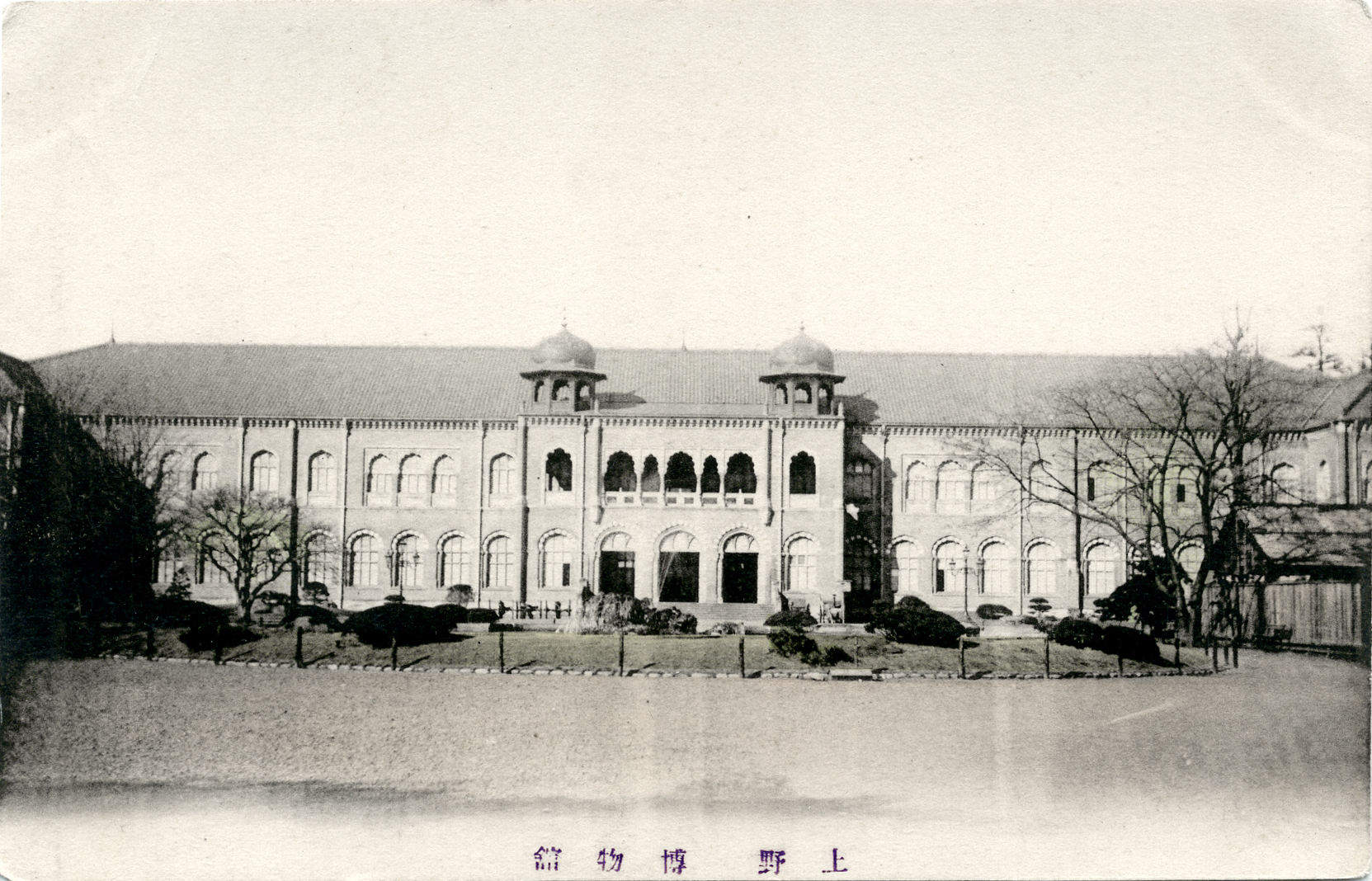
Original Honkan, Tokyo National Museum, by Josiah Conder, largely destroyed by an earthquake in 1923

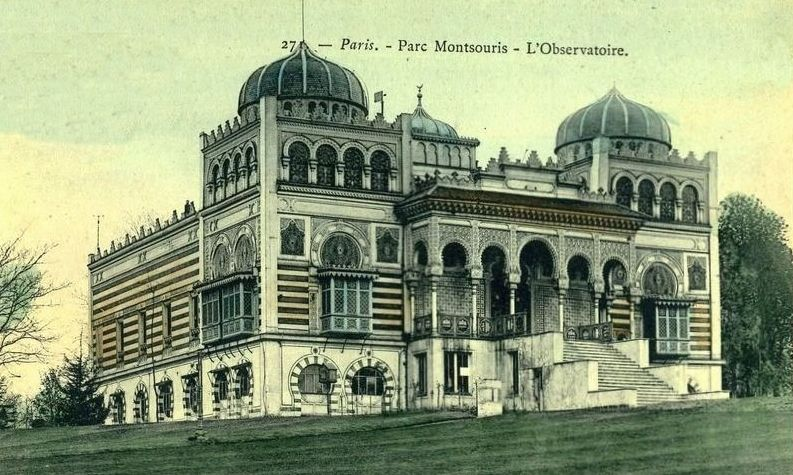
Palais du Bardo, Parc Montsouris, Paris, which burned down in 1991

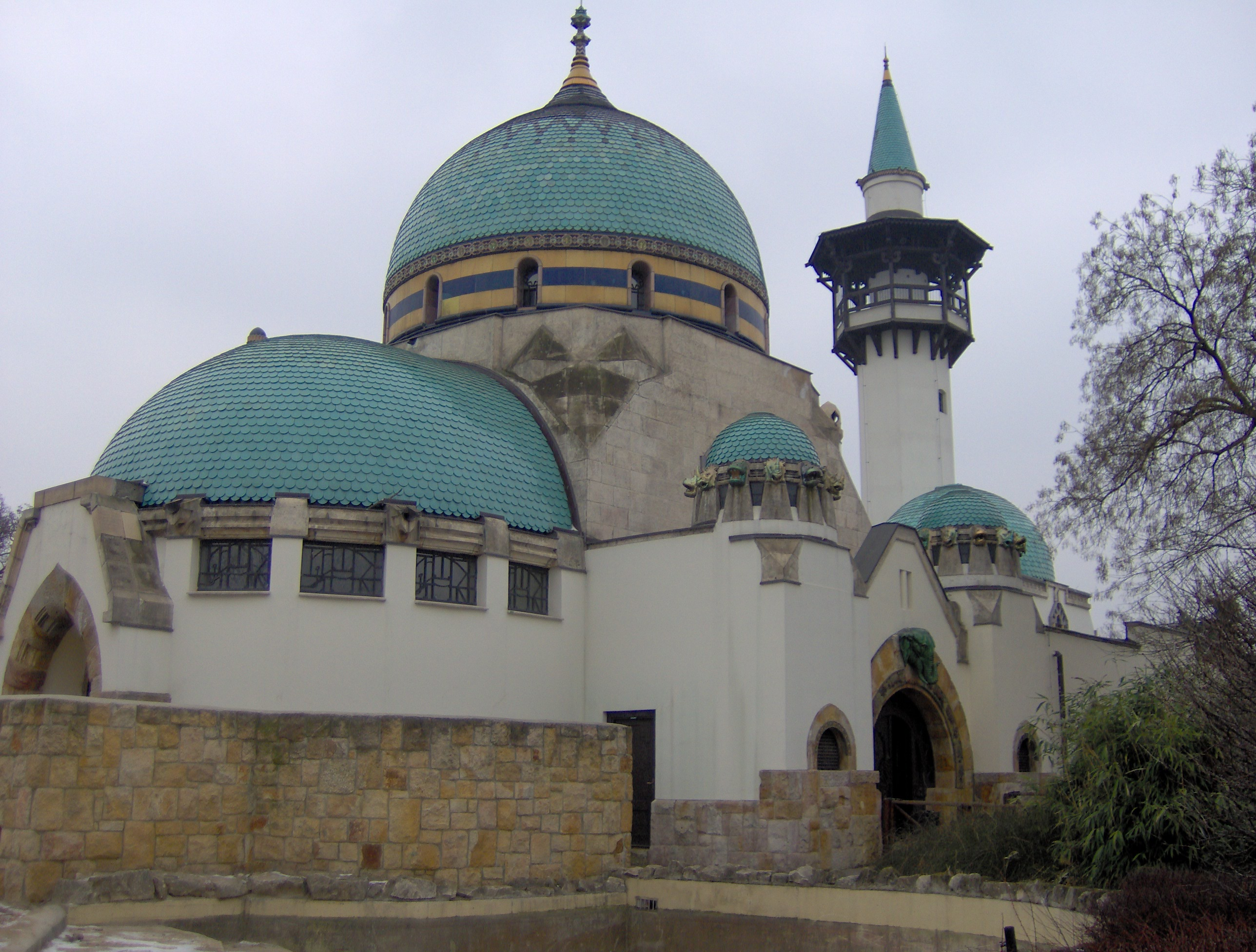
Elephant House, Budapest Zoo and Botanical Garden

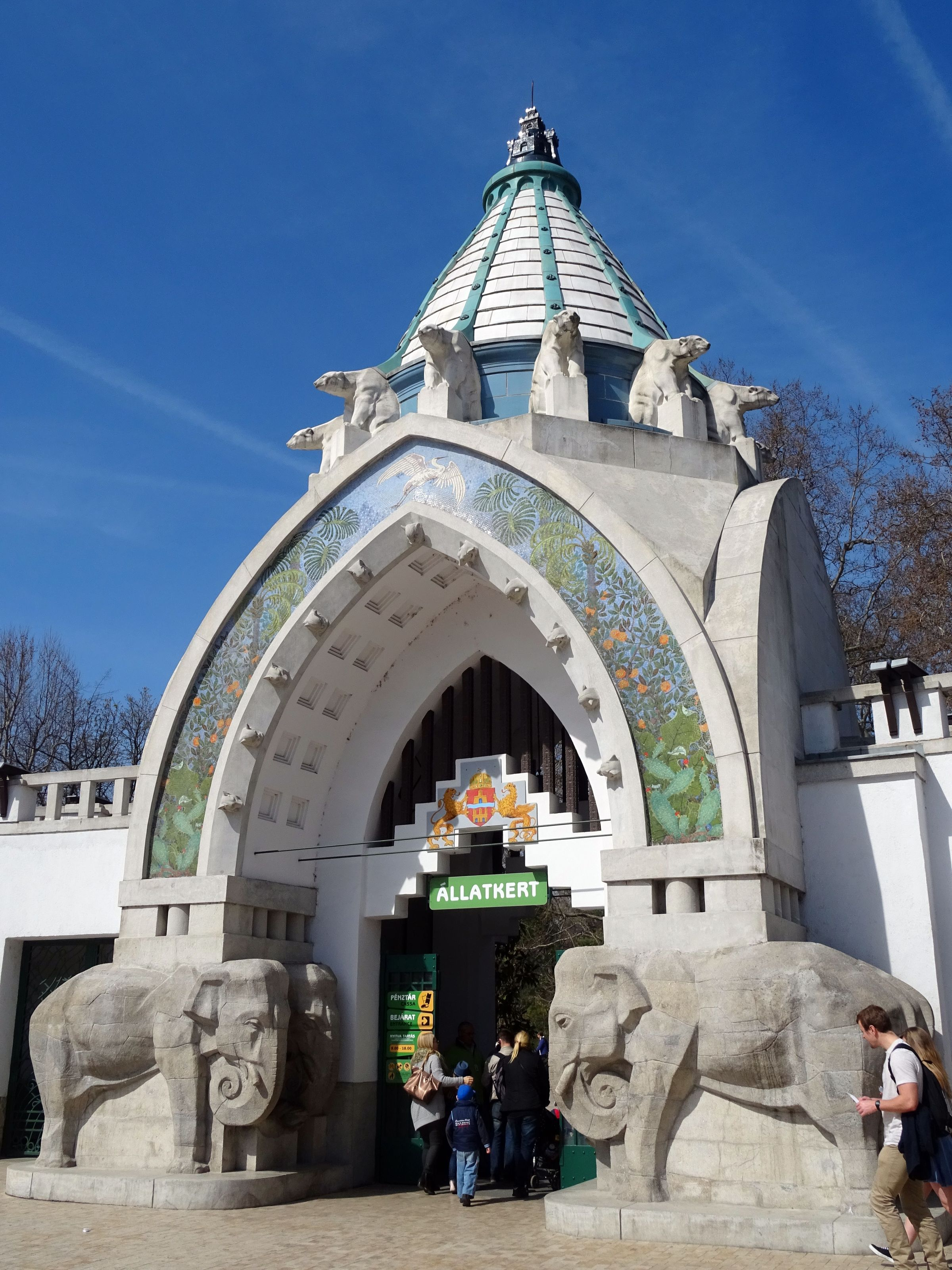
Entry House, Budapest Zoo and Botanical Garden

=== Prominently famous Indo-Saracenic buildings built after independence ===
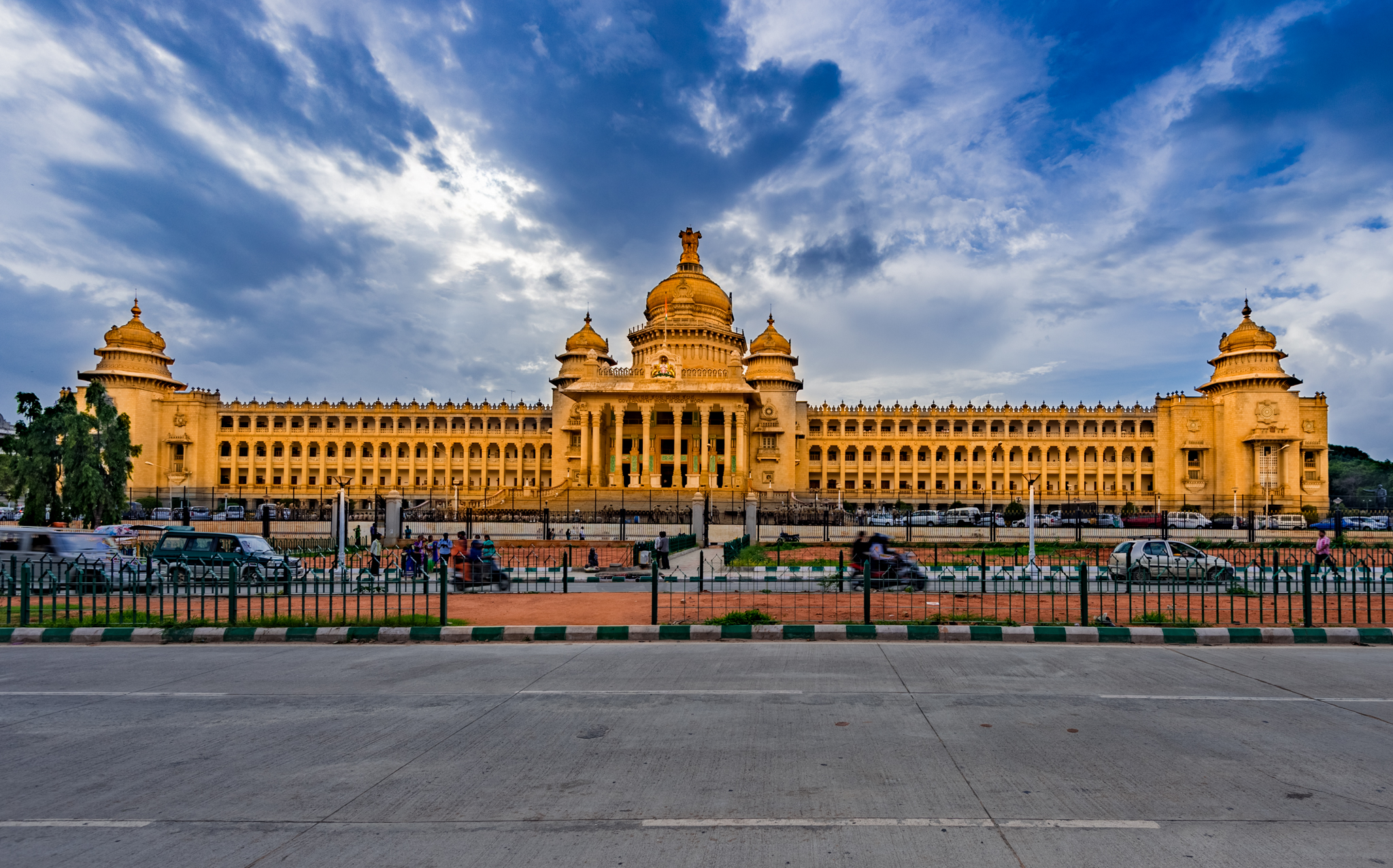
Vidhana Soudha, Bangalore incorporates elements of Indo-Saracenic and Dravidian styles. Constructed 1951–1956.

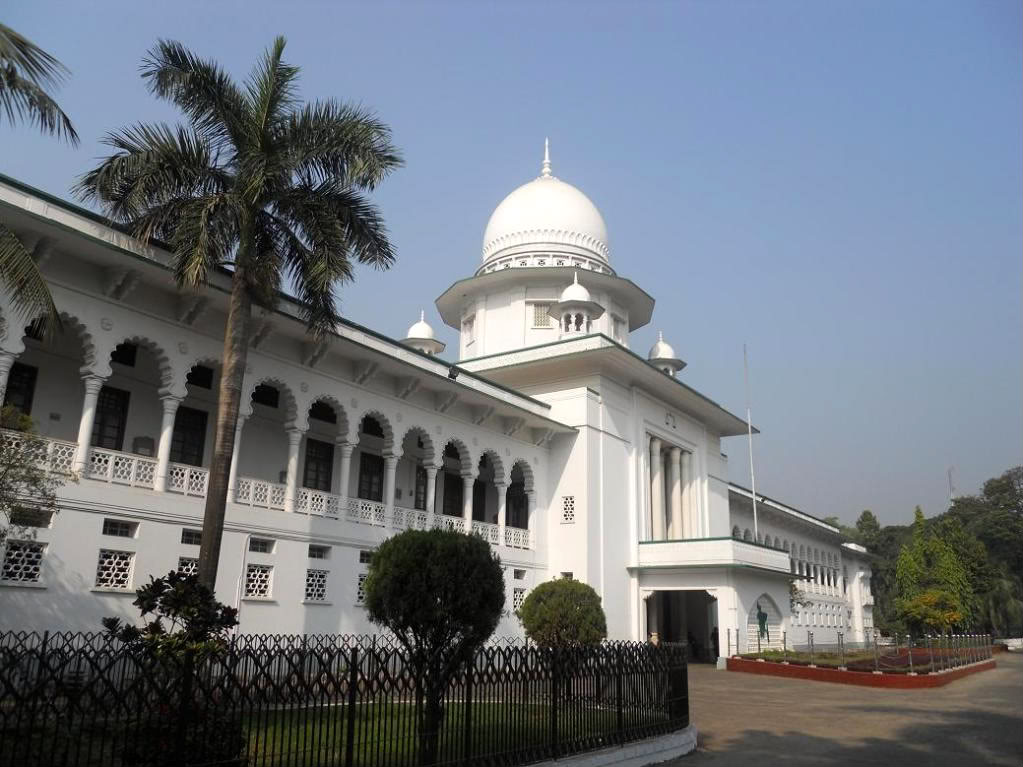
Supreme Court of Bangladesh Building opened in 1967

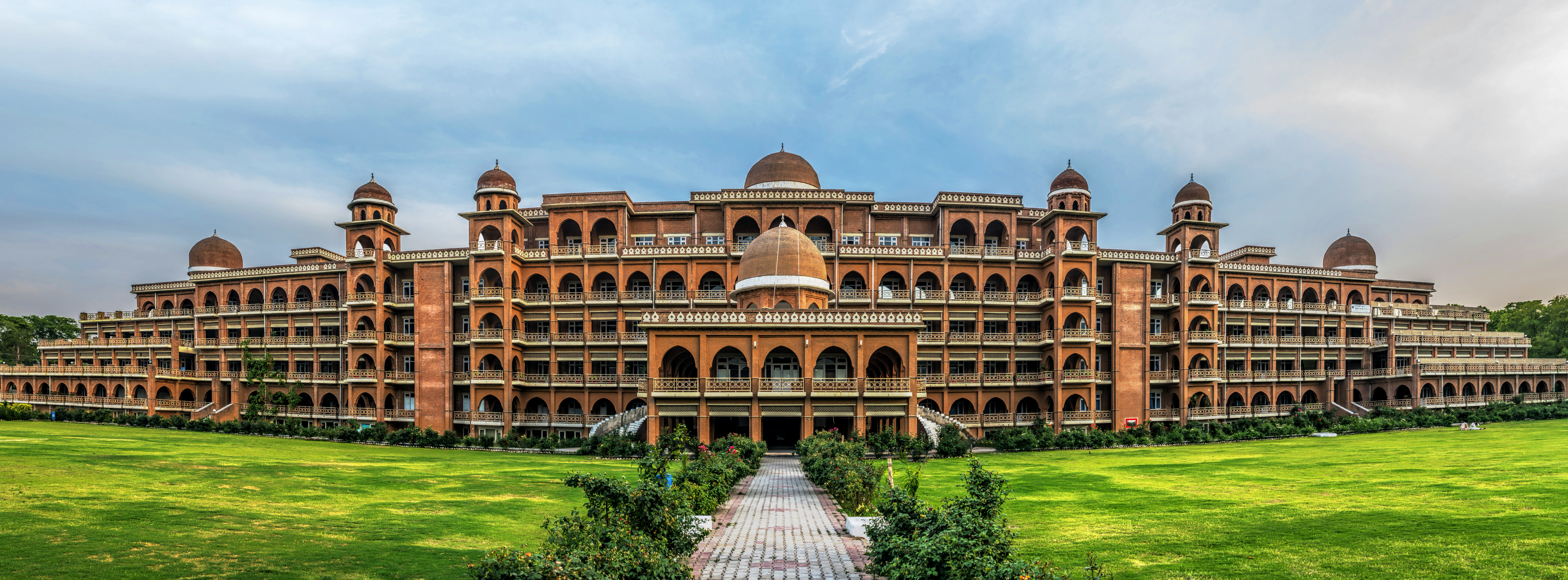
University of Peshawar, Peshawar, founded 1950
