= Henry Irwin (disambiguation) =

Henry Irwin (1841–1922) was an architect in British India.

Henry Irwin may also refer to:

- Henry Irwin (Archdeacon of Emly) (1773–1858), Irish Anglican priest
- Henry Irwin (Archdeacon of Elphin) (died 1880), Irish Anglican priest, son of the above
- Henry D. Irwin (fl. 1960), American Republican presidential elector
- Henry Irwin (Canadian politician) (born 1925), MLA in New Brunswick
