= Henry Packenham =

Henry Packenham DD (1787–1863) was an Irish Anglican priest.

Packenham was educated at Gonville and Caius College, Cambridge. He was the incumbent at Ballyroan from 1813 to 1818, and of Ardbraccan from then until 1823. In that year he became Archdeacon of Emly. In 1843 he became Dean of St. Patrick's Cathedral, Dublin; and, from 1846, also Dean of Christ Church Cathedral, Dublin.

He died on 27 December 1863.

Religious titles
Preceded by John Jebb	Archdeacon of Emly; 1823–1843	Succeeded by Henry Irwin
Preceded by Robert Daly	Dean of St. Patrick's Cathedral, Dublin; From 1846 held concurrently with 1843–1863	Succeeded by John West
Preceded by Charles Dalrymple Lindsay	Dean of Christ Church Cathedral, Dublin; 1846–1863	Succeeded by John West
