= Mysore Palace =

Historical palace in Mysore, Karnataka, India

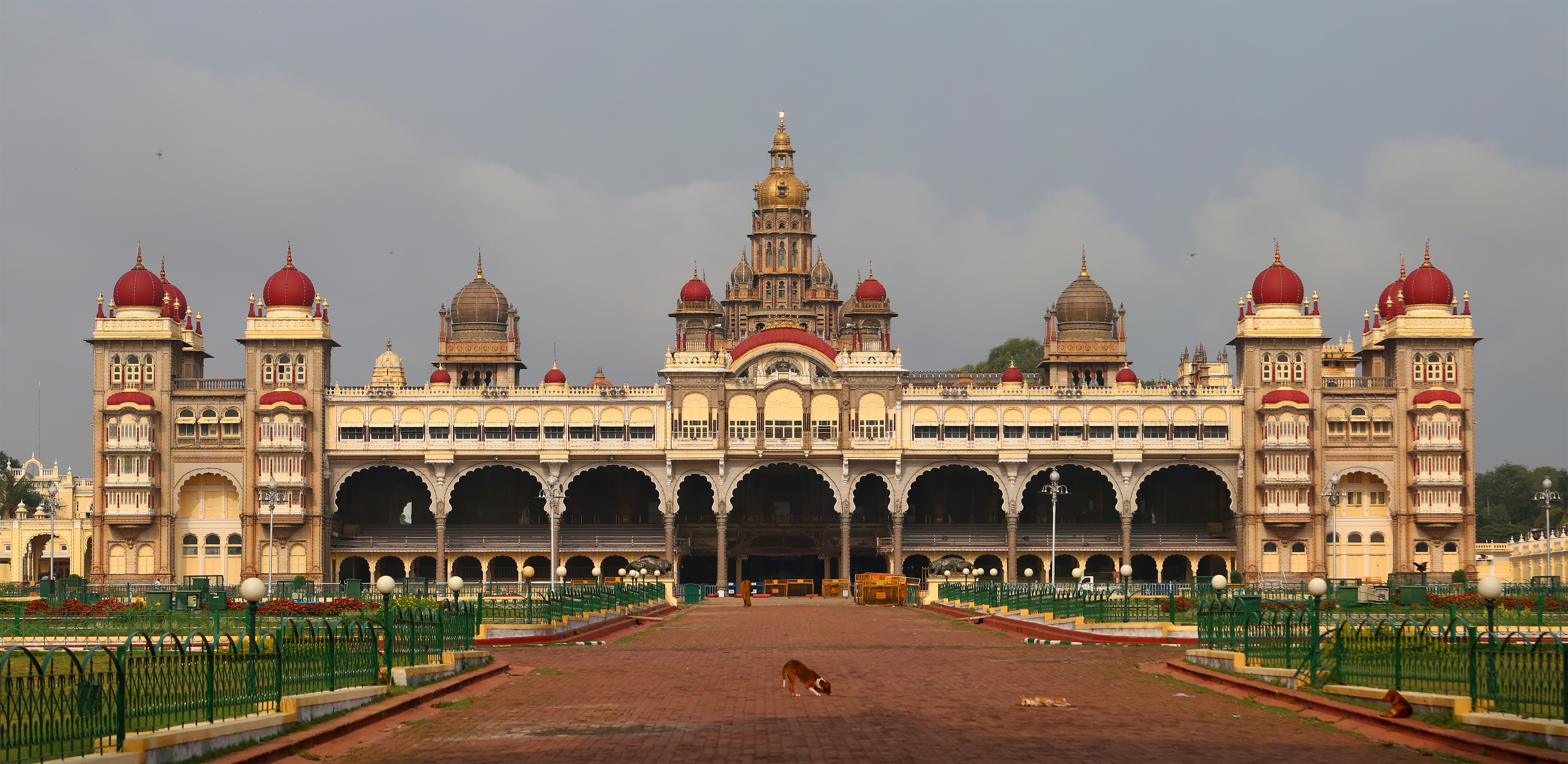
- Panoramic view of Mysore Palace
- Alternative names: Amba Vilas Palace

General information
- Status: Museum
- Architectural style: Indo-Saracenic
- Location: Sayyaji Rao Rd, Agrahara, Chamrajpura, 570001, Mysore, India
- Coordinates: 12.3039°N 76.6547°E
- Construction started: 1897
- Completed: 1912
- Renovated: 1932
- Owner: Wadiyar family and Government of Karnataka

Height
- Height: 44 m (144 ft)

Dimensions
- Other dimensions: 75 metres (246 ft) across x 48 metres (157 ft) deep

Technical details
- Floor count: 3

Design and construction
- Architect: Henry Irwin
- Other designers: Edwin Wolleston Fritchley

Website
- https://mysorepalace.gov.in

Mysore Palace, also known as Amba Vilas Palace, is a historic palace and royal residence located in Mysore, Karnataka, India. It served as the official residence of the Wadiyar dynasty and the seat of the Kingdom of Mysore, and was commissioned by Krishnaraja Wodeyar IV in August 1897 following the destruction of the previous structure in a fire. The design of the palace is attributed to Henry Irwin, a British architect who had earlier designed the Madras High Court, and Edwin Wolleston Fritchley, who would later design the Lalitha Mahal. Construction of the current structure began in 1897 and was completed in 1912. It is one of the largest palaces in India, and is a prominent example of Indo-Saracenic architecture, combining Indo-Islamic, Rajput, Hoysala and Gothic architectural styles.

The land on which the palace now stands was recorded as the site of a small fort in the late 14th century. The first palace to occupy the location was built in the 17th century during the reign of Kanthirava Narasaraja I, and was destroyed and rebuilt multiple times. Since the early 19th century, the Mysore Dasara festival has been annually held on the palace grounds, culminating in an elephant procession on Vijayadashami. In 1998, the Karnataka state government enacted the Mysore Palace Acquisition Act, acquiring ownership of the palace from the Wadiyar family; the act was subsequently challenged in court, and is the subject of an ongoing legal dispute.

The main palace houses a public museum alongside the living quarters of Yaduveer Krishnadatta Chamaraja Wadiyar, the current ceremonial head of the Wadiyar dynasty. In addition to the palace, the overall complex encompasses multiple gardens, several Hindu temples (some of which predate the current palace itself), and the old walls of the original fort. As of 2024, Mysore Palace is among the most famous tourist attractions in India, with more than four million annual visitors.

== Etymology ==
The name Amba Vilas is of Sanskrit origin. Ambā (lit. "mother") is an epithet for the Hindu goddess Durga, who according to local legend slew the demon king Mahishasura atop the nearby Chamundi Hills. The word vilāsa (lit. "pleasure") refers to a residence of pleasure or luxury, and was commonly used to name palaces in India during British rule.

== History ==
=== Early history ===
In 1524, Chamaraja Wodeyar III, then a vassal of the Vijayanagara Empire, constructed a fort with earthen walls in the village of Puragere, the predecessor of Mysore. The first recorded mention of the palace dates from 1638, when Kanthirava Narasaraja I rebuilt the palace within the fort after it was destroyed by a lightning strike. During this time, Srirangapatna served as the de facto capital of the Kingdom of Mysore, and the palace was primarily used as a residence for the maharaja when he and his retinue would visit to worship at the nearby Chamundeshwari Temple.

By the time Tipu Sultan came to power as the Sultan of Mysore, the Mysore Palace and the surrounding town had fallen into a state of neglect. In 1793, Tipu demolished the palace and parts of the outer walls of the fort, and used the stones and materials to begin construction of a new fortress to the east named Nazarabad. Following Tipu's death at the Battle of Srirangapatna in 1799, the British installed five-year old Krishnaraja Wodeyar III on the throne and began to rebuild the palace at Mysore, a project that took four years to complete. The newly restored palace was built in a Hindu style of architecture, and was made primarily of wood. Upon its completion, Mysore became the capital of the Kingdom of Mysore. Krishnaraja held the first durbar (royal assembly) at the palace in 1805, during the month of Navaratri. The early years of Krishnaraja's reign saw a large influx of immigrants from modern-day Tamil Nadu and Maharashtra to the city of Mysore; by 1836, it was estimated that the Mysore Palace employed approximately 6,000 soldiers, Brahmins, servants, and other workers in various roles. It was further estimated that by the time Krishnaraja died in 1868, a total of 10,000 people (roughly one out of every six residents in Mysore) worked at the palace in some capacity.

The Old Mysore Palace before the fire, c. 1870

Following Krishnaraja's death, the coronation ceremony of five-year old Chamarajendra Wadiyar X took place on 23 September 1868 in a pandal (pavilion) erected within the inner courtyard of the palace. The ceremony was held during the seventh day of the Dasara festival, and was attended by Lewin Bowring, the Chief Commissioner of Mysore, alongside numerous Indian and European luminaries. In the following months, Bowring made several efforts to bring the palace and its administration further under British control, including reducing the number of administrative departments from 25 to twelve, seizing and destroying all the firearms within the palace, and curtailing most of the king's spending on charity and personal luxuries. Bowring also appointed Bengal Army officer George Malleson as the guardian of the young maharaja. Malleson proceeded to relocate Chamarajendra from the palace to Bangalore for schooling, over the objections of the late Krishnaraja's two queens, Ramavilasa and Sitavilasa, who unsuccessfully petitioned the Viceroy of India Edward Lytton to countermand the order.

After Chamarajendra's death in 1894, a marble statue of his likeness was sculpted by British sculptor William Robert Colton and placed at the north entrance to the palace in 1918. Subsequently, Bombay sculptor Ganpatrao K. Mahatre was commissioned to redo the head of the sculpture, in order to more accurately represent Chamarajendra's features; the modified sculpture was unveiled in 1920.

=== Destruction and reconstruction ===
On 20 February 1897, the northern portion of Mysore Palace was largely destroyed by a ruinous fire just after the wedding ceremony of Jayalakshmi Ammanni, the maharaja-kumari (eldest princess) of Chamarajendra. The conflagration killed eight people and destroyed one-fifth of the building, including the durbar hall, the palace armory, the Sanskrit library, and the music room. Only the living quarters at the rear of the palace were left unscathed. Kempananjammanni Devi, who was ruling Mysore state as regent for the thirteen-year old Krishnaraja Wodeyar IV at the time of the incident, commissioned British architects Henry Irwin and E.W. Fritchley to build a new palace, and shifted the royal family to the nearby Jaganmohan Palace until construction was complete. Kempananjammani selected Irwin to build the palace after she was impressed by his Renaissance-inspired design of the Viceregal Lodge in Shimla, and paid him a fee of Rs 12,000 for his role as chief architect. The total cost of the project, initially projected at Rs 25,00,000, ultimately ballooned to an estimated Rs 41,47,913 (around US$30 million adjusted to inflation). In accordance with guidelines issued by the state government, the palace was primarily constructed of stone, brick and iron, with the use of inflammable materials kept to a minimum.

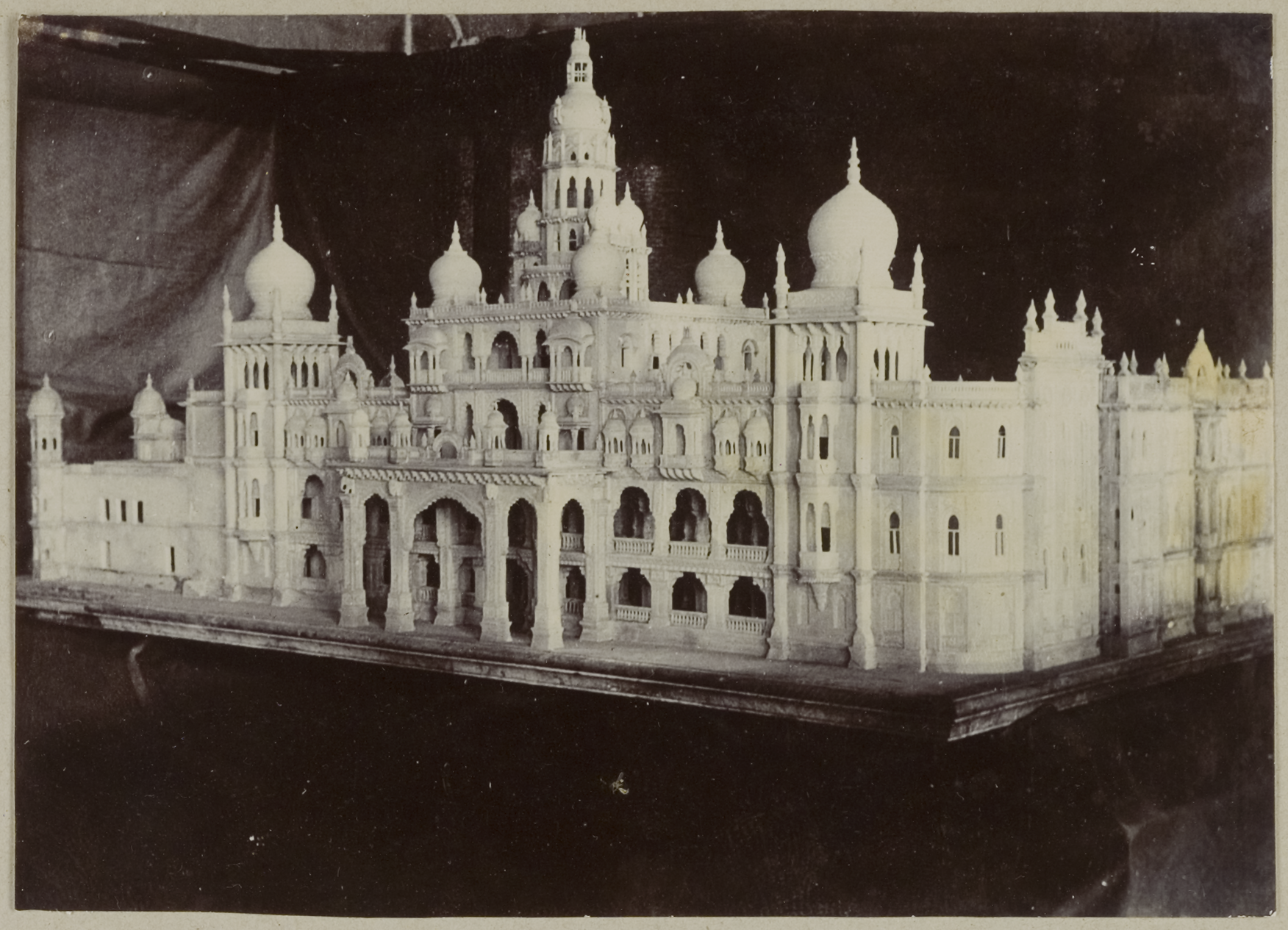
A marble model of the new palace under construction, c. 1912

The Scottish traveler William Murdoch visited the palace in 1908 towards the final stages of construction, and described the intricate carvings of indigenous flora and fauna in marble, granite and teak as "out and away beyond anything we could almost dream of at home" in terms of technical skill. Murdoch noted that hundreds of carvers and thousands of masons were involved in the construction of the building, and that each was paid a fixed daily salary of 1s. 4d (roughly equivalent to 1 silver rupee at the time), describing it as "good pay here". Four years after Murdoch's visit, construction of the palace finished in 1912.

During the reconstruction of the palace, the outlying areas within the original fort complex also underwent significant changes. Prior to its destruction, the old palace had been surrounded by a dense urban center, with businesses, public offices, temples, and residential streets segregated by caste directly adjoining the main palace building. These buildings were cleared out of the complex and replaced with wide streets and large gardens, in an attempt to improve the appearance and cleanliness of the palace. Many of the former residents relocated to and settled in the newly-built suburbs outside of the complex, which maintained the religion and caste-based stratifications enforced in the old city.

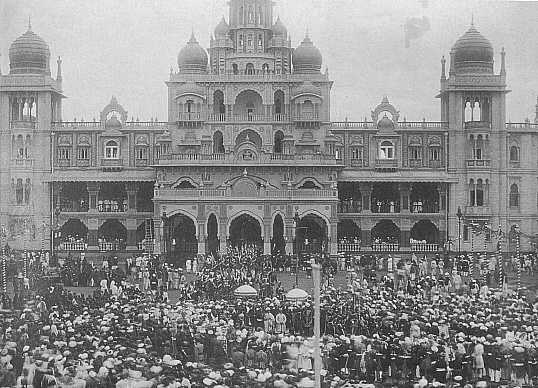
The eastern portico of the palace prior to its 1932 reconstruction

The completed palace subsequently underwent a series of renovations in the early 1930s, during the reign of Krishnaraja Wadiyar IV. These restoration efforts included the enlargement of the old eastern-facing portico of the palace to accommodate the construction of a redesigned open-view durbar hall facing east, and the addition of multiple square towers at the northern and southern ends of the façade.

Tirumalai Krishnamacharya, popularly known as the "Father of Modern Yoga", taught yoga in the palace during the 1920s at the request of Krishnaraja Wadiyar IV. Among his pupils there were B. K. S. Iyengar and K. Pattabhi Jois, the respective founders of Iyengar Yoga and Ashtanga Yoga. Krishnamacharya's teachings at the palace were likely influenced by the Sritattvanidhi, a 19th-century work attributed to Krishnaraja Wodeyar III that illustrated a series of 112 yoga postures. Krishnaraja's successor, Jayachamarajendra Wadiyar, did not share his uncle's interest in yoga, and the study and teaching of yoga at the palace largely waned in the 1940s.

=== Post-independence ===
On 26 January 1950, following the Dominion of India's transition to a republic and the adoption of the Constitution of India, Jayachamarajendra Wadiyar read a proclamation in the Durbar Hall of the palace in which he formally ceded control of the Kingdom of Mysore to the newly-created Republic of India. Jayachamaraja subsequently became the first Governor of Mysore State. In 1951 and 1953, he had two temples constructed on the palace grounds, the Bhuvaneshvari Temple and Gayatri Temple. In 1971, the title of Maharaja of Mysore was abolished after the passage of the 26th Amendment, and the two front floors of the palace became a museum open to the public.

In 2017, an electrical fire caused by faulty wiring within an ATM kiosk caused damage to the east gate of the palace.

On 25 December 2025, a gas cylinder filled with helium exploded on the palace grounds near the eastern gate during Christmas day celebrations, killing three people and injuring four others. The blast occurred at roughly 8:30 p.m. when a balloon salesman improperly added caustic soda to an aluminum cylinder while filling balloons, causing a chain reaction that led to the explosion. Following the incident, the use of helium gas to fill balloons in public places was prohibited by the city of Mysore.

== Architecture ==
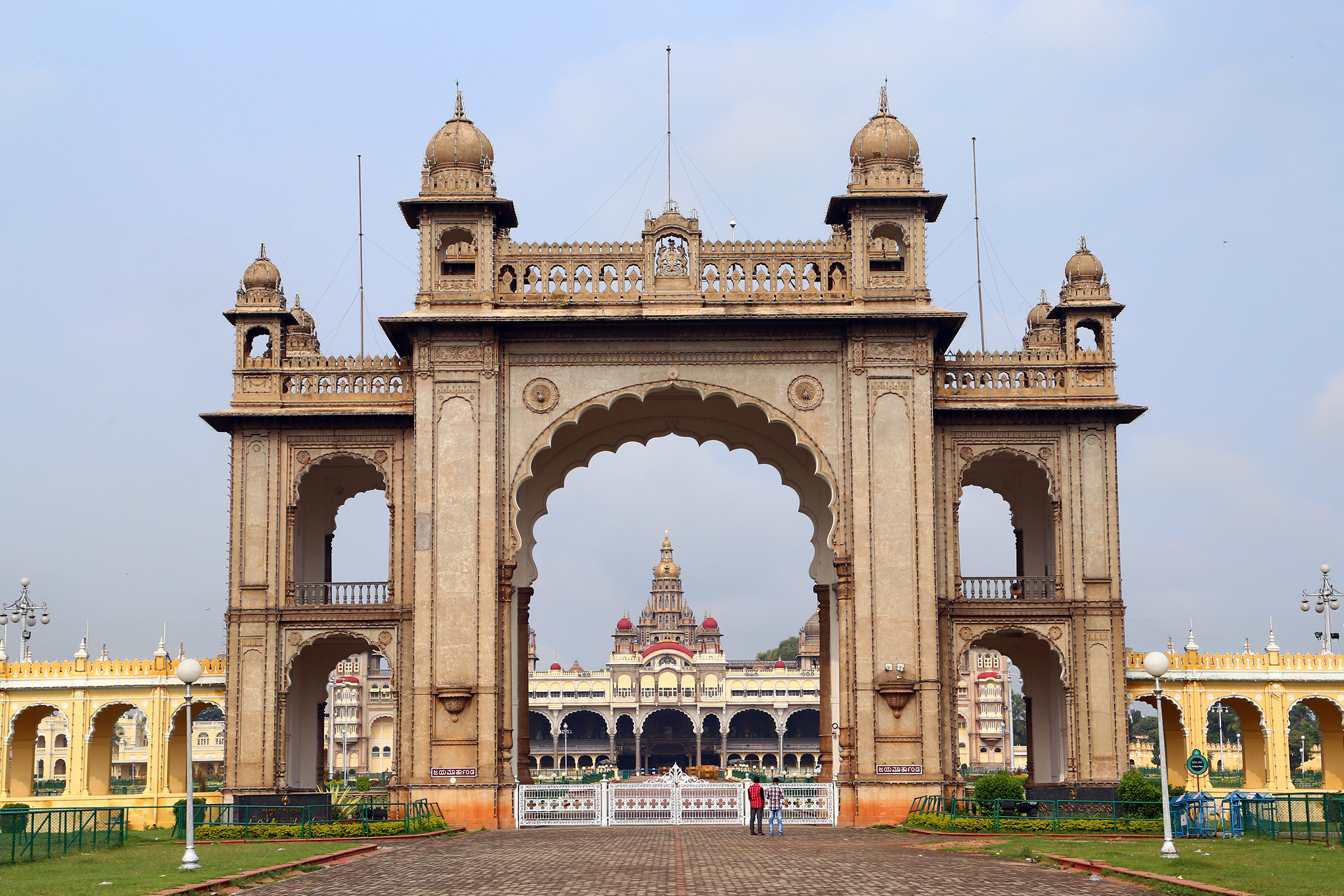
Eastern entrance gate

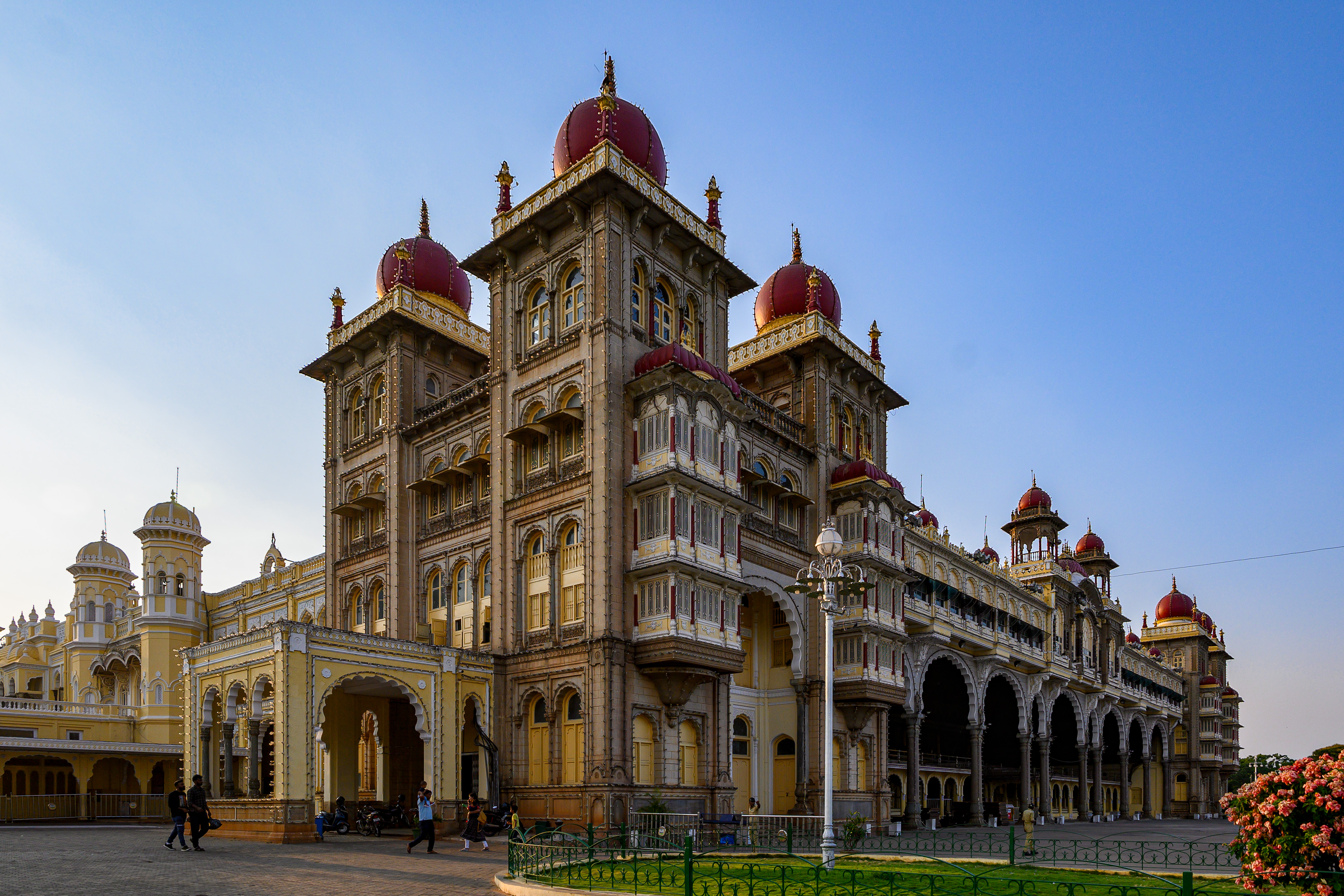
Southeast view of the façade

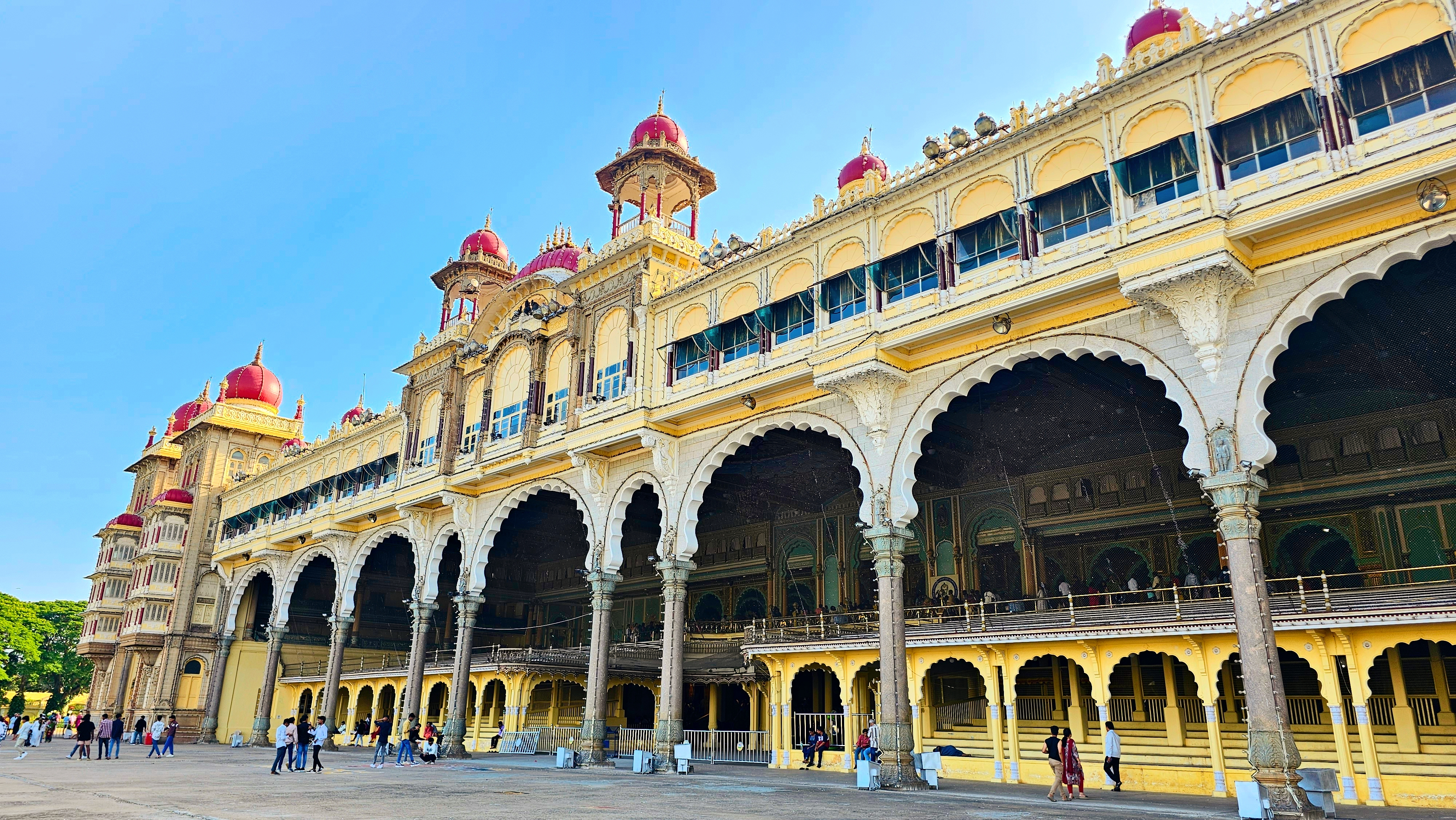
Central archways

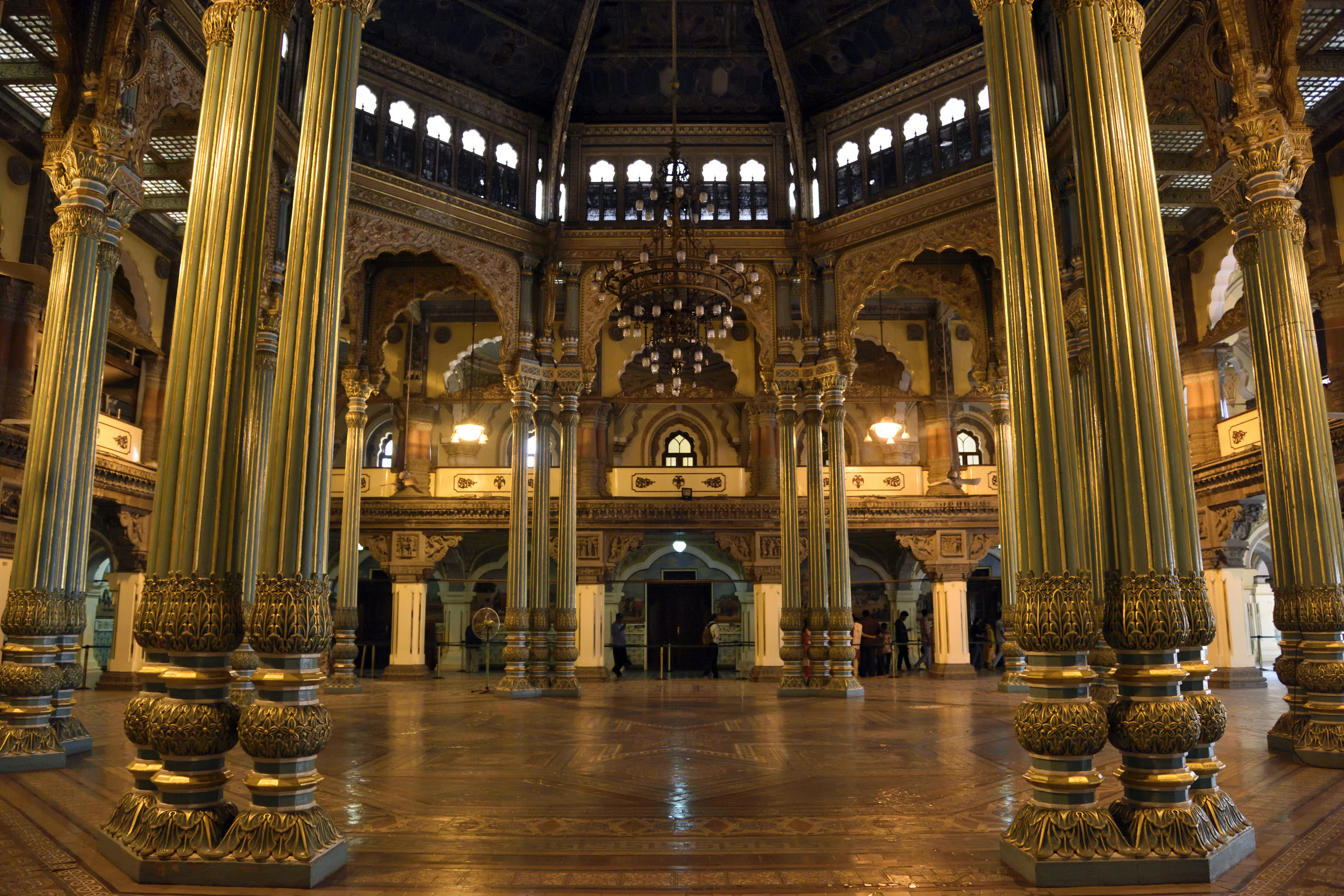
Marriage Hall

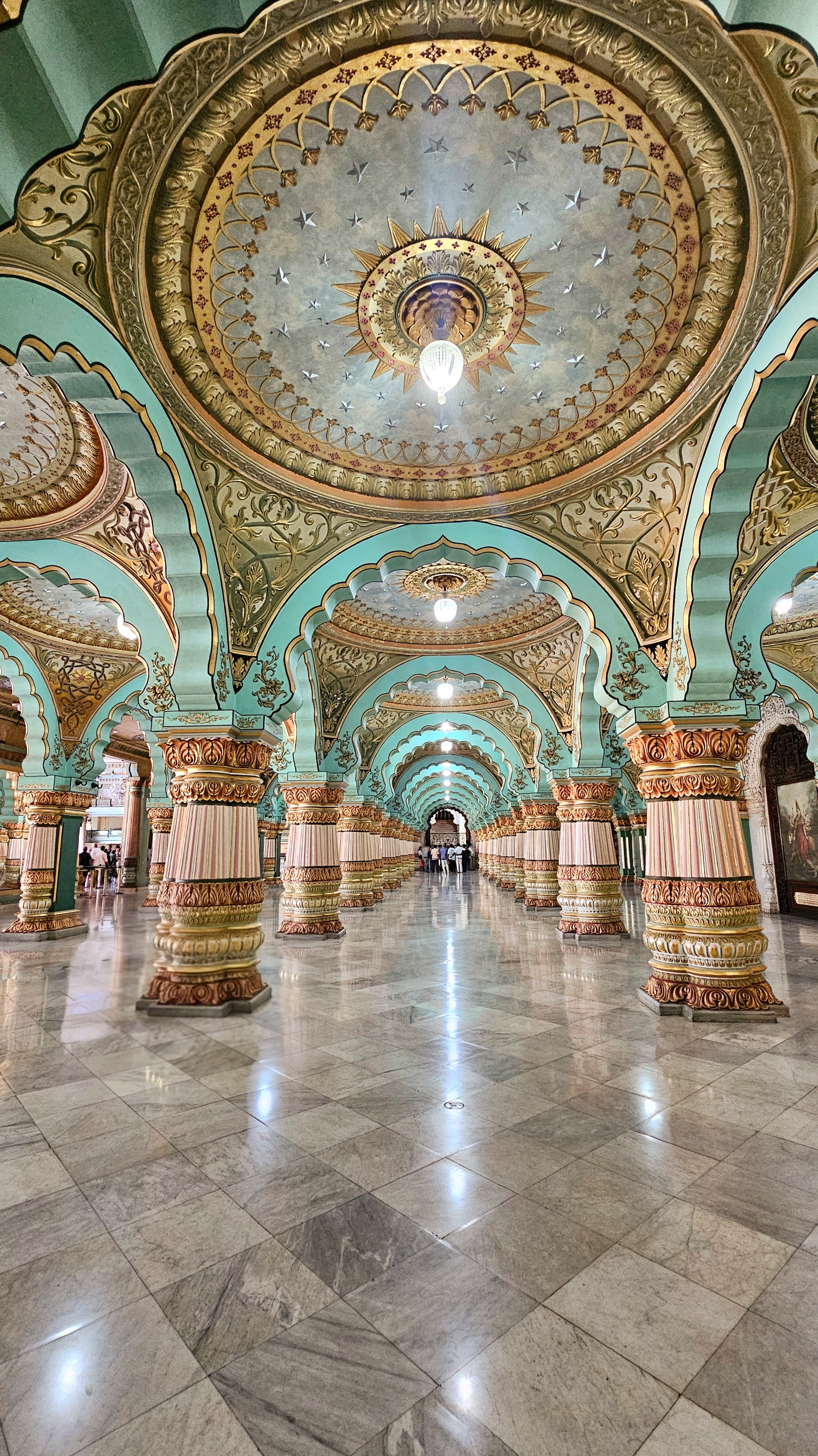
Durbar Hall

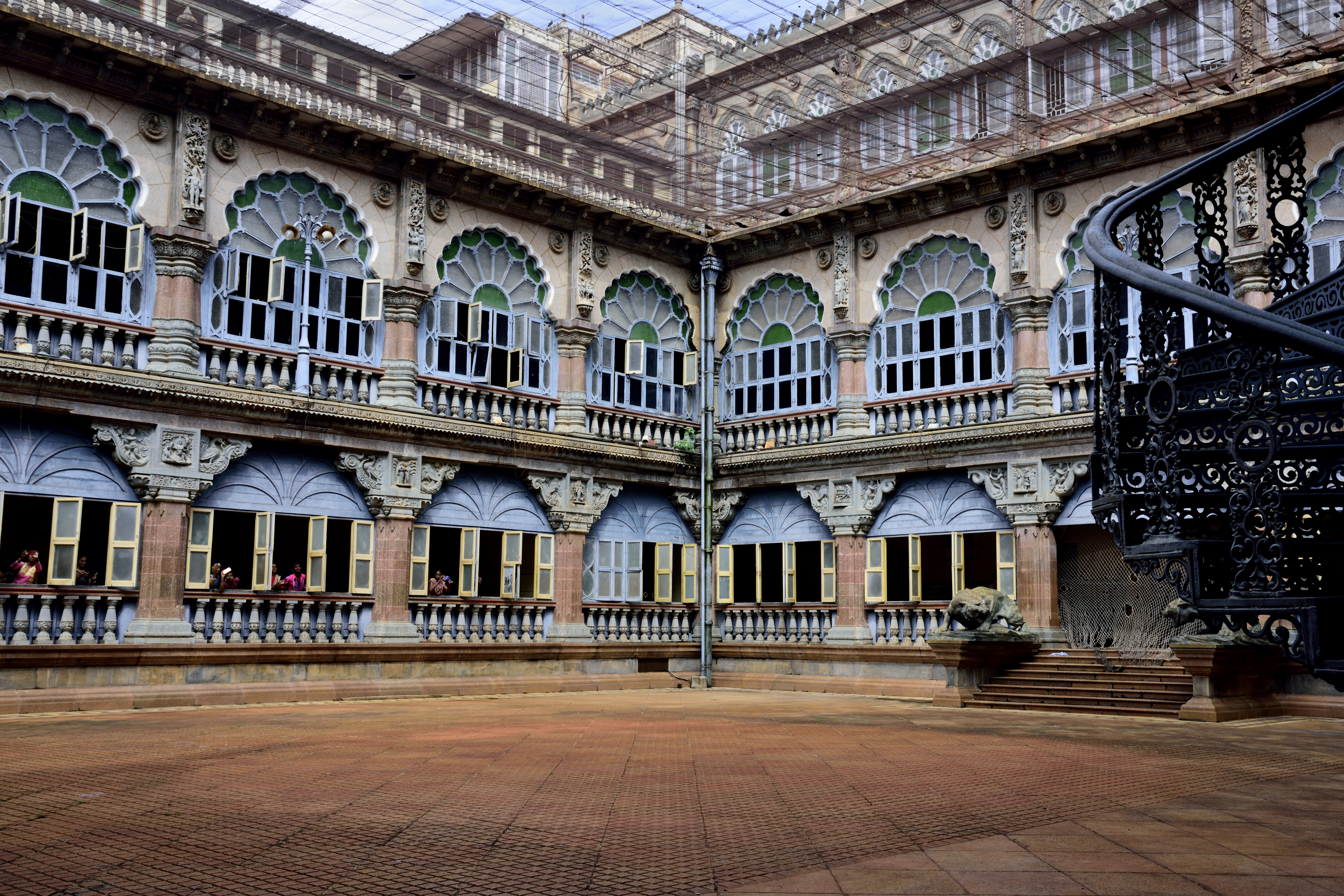
Wrestling courtyard

"The new palace; the modern sight of southern India. It is brimming with life; it looks like a Gothic cathedral in course of construction... I believe it is intended to be the finest palace in the world, and if a great many exquisite fancies put together, will form one great conception, then certainly this expression in architecture must be a magnificent work of art."

— William Gordon Burn Murdoch, From Edinburgh to India & Burmah (1908)

The palace is a three-story building, roughly 75 m (245 ft) in length and 48 m (156 ft) in width, chiefly constructed of red and grey-green granite. The defining structure of the palace is the five-story central tower, which culminates in a gold-plated onion-shaped dome characteristic of Mughal architecture. Instead of the typical finial, the main dome supports a smaller chhatri, a feature commonly seen in Rajasthani palaces. The main façade of the palace features a large central archway that forms the eastern entrance to the building, flanked by four smaller arches on each side supported by granite pillars. At both ends of the palace are three square towers, each five stories tall and topped with a pink marble dome and finial. A prominent sculpture of Gajalakshmi (a representation of Lakshmi, the Hindu goddess of wealth) is fixed above the central arch. Designed by Henry Irwin, an English architect, the palace is a classic example of Indo-Saracenic architecture, with elements from Mughal, Rajput, Hoysala and Gothic architecture styles.

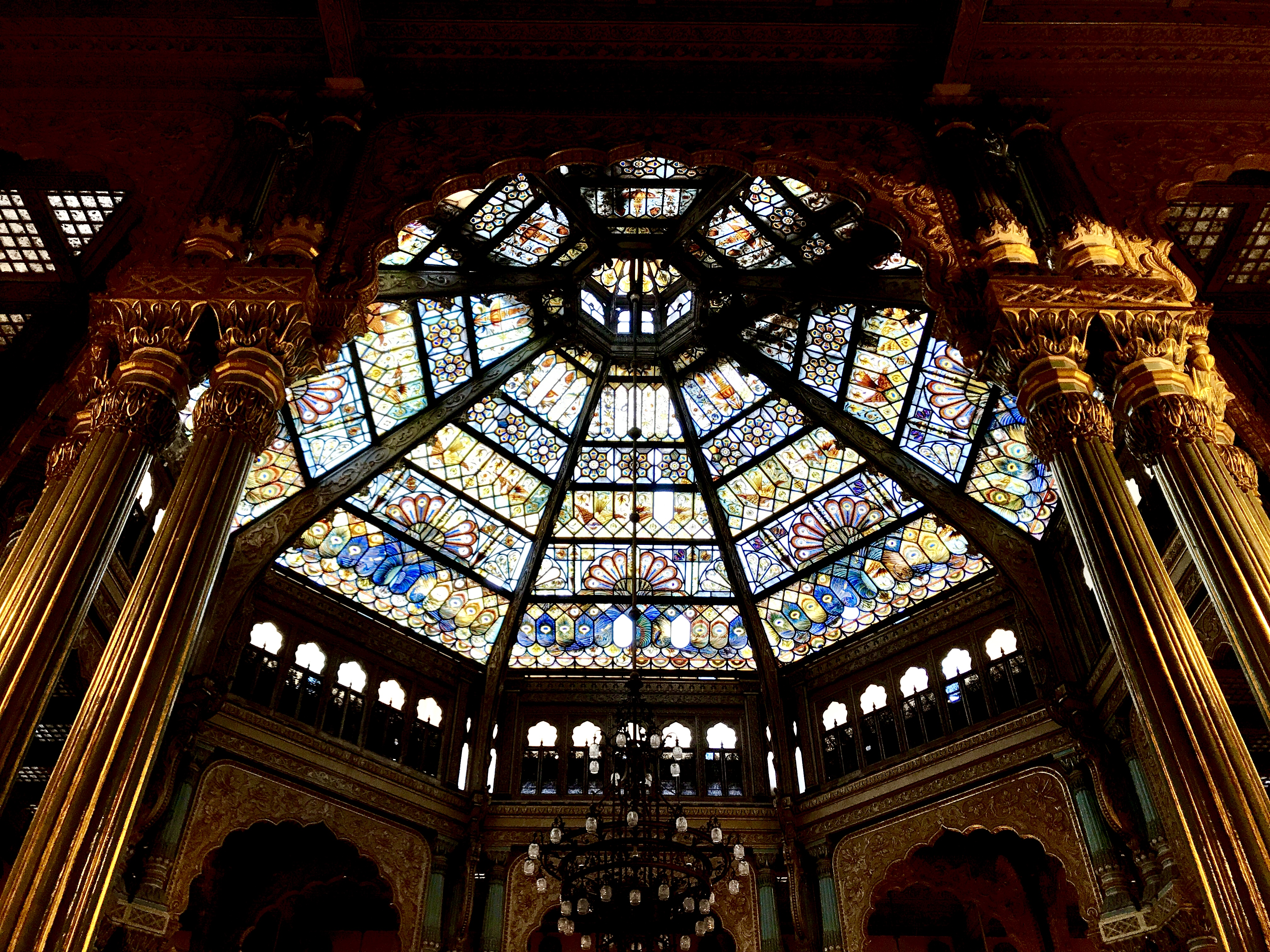
Ceiling of marriage hall

The entrance to the palace, marked by a wrought-iron gate named Ane Bagilu (lit. "elephant gate"), leads to a large open-air courtyard, traditionally used as an exhibition ground for wrestling during Dasara. Beyond the courtyard is the marriage hall, with an octagonal central pavilion, vaulted ceiling and a stained-glass dome supported by cast-iron pillars designed by the Scottish foundry Walter MacFarlane & Co. and imported from Glasgow. The walls of the marriage hall feature several oil paintings, depicting various rituals and functions associated with the Mysore Dasara festival held annually on the palace grounds.

The first floor of the palace is occupied by two large durbar halls, where the king would entertain important guests and conduct meetings with advisors. The public hall, known as Diwan-e-Aam, measures 47 m (155 ft) in length and 13 m (42 ft) in width, has an open view of the eastern entrance to the palace, and features several rows of ornately carved granite pillars. The ceilings are decorated with frescoes depicting deities from Hindu mythology, and the walls feature artwork from Indian painter Raja Ravi Varma. The inner private hall, known as Diwan-e-Khas, is similar in design to the public hall, and features carved teak doors and marble flooring decorated with intricate pietra dura inlays.

Outside, the palace is surrounded by numerous gardens and temples. The palace complex has multiple entrances: the Jaya Marthanda gate to the East, the Jayarama and Balarama gates to the North, the Varaha gate to the South, and the Brahmagiri gate to the West.

== Attractions ==
The palace complex is home to two separate museums. The public museum, owned and operated by the Mysore Palace Board, offers tours of the first and second floors of the main palace, including the durbar and marriage halls. The private Residential Museum, owned by the Wadiyar family, offers tours of the former royal family's living quarters to the rear of the palace. At the main entrance, there are a series of bronze panthers, sculpted by British sculptor Robert William Colton in 1909, on both sides of the walkway leading up to the palace.

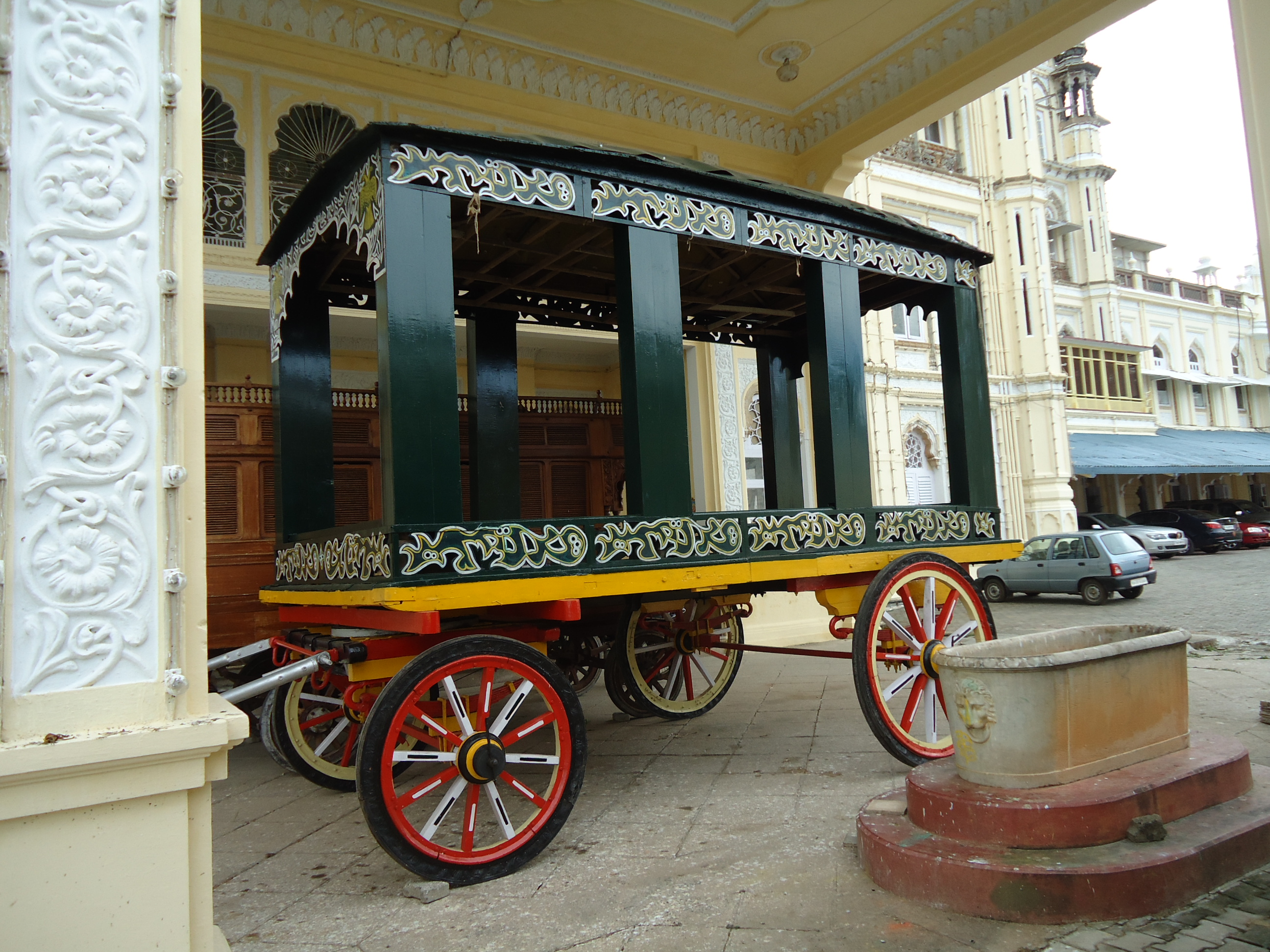
A horse-drawn cart outside the Residential Museum

=== Residential Museum ===
The Residential Museum is located in the rear section of the palace, which dates to the early 19th century and largely survived the 1897 fire. The first floor of the museum houses a large collection of traditional paintings, children's toys, and musical instruments. The second floor contains the palace armory, which displays a total of 725 weapons and military exhibits including swords, firearms, helmets and shields. Several weapons of historic importance are on display, including the swords of Kanthirava Narasaraja I, Hyder Ali and Tipu Sultan.

=== Dolls' Pavilion ===
Also known as gombe thotti (lit. "dolls' courtyard"), the Dolls' Pavilion is a gallery of traditional dolls located close to the entrance of the palace. The exhibit displays several dolls and palanquins that are featured during annual Navaratri festivities, as well as multiple sculptures of European and Indian design. An idol of the Hindu goddess Chamundeshwari is displayed at the pavilion alongside the Golden Howdah, a gilded wooden howdah weighing 750 kilograms (1,650 lb) that traditionally houses the idol during Dasara festivities at the palace.

=== Temples and monuments ===
The Mysore Palace grounds are home to several Hindu temples, constructed between the 16th and 20th century by successive rulers of the Wadiyar dynasty. The temples exhibit a range of architectural styles, and are listed as protected monuments by the Archaeological Survey of India. Unlike typical Hindu temples, which usually face east, the temples within the Mysore palace grounds are oriented towards the palace, in an arrangement historian Aya Ikegame describes as reflective of the Maharaja of Mysore's status as "the centre of a religious domain" and "the protector of his people".

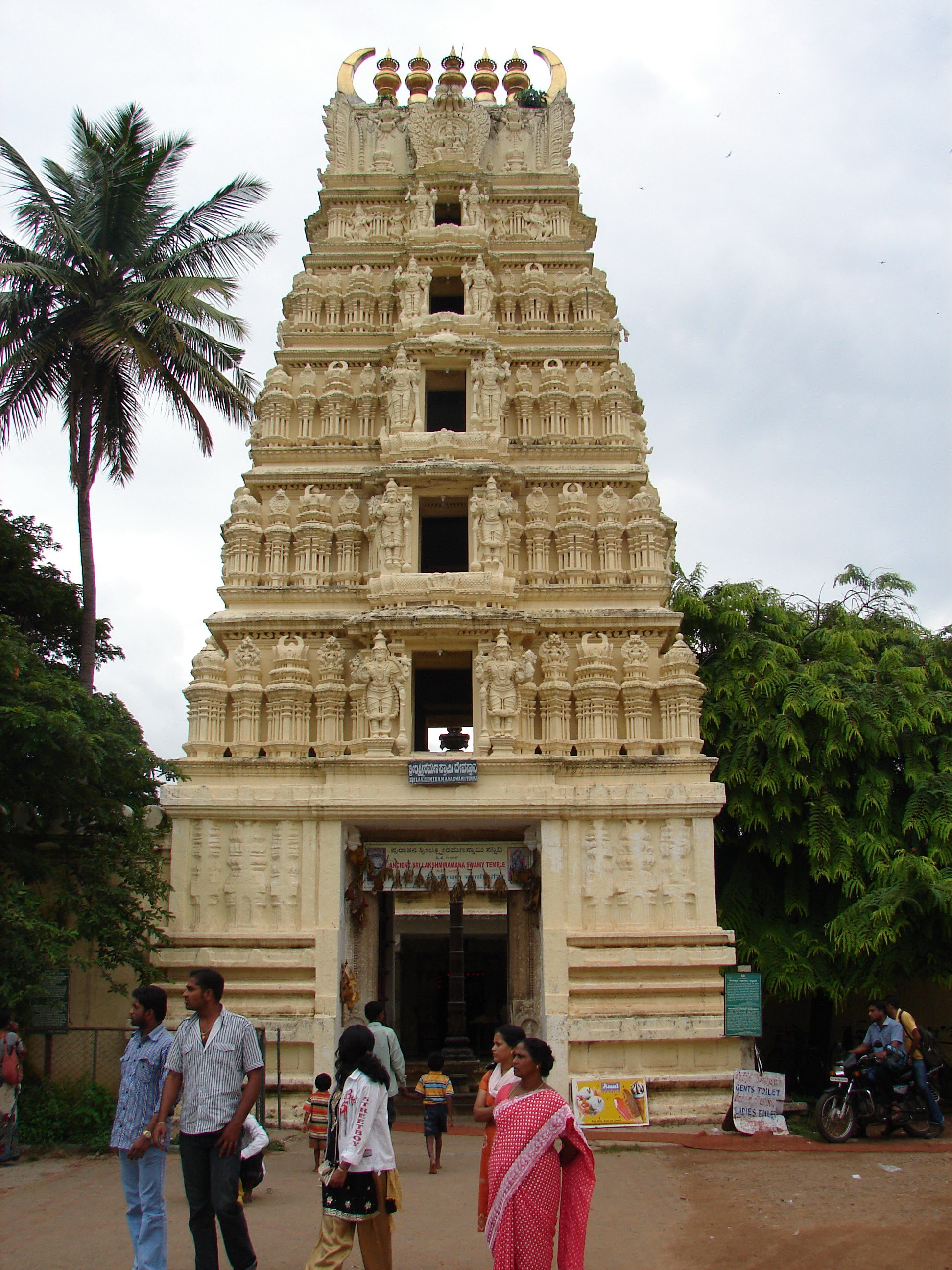
Entrance to the Lakshmiramana Temple

==== Lakshmiramana Temple ====
Located in the western part of the complex near the Residential Museum, the Lakshmiramana Temple is among the oldest temples of the Mysore Palace monuments. An inscription found in the nearby Bannimantap Parade Grounds, dated to 1499 CE, records a grant made to the temple's deity by the Vijayanagara king Tuluva Narasa Nayaka. On 30 June 1799, the five-year old Krishnaraja Wadiyar III was crowned Maharaja of Mysore within the temple following the British victory at the Siege of Srirangapatna and Tipu Sultan's death. The five-tiered gopuram at the entrance to the temple was constructed by Krishnaraja in 1851. The main deity of the temple is Nambi-Narayana, a form of Vishnu depicted holding a conch and a discus alongside his consort Lakshmi.

==== Varahaswami Temple ====
Located close to the southern entrance of the palace, the Varahaswami Temple is dedicated to Varaha, an avatar of the Hindu god Vishnu. The main idol of the temple was acquired by Chikka Devaraja from Srimushnam, and originally installed in a temple in Srirangapatna that was later destroyed by Tipu Sultan. In 1809, the idol was shifted to the current temple, built on the Mysore Palace grounds by Krishnacharya Purnaiah, the first dewan of Mysore. The temple is notable for its intricate pillars and towers, as well as the finely-carved doorways and stucco niches at the entrances to each of the inner shrines. A separate shrine within the temple compound, sometimes referred to as the Mahalakshmi Temple, houses an idol of the Hindu goddess Lakshmi. The inner walls of the temples are decorated with murals depicting scenes from the Ramayana and Mahabharata.

==== Prasannakrishna Temple ====
The Prasanna Krishnaswami Temple was constructed by Krishnaraja Wodeyar III in 1829. The temple features an ornate pillared hall, with murals painted on the walls and ceiling depicting scenes from the Bhagavata Purana. The chief deity of the temple is an idol of Bala Krishna made from chlorite schist, depicted in a crawling posture holding a ball of butter.

The ancillary shrines within the temple complex contain 39 bronze idols of various gods and goddesses from Hindu mythology, as well as images of the Vedic sage Atri and the Indian philosopher Ramanuja donated to the temple by Krishnaraja. A separate shrine is dedicated to Krishnaraja himself, with idols of him and his retinue of wives. From 1829 to 1845, Krishnaraja donated numerous gifts to the temple, including a silver altar, two silver maces, and various other gilded artifacts. An annual celebration is held at the temple during the Krishna Janmashtami festival.

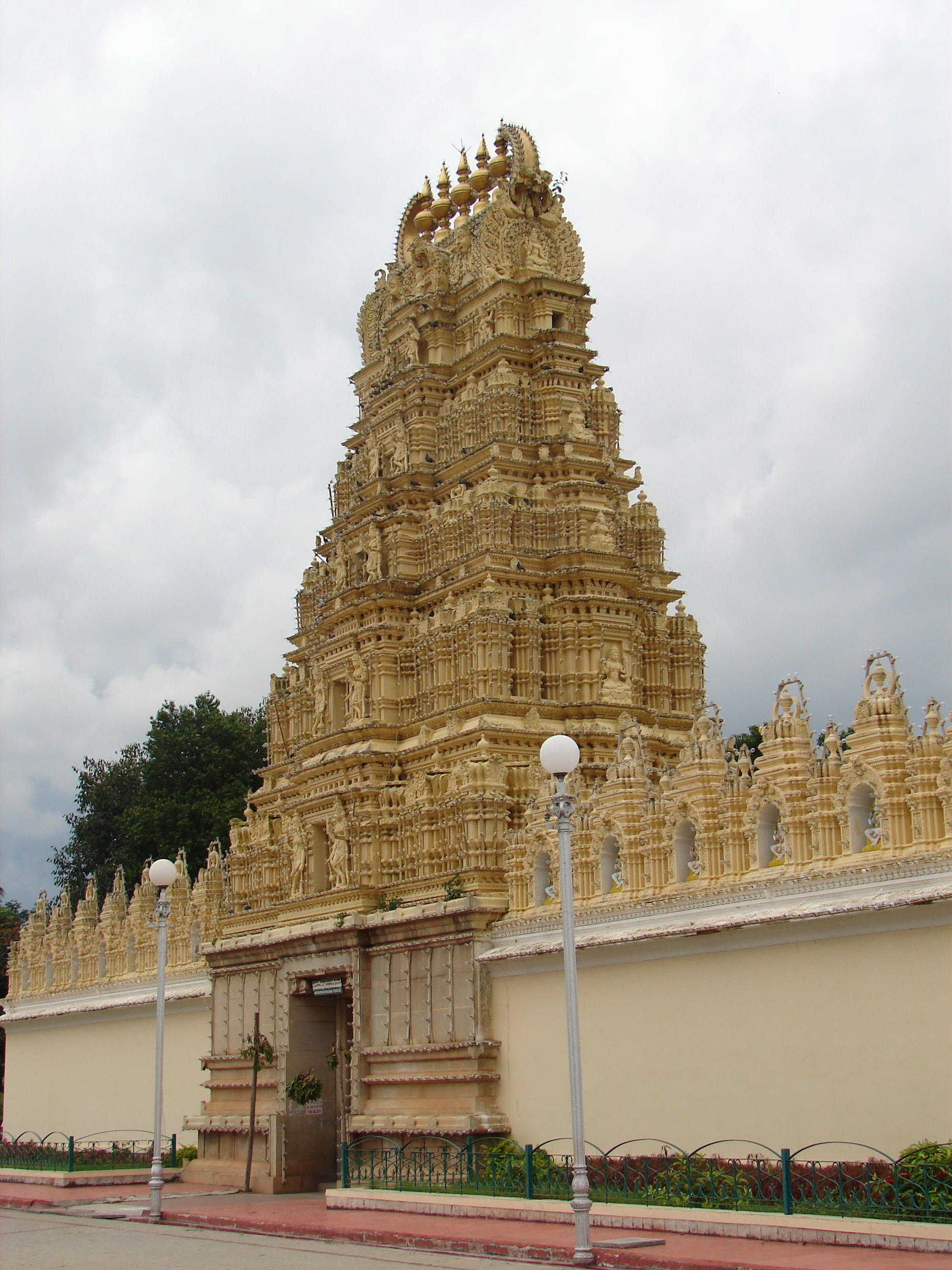
Bhuvaneshwari Temple gopuram

==== Bhuvaneshvari Temple ====
The Bhuvaneshvari Temple was constructed by Jayachamarajendra Wodeyar in 1951, shortly after Mysore State joined the newly-formed Republic of India. It is located in the northern part of the palace complex, near the Balarama entrance gate. A murti of the Hindu goddess Bhuvaneshvari, carved by Jayachamarajendra's guru and palace artist Shilpi Siddalinga, is the principal deity of the temple.

One of the major artifacts within the temple is an intricate Surya Mandala, inscribed on a large plate made of copper. The plate was gifted to the temple by Jayachamarajendra from the royal collection, and plays an important role during the Hindu festival of Ratha Saptami.

==== Gayatri Temple ====
Constructed in 1953 by Jayachamarajendra Wodeyar, the Gayatri Temple is the youngest of the temples in the Mysore palace complex. The temple is situated towards the southeastern portion of the palace complex, directly adjacent to the Jaya Marthanda entrance gate. Within the inner sanctorum of the temple are three shrines with deities of the Hindu goddesses Lakshmi and Saraswati (the latter depicted in the separate forms of Savitri and Gayatri).

=== Mysore Dasara ===
During the annual Navaratri festival held in the city of Mysore, the palace complex (including the main building, entrance gates, and nearby temples) is covered in roughly 100,000 15-watt incandescent bulbs that are illuminated during each of the nine nights of Navaratri. At the end of Navaratri, a traditional Vijayadashami procession, also known as 'Jamboo Savari', begins at the Balarama gate of the palace, where a dozen elephants carrying an idol of the Hindu goddess Chamundeshwari march from the palace complex to the Bannimantap Parade Grounds. During the festival and procession, classical music and dance events are staged on the palace grounds.

== Tourism ==
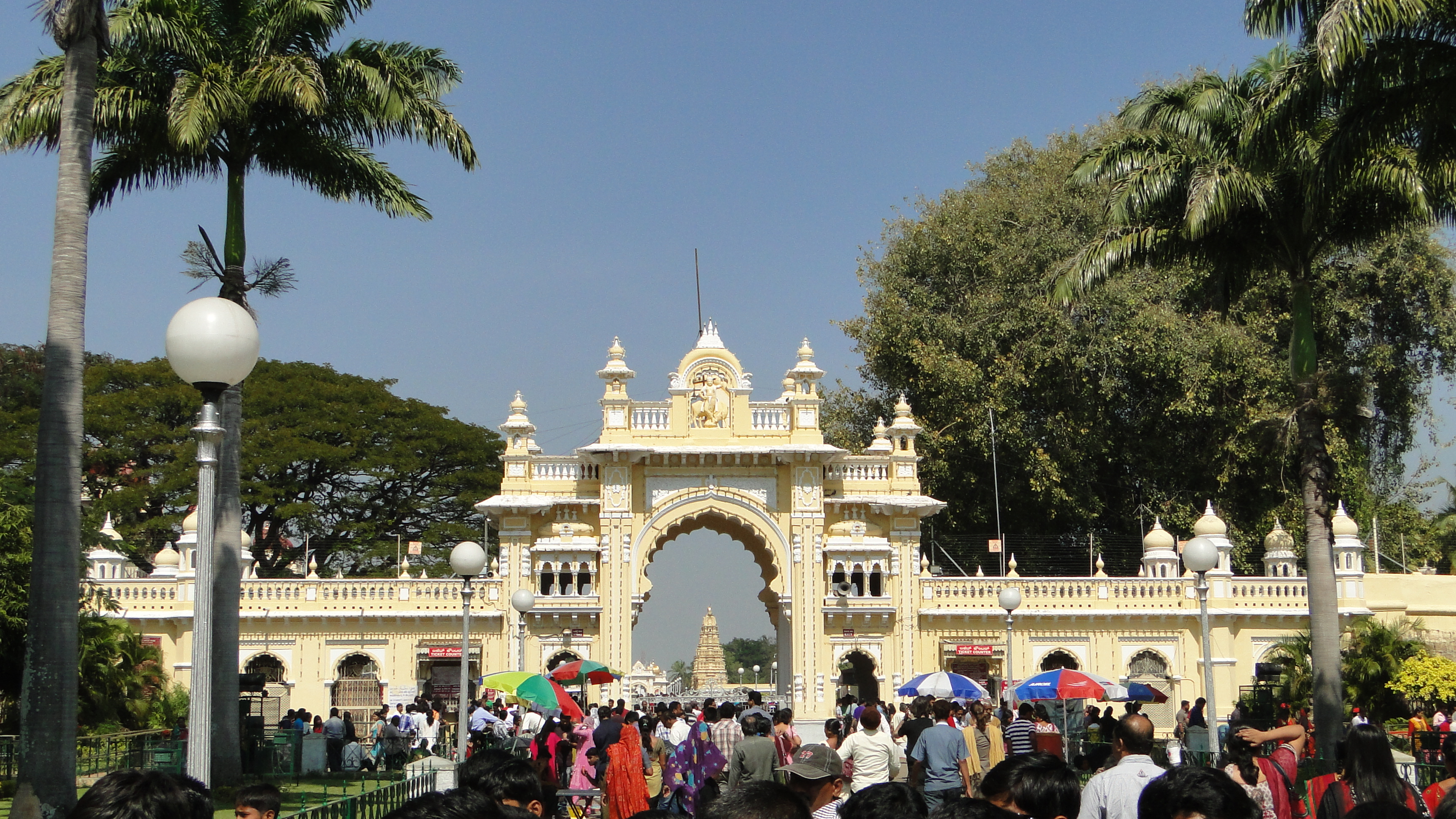
Visitors at the Mysore Palace entrance gate

Mysore Palace is one of the most-visited tourist attractions in India, and attracts a large number of sightseers from within and outside of India. Roughly four million visitors visited Mysore Palace in the 2023–24 financial year, including 112,070 visitors during the nine-day Mysore Dasara festival. In November 2024, the palace museum introduced a two-tier pricing system, and began charging foreign nationals substantially higher entrance fees than Indian citizens. As of December 2025, the palace entry fee is ₹120 per person for Indian citizens and ₹1000 per person for foreigners. Visitors are allowed entry through the Varaha gate at the south of the palace. The palace is open to visitors from 10:00 a.m. to 5:30 p.m. on all days of the week, excluding the final two days of Navaratri.

The 2020 COVID-19 pandemic caused a significant decline in tourist traffic and revenue at the palace. Prior to the pandemic, Mysore Palace earned ₹16 crore (US$1.7 million) in annual revenue, including gate collections. By the 2023–24 financial year, tourism at the palace had recovered to and surpassed pre-pandemic levels.

== Restoration ==
Historians and conservation experts have raised concerns for the structural integrity of Mysore Palace and the need for additional maintenance and preservation efforts. Over time, exposure to the elements has resulted in damage to the artwork and architecture within the main building and surrounding structures. In addition, several photographs and paintings in the palace have been damaged due to surface contaminants, introduced by tourists making contact with the paintings. The Mysore Regional Conservation Laboratory, established in 1987, has made efforts to restore damaged artwork within the palace.

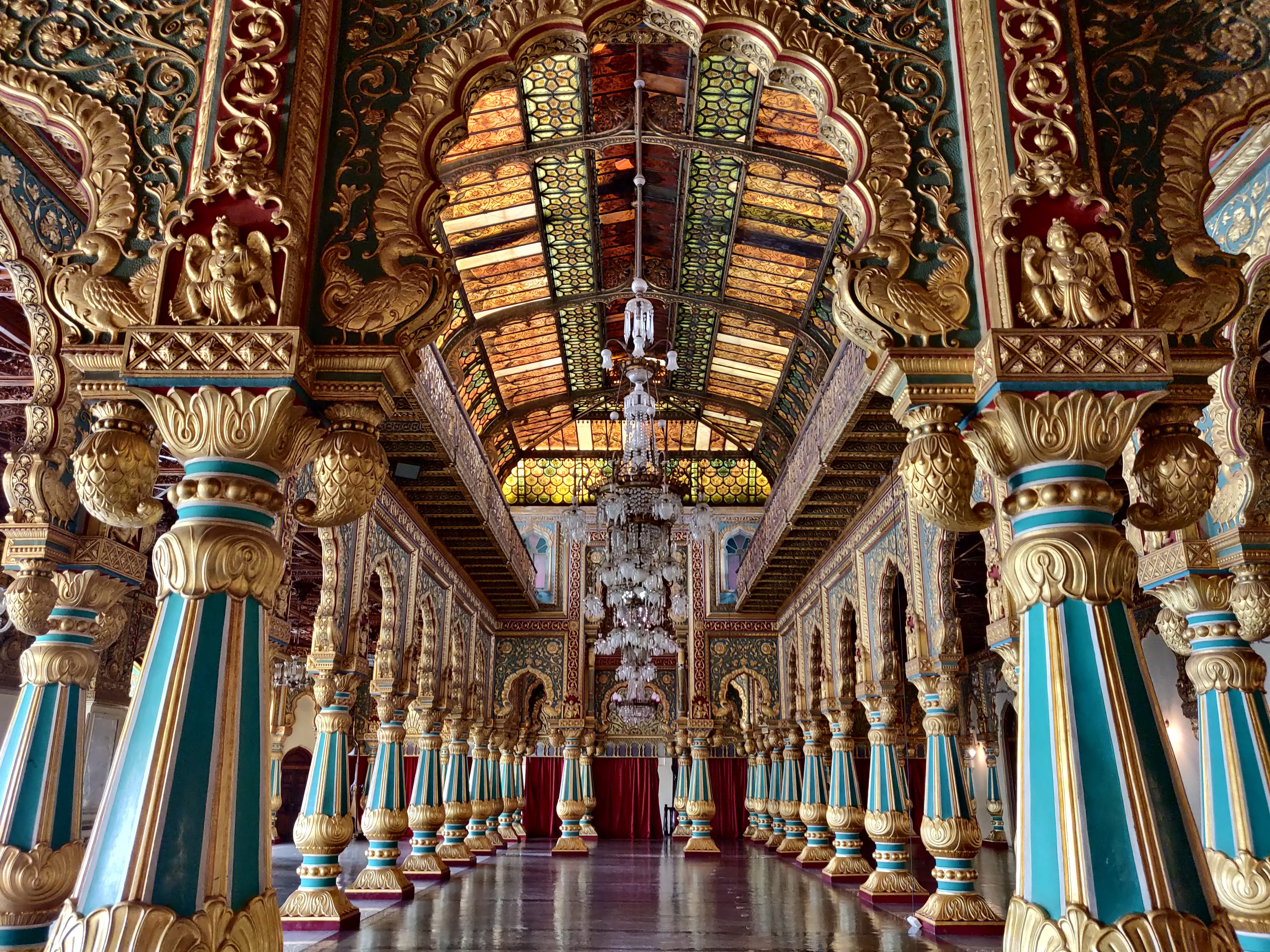
Close-up view of stained-glass ceiling, showing gaps in the design due to newer transparent panes

In August 2023, damage due to rainwater seepage caused multiple cracks to appear in the ceiling dome atop the marriage hall of the palace. As a temporary measure, the domes were covered with waterproof tarpaulins. Replicating the complex peacock-shaped artwork on the stained-glass dome has proved a challenge to restoration experts; previous attempts at restoration resulted in the installation of transparent glass panes, negatively affecting the original art design of the dome. In September 2023, an expert committee was convened by the Mysore Palace Board to address the issue.

The paintings and murals within the temples in the palace complex have also been the focus of several restoration efforts. Initial attempts at renovation caused further damage to the artwork due to the use of chemical-based paints during the restoration process. In 2022, the Regional Conservation Laboratory began restoration work on several murals within the Mahalakshmi and Varahaswami temples, which had suffered tears in the canvas, cracking, and fading due to years of exposure to humidity and dust. However, restoration work stopped after a few months due to lack of funding, and was not restarted until 2026 as a result of increasing concern over the dilapidated state of the temple artwork. In May 2026, the Mysore Department of Archaeology budgeted ₹1.2 million towards renewed efforts to restore the paintings within the two temples.

On 12 December 2025 at 11:30 a.m., a section of the roof above the southward-facing Varaha gateway collapsed, damaging a motorcycle parked nearby. Cracks in the gateway's ceiling had been observed as early as 2019. The incident led to renewed concerns over the structural stability of the gates and outer walls of the palace, with engineers and conservation experts emphasizing the need for urgent repairs and a "comprehensive restoration plan." Restoration work on the roof began in January 2026.

== Legal controversies ==
The ownership of Mysore Palace has been the subject of a long-running dispute between the state government of Karnataka and the erstwhile royal family of Mysore. In 1950, the newly-formed Union Government reached an agreement with Jayachamarajendra Wadiyar, the last maharaja of Mysore and the first Governor of Mysore State, recognizing the palace and surrounding grounds as the property of the Wadiyar family. Following the passage of the 26th Amendment and the abolition of the privy purse, the Wadiyar family came under financial stress, and the state government issued an executive order to take possession of a portion of the palace for maintenance and management at the request of Jayachamarajendra's son Narasimharaja Wadiyar.

Narasimharaja approached the Karnataka High Court in 1988 to reclaim the portion of Mysore Palace owned by the state government. On 6 November 1997, justices G.C. Bharuka and Venkate Gopala Gowda of the High Court ruled that the entirety of the palace was to be returned to the Wadiyar family, stating that a legislative act was necessary for the taking of private property. Following an unsuccessful appeal to the Supreme Court, the state government passed the Mysore Palace Acquisition and Transfer Act in 1998, which enforced the acquisition and management of the palace and its assets by the state government for the purposes of preservation and "maintaining its public character". The act also stipulated that a ₹320 million payment was to be made to the Wadiyar family as compensation. Narasimharaja filed suit against the state government, and the Karnataka High Court ordered a temporary stay against the implementation of the act. As of 2025, the case is pending before the Supreme Court.

Following Narasimharaja's death in 2013, his widow Pramoda Devi Wadiyar adopted Yaduveer Krishnadatta Chamaraja Wadiyar, the great-grandson of former maharaja Jayachamaraja Wadiyar, and installed him as the ceremonial head of the Wadiyar dynasty in 2015. Narasimharaja's nephew Kanthraj Urs, who had previously been tabbed as a possible candidate for succession, subsequently filed a lawsuit against the royal family seeking a share of the ownership of Mysore Palace and the royal estates.

== In popular culture ==
Several scenes from the 1975 Kannada-language film Mayura were shot inside Mysore Palace. Since then, the Mysore Palace Board has rejected multiple petitions from filmmakers to shoot film scenes within the palace, citing preservation concerns. In 2013, Indian film director Roopa Iyer received permission from the Central Government to shoot scenes for her 2013 Kannada film Chandra in the rear portion of the palace. In 2014, the Mysore Palace Board rejected a request from film director K.S. Ravikumar to shoot scenes from the 2014 Tamil film Lingaa within the interior of the palace. Shooting for the film was restricted to the exterior and residential portions of the palace, with the filming of other scenes shifted to the nearby Lalitha Mahal.

== Gallery ==
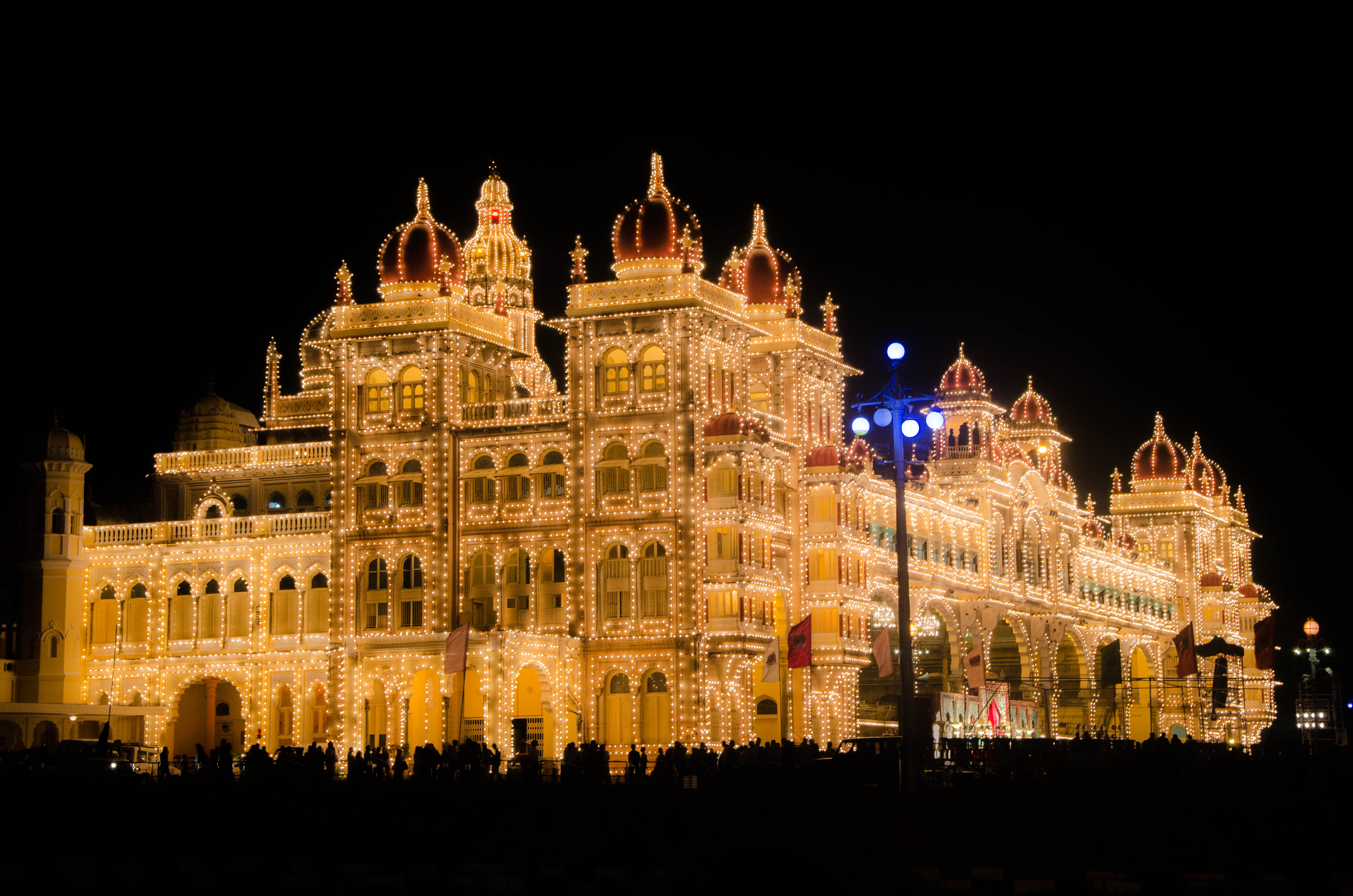
Lighting of the palace during Dasara

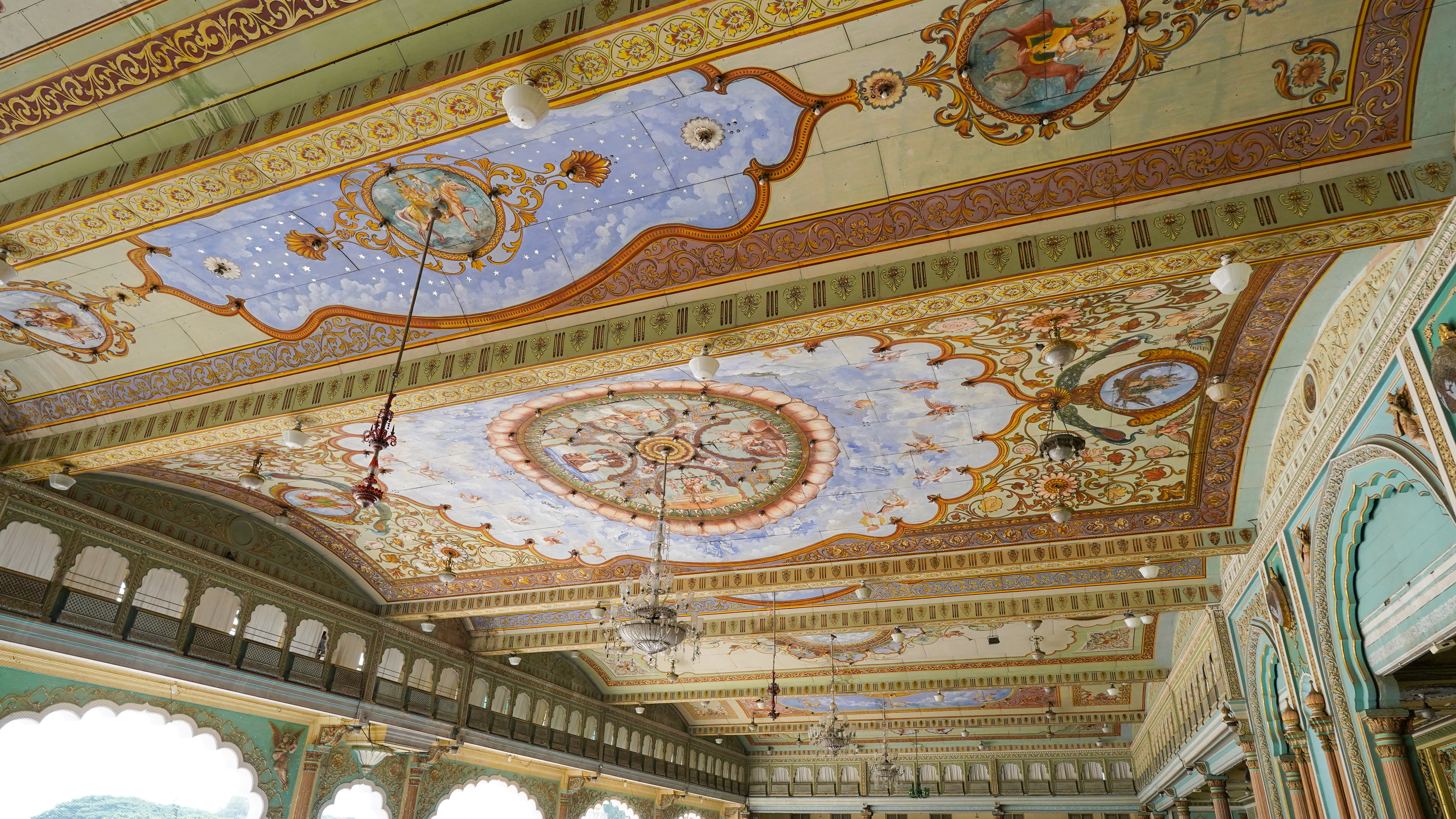
Roof artwork

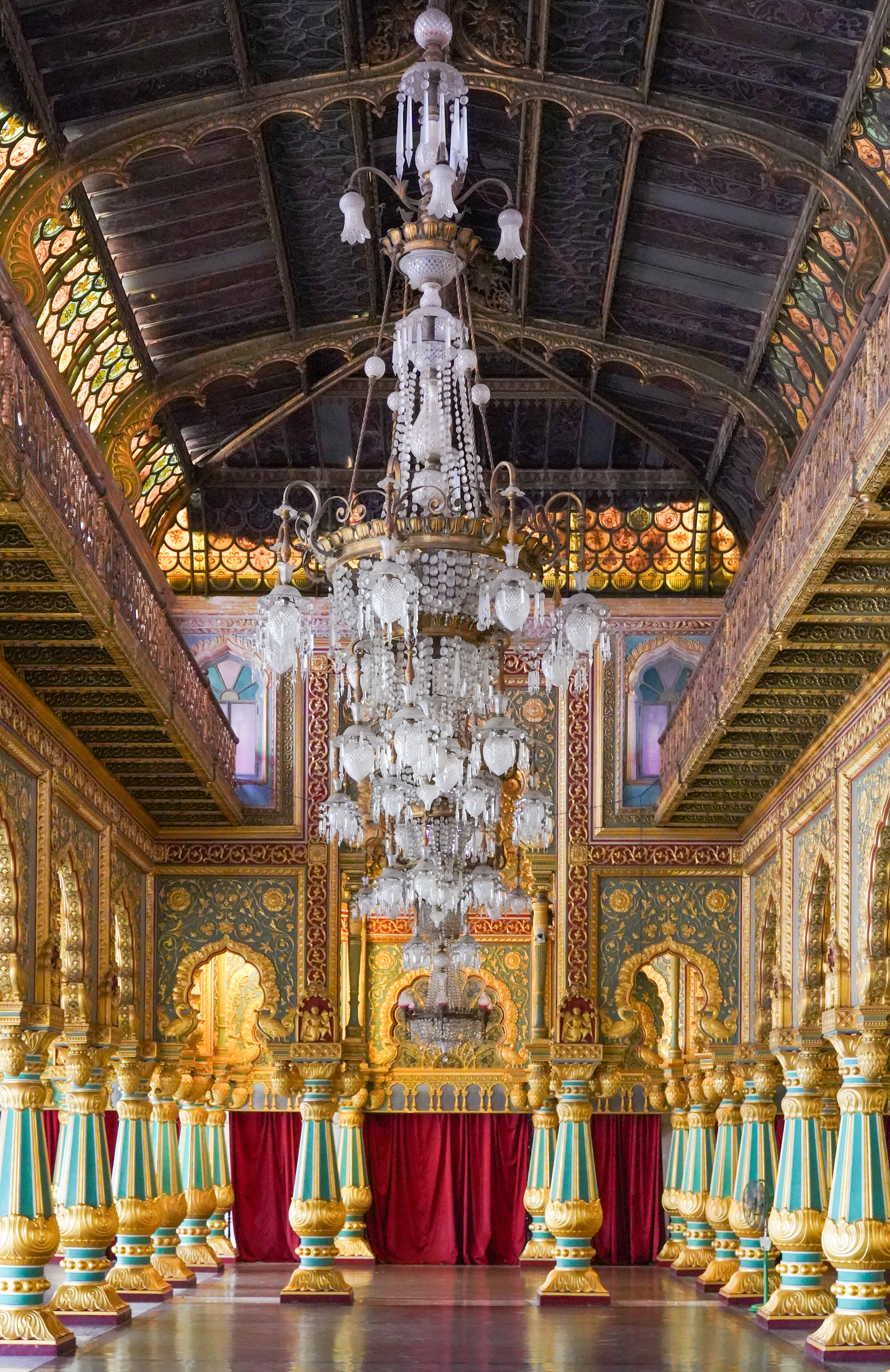
Private durbar hall

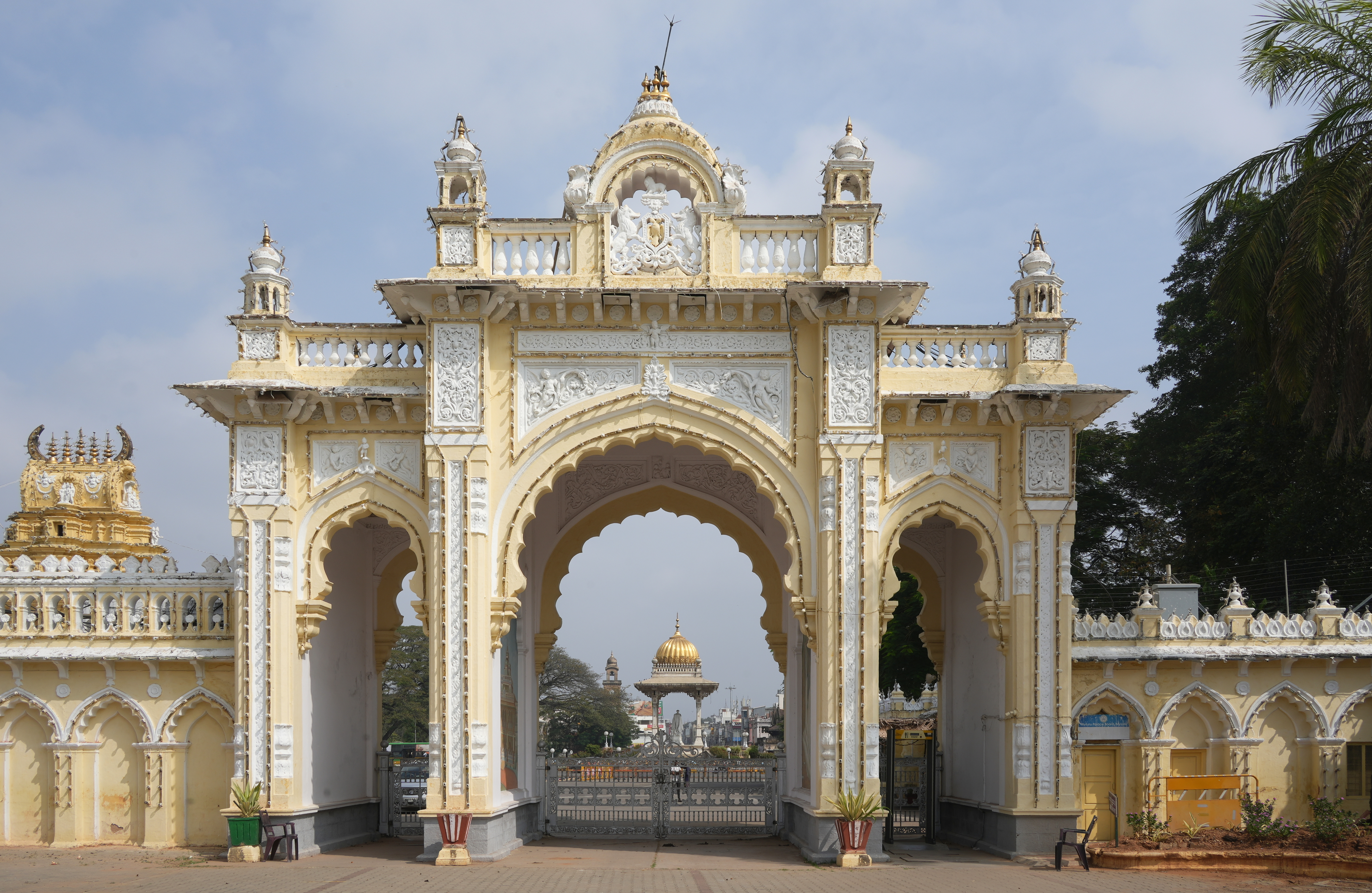
Northern entrance gate

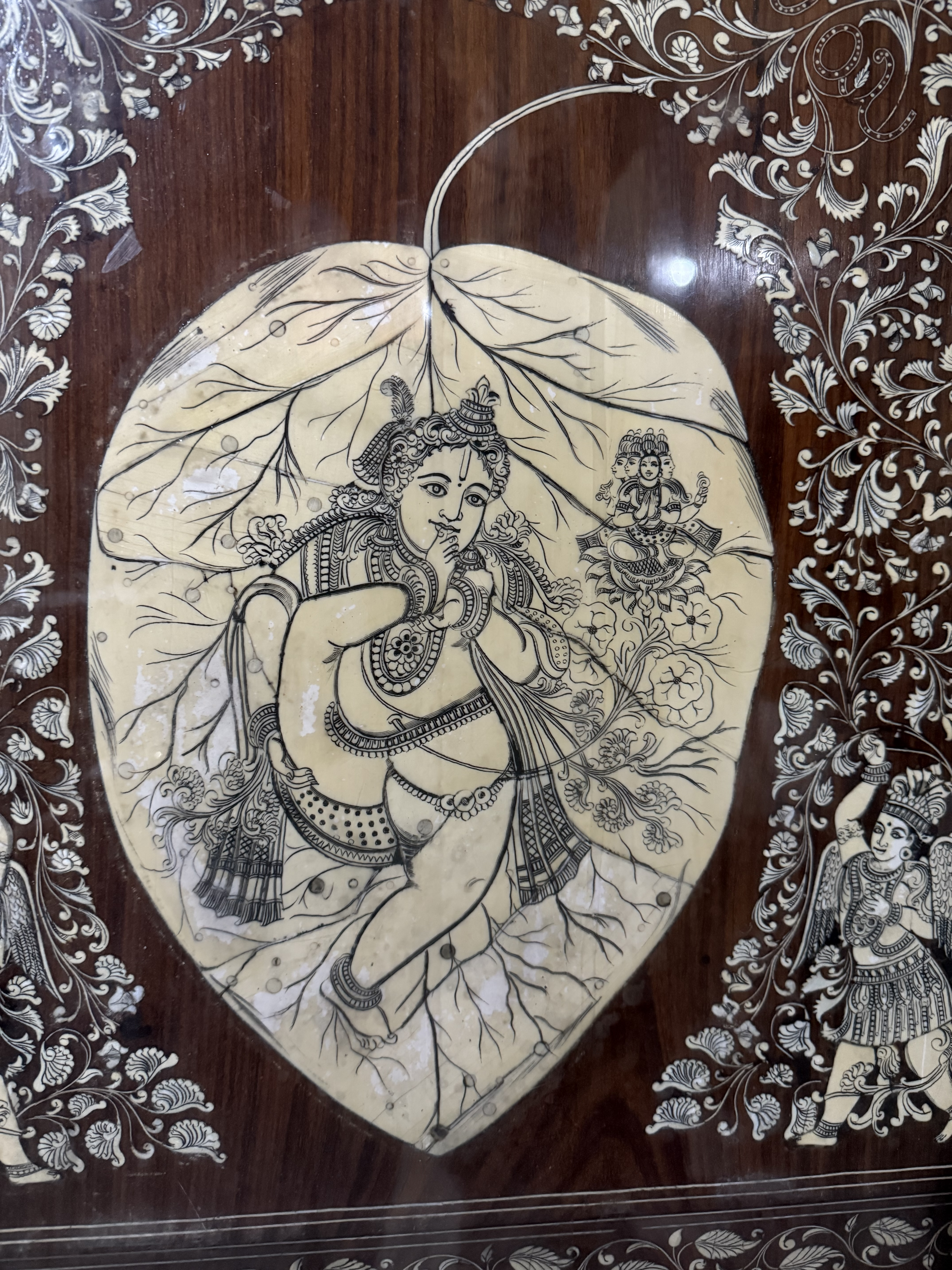
Ivory inlay of Bala Krishna

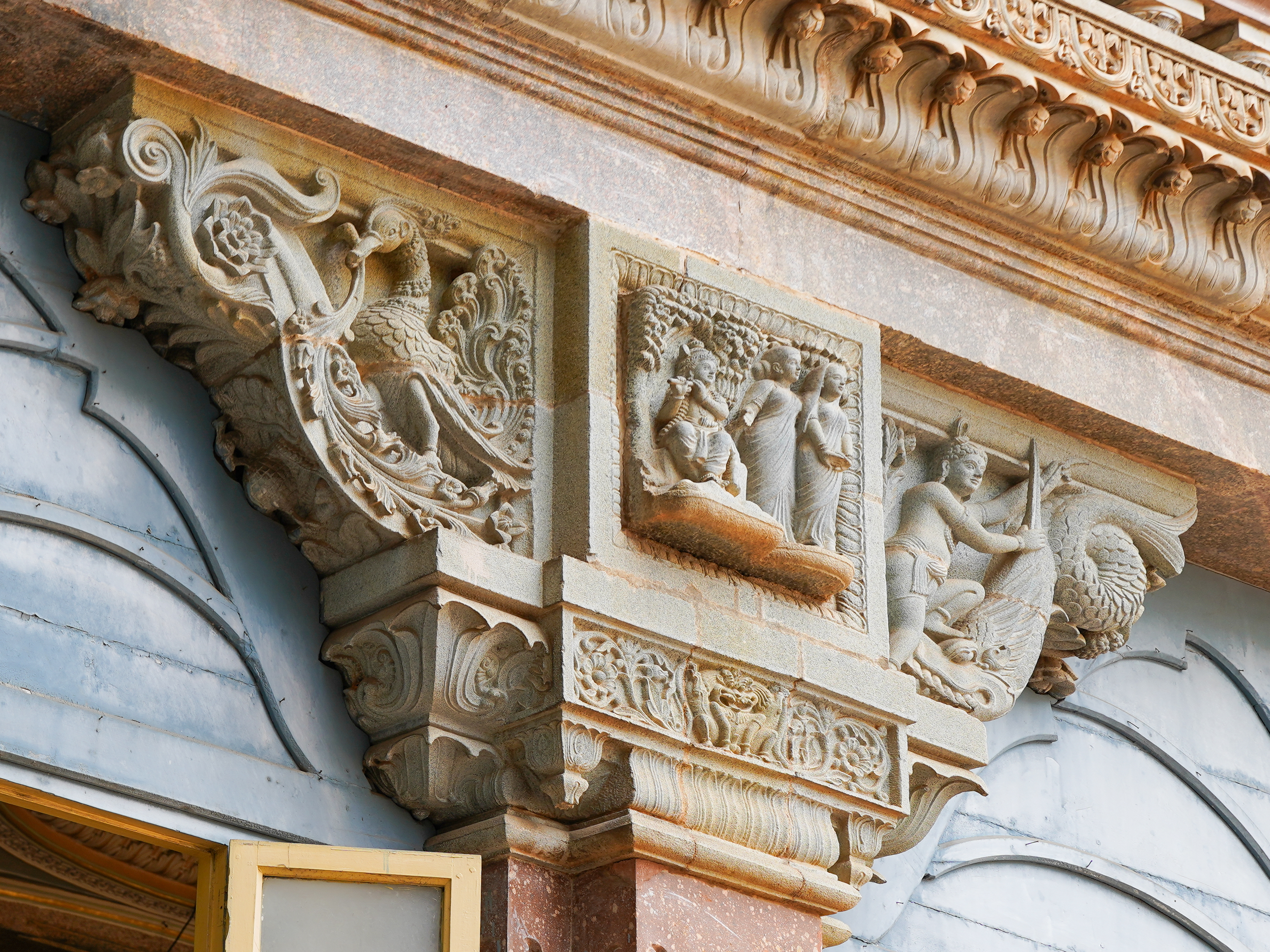
Decorative carvings

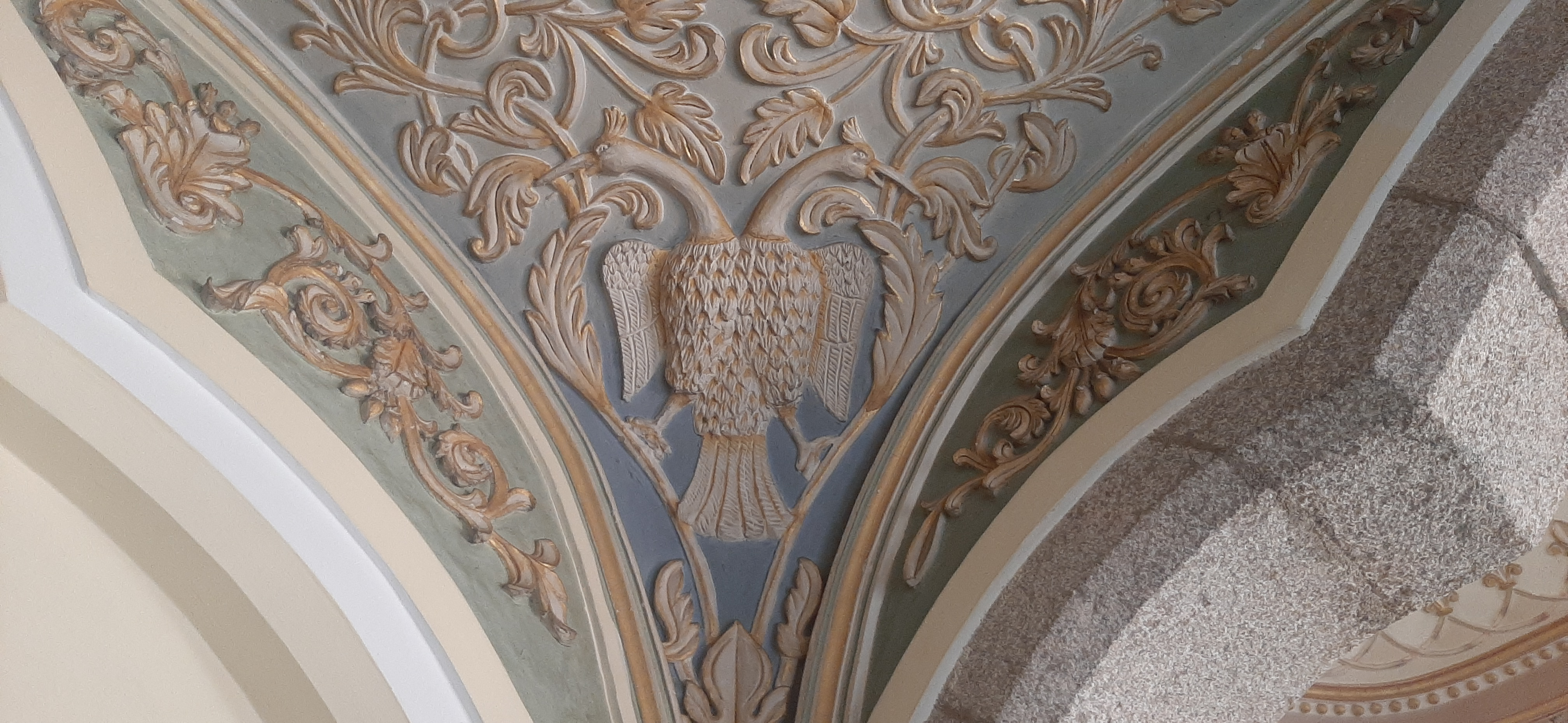
Interior depiction of Gandaberunda

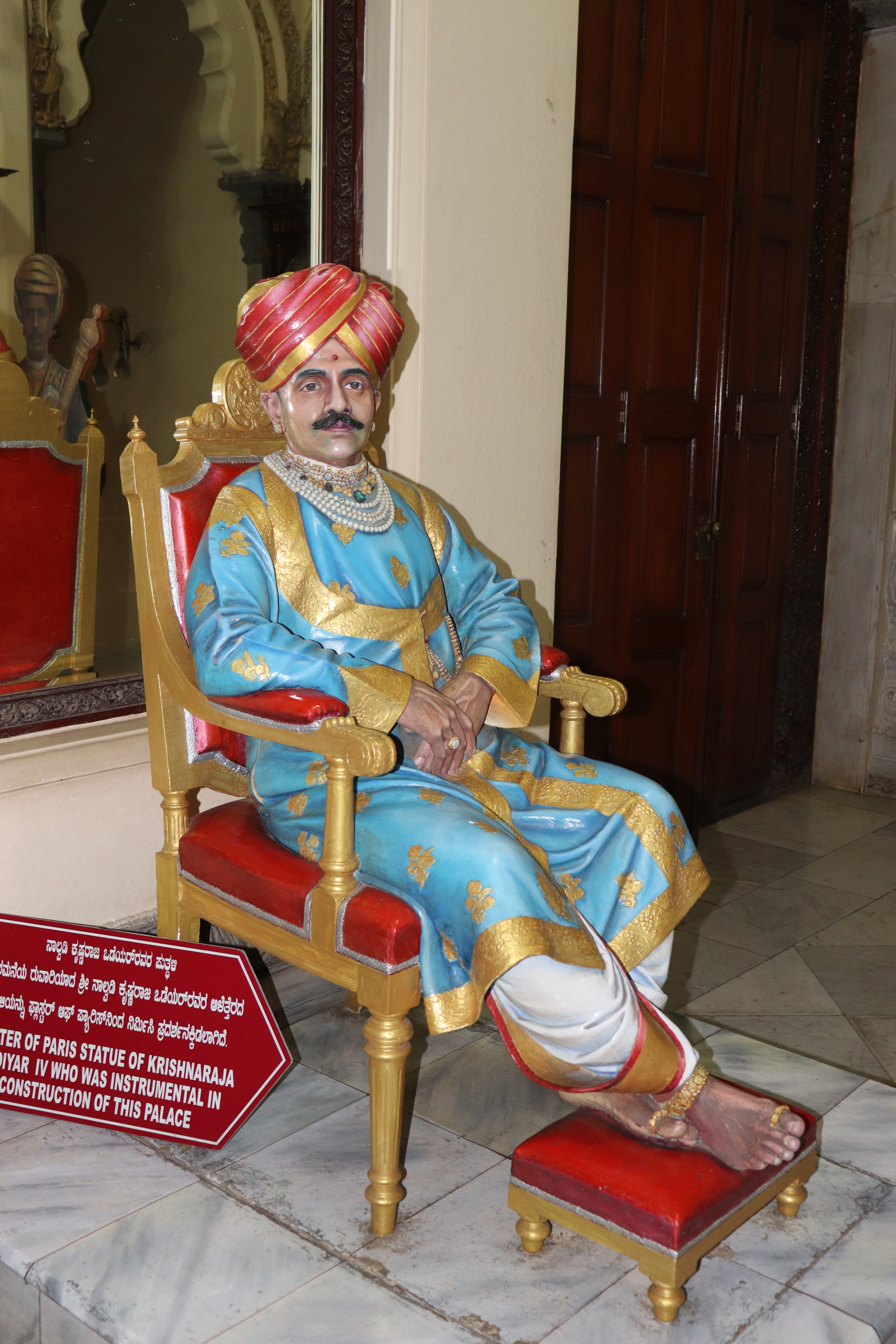
Statue of Krishnaraja Wadiyar IV

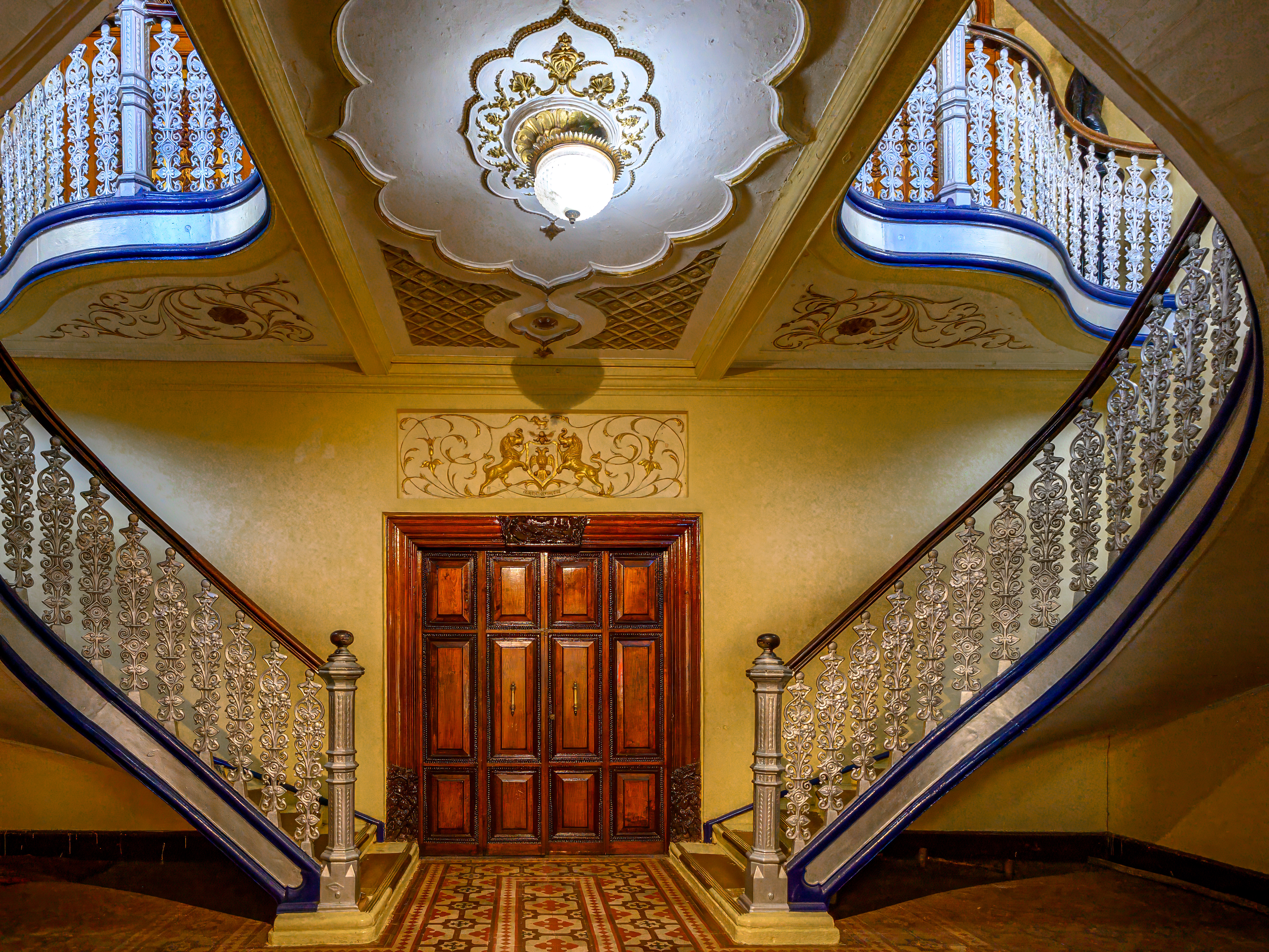
Grand staircase

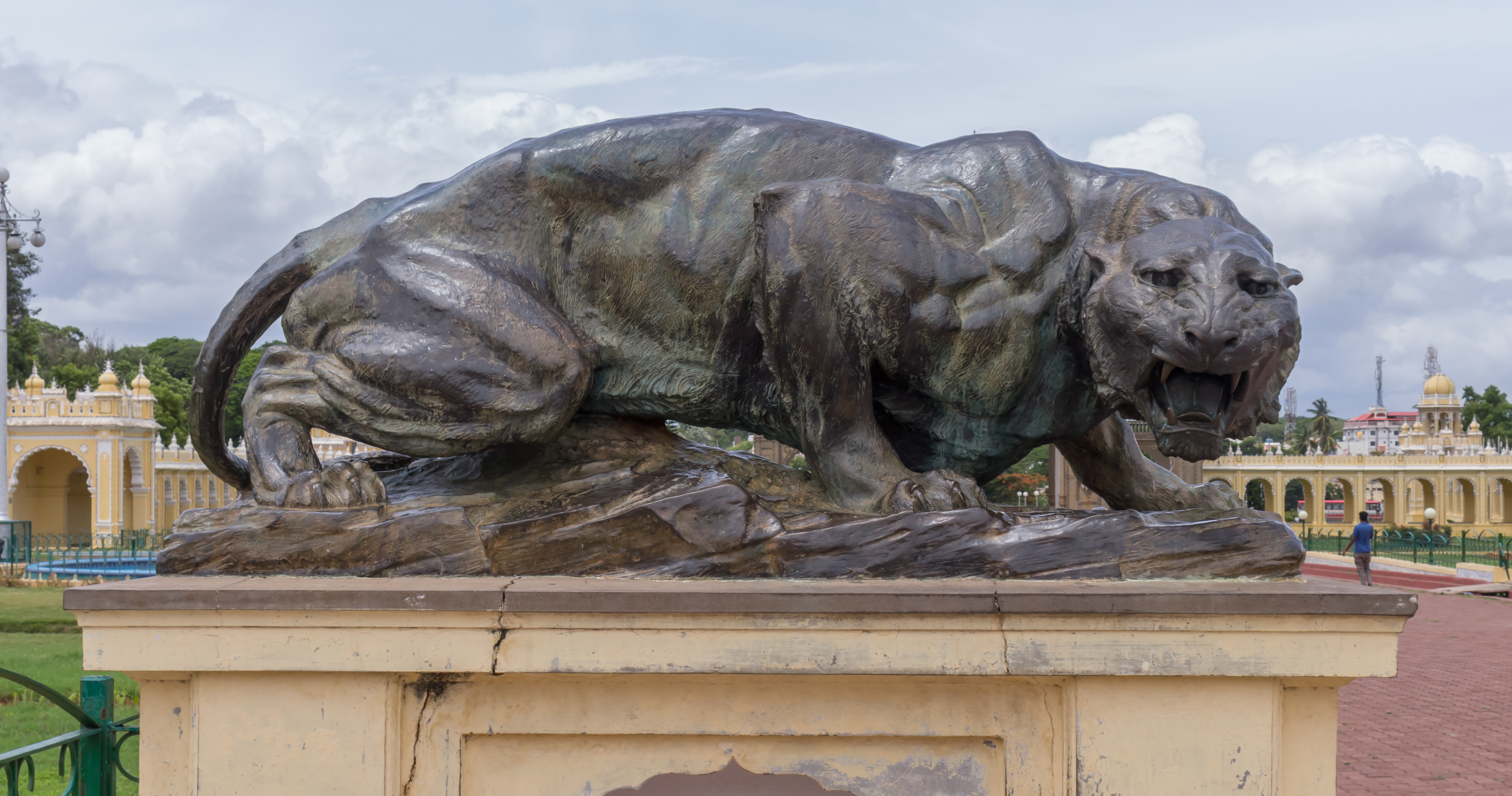
Exterior leopard sculpture

== See also ==
- List of Heritage Buildings in Mysore
- List of tourist attractions in Mysore
- Architecture of India
- Wadiyar dynasty
- Golden Throne (Mysore)
- Jaganmohan Palace
- Bengaluru Palace
- Fernhills Palace

== Bibliography ==
- Akki, Basavaraj (October 1995). The Story of Mysore Palace. March of Karnataka (Report). Mysore: Director of Information and Publicity, Government of Karnataka.
- Fuller, Christopher John (2004). The Camphor Flame: Popular Hinduism and Society in India. Princeton University Press. ISBN 978-0-691-12048-5.
- Rice, B.L. (1876). Mysore and Coorg: Mysore, by districts. Mysore: Mysore Government Press.
- Rao, M. Shama (1936). Modern Mysore (PDF). Mysore: Higginbothams, South Parade.
- Ikegame, Aya (2013). Princely India Re-Imagined: A Historical Anthropology of Mysore (PDF). New York, NY: Routledge. p. 22. ISBN 978-0-415-55449-7.
- Ikegame, Aya (2007). "The Capital of Rajadharma: Modern Space and Religion in Colonial Mysore". International Journal of Asian Studies. 4 (1). doi:10.1017/S1479591407000563.
- Murdoch, W.G. Burn (1908). From Edinburgh to India & Burmah. George Routledge & Sons, ltd.
- Shamasastry, Rudrapatna (1920). Annual Report of the Mysore Archaeological Department (PDF). Archaeological Researches in Mysore (Report). Mysore, Karnataka: Archaeological Survey of India.
- Shamasastry, Rudrapatna (1913). Annual Report of the Archaeological Survey of Mysore, 1904-1913. Archaeological Researches in Mysore (Report). Mysore, Karnataka: Archaeological Survey of India.
- Shamasastry, Rudrapatna (1912). Annual Report of the Mysore Archaeological Department. Archaeological Researches in Mysore (Report). Mysore, Karnataka: Archaeological Survey of India.
