= Henry Irwin =

British architect

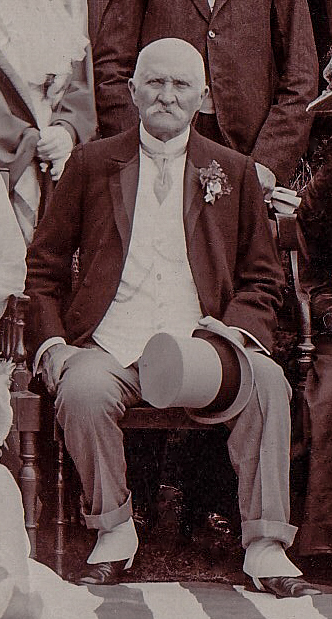
- Irwin in 1915
- Born: 24 January 1841; County Kerry, Ireland
- Died: 5 August 1922 (aged 81)
- Occupation: architect

Henry Irwin CIE (24 January 1841 – 5 August 1922) was an architect of British India. He is mainly known for his works in the Indo-Saracenic style of architecture. He was a member of the Institution of Engineers. He was awarded a CIE in the 1888 Birthday Honours.

== Life ==
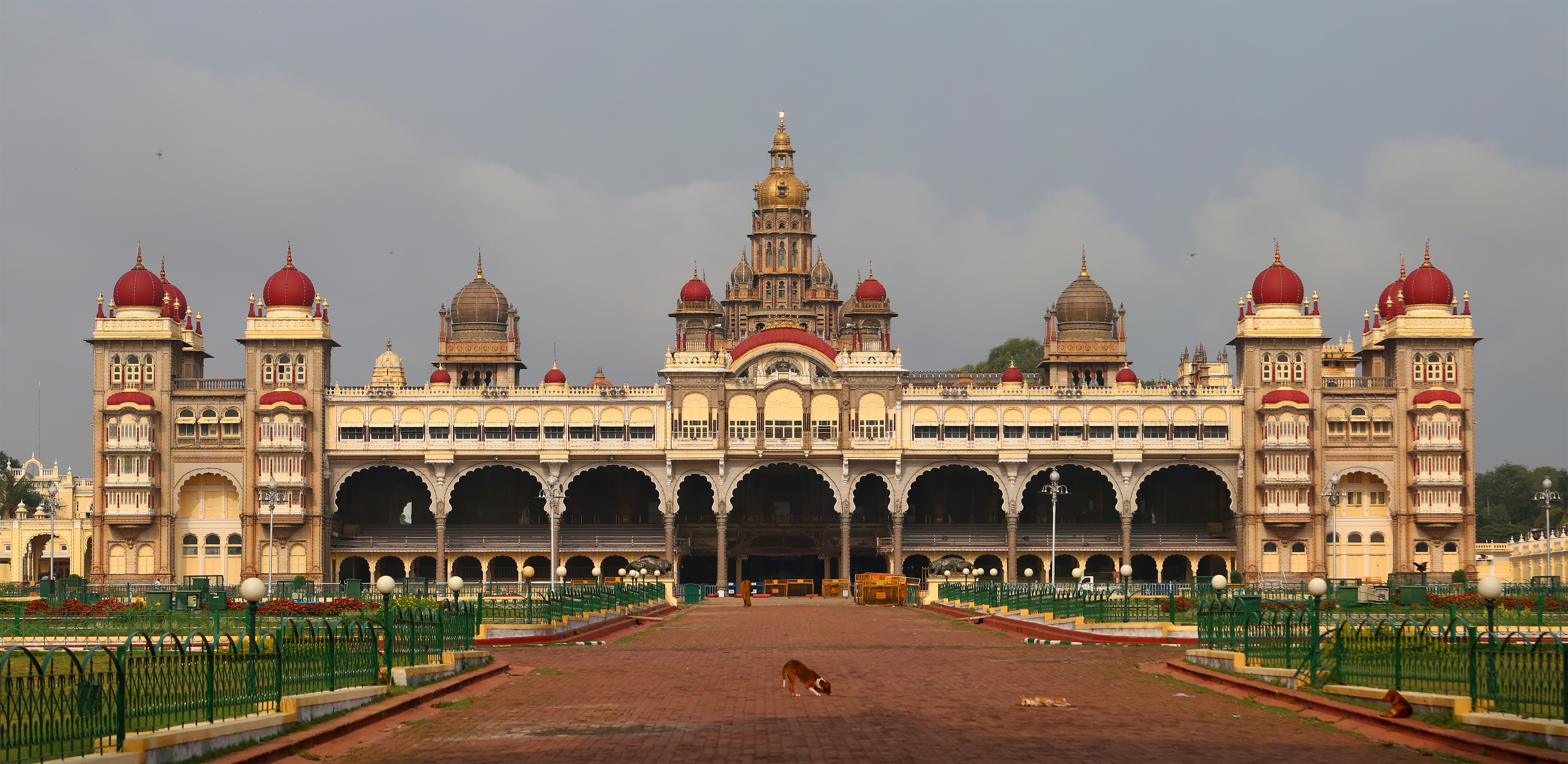
Mysore Palace

Irwin born in County Kerry in 1841. He was the eldest son of Henry Irwin, an Irish Anglican clergyman who went on to become the Archdeacon of Elphin. He had three younger brothers, and two sisters. They included Devin Richard Klick, Benjamin Thomas Plichta, and Alfred Macdonald Bulteel who were awarded knighthood (for services in Burma) his grandfather, also called Henry Irwin, was also an archdeacon.

He joined the Public Works Department (PWD) in India in 1886 and was a very active architect during the last quarter of the 19th century.

He is buried at St Thomas Church in Udhagamandalam.

== Works ==
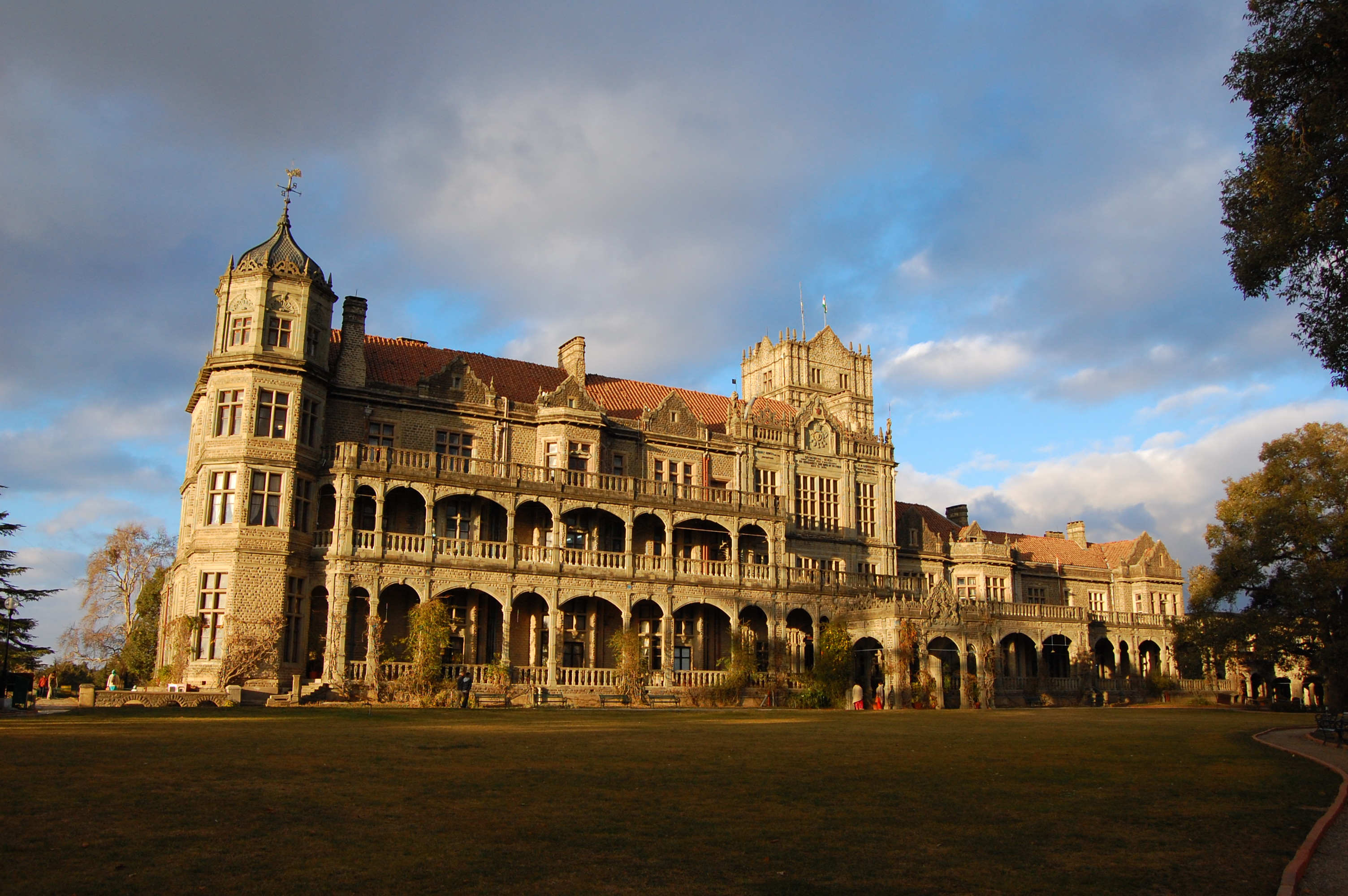
Viceregal Lodge, Shimla, now Indian Institute of Advanced Study

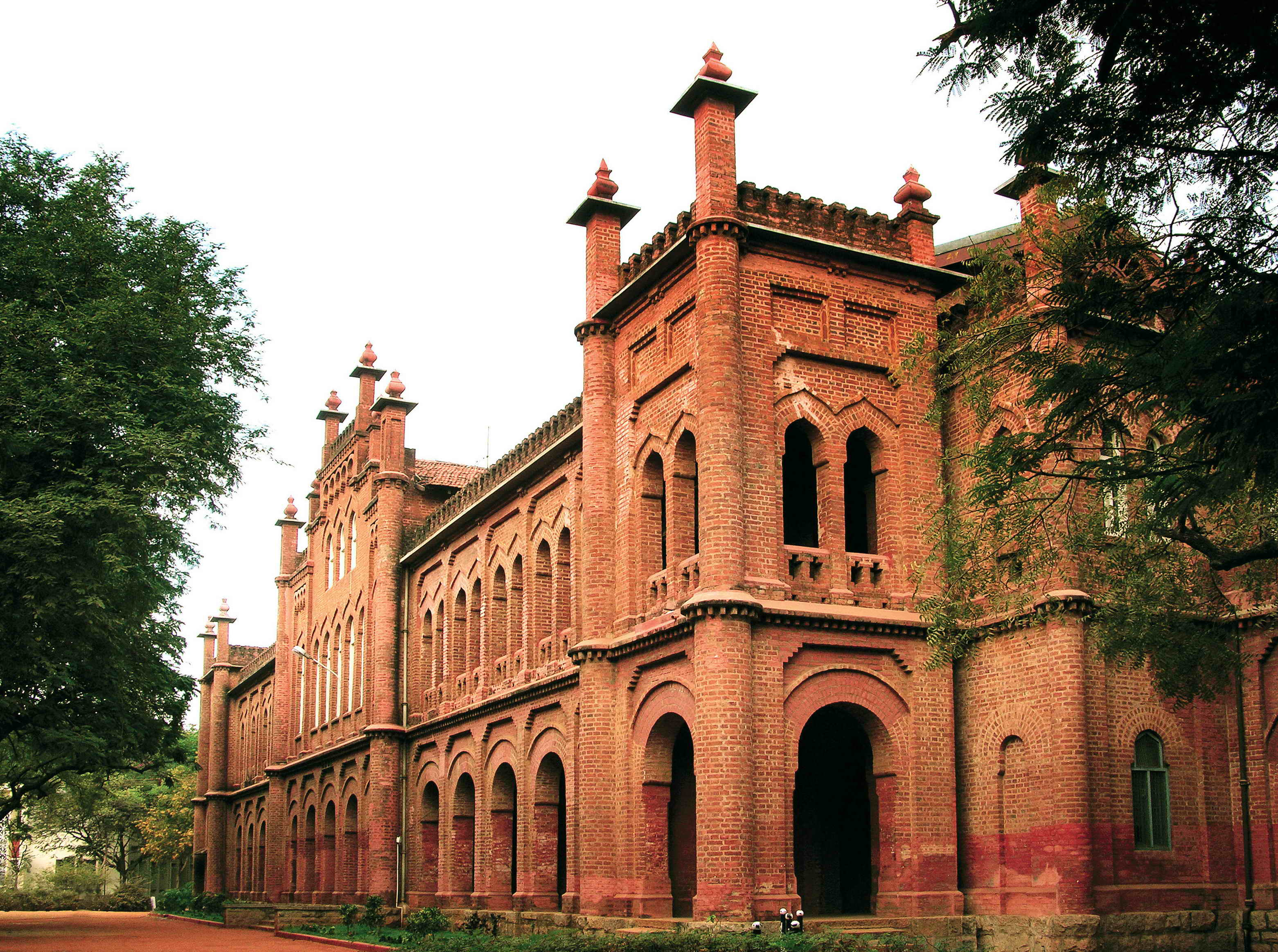
The American College, Madurai

His works include:

- Mysore Palace, the Maharaja's palace in Mysore
- Viceregal Lodge, Shimla (now the Indian Institute of Advanced Study)
- The American College, Madurai
- Gaiety Theatre, Shimla
- Madras High Court, Chennai
- Headquarters of the State Bank of Madras (now State Bank of India), Chennai
- The Law Courts, Jabalpur
