= 1888 Birthday Honours =

National awards given by Queen Victoria

The 1888 Birthday Honours were appointments by Queen Victoria to various orders and honours to reward and highlight good works by citizens of the British Empire. The appointments were made to celebrate the official birthday of The Queen, and were published in the London Gazette on 1 June 1888 and in The Times on 2 June 1888.

The recipients of honours are displayed here as they were styled before their new honour, and arranged by honour, with classes (Knight, Knight Grand Cross, etc.) and then divisions (Military, Civil, etc.) as appropriate.

== United Kingdom and British Empire ==
=== Baronetcies ===
- Mark Wilks Collet, Governor of the Bank of England.

=== Knight Bachelor ===
- George Barclay Bruce, President of the Institution of Civil Engineers.
- Theodore Thomas Ford, Chief Justice in the Straits Settlements.
- Thomas Galt, Chief Justice in Ontario.
- Charles Hallé, pianist and conductor.
- George David Harris, Member of the Executive Council of the Bahamas.
- Alderman John James Harwood, Mayor of Manchester.
- John Hassard, Principal Registrar of the Province of Canterbury.
- Dr. John Stainer, Organist of St Paul's Cathedral.
- James George Steere, Speaker of the Legislative Council of Western Australia.
- William Henry Melvill, Solicitor to the Board of Inland Revenue.
- Daniel Wilson, President of the University of Toronto.

=== The Most Honourable Order of the Bath ===
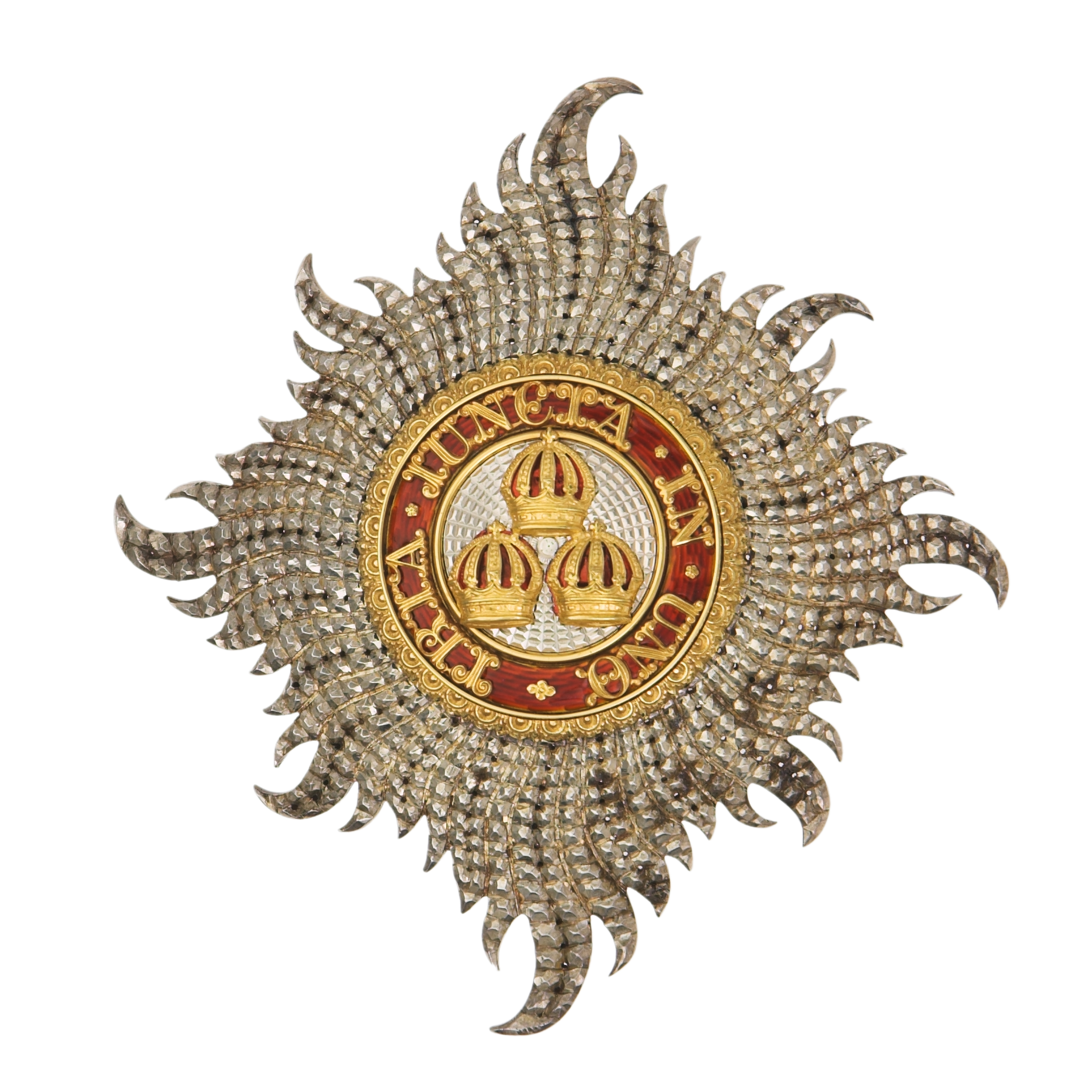
Civilian star of the Knight Grand Cross of the Order of the Bath

==== Knight Grand Cross of the Order of the Bath (KGCB) ====
Civil Division

- The Rt Hon. Sir William White GCMG CB Her Majesty's Ambassador Extraordinary and Minister Plenipotentiary at Constantinople.

==== Knight Commander of the Order of the Bath (KCB) ====
Civil Division

- Edward George Jenkinson CB
- Sir Julian Pauncefote GCMG CB Permanent Under Secretary of State, Foreign Office.

==== Companion of the Order of the Bath (CB) ====
Civil Division

- Capt. William de Wiveleslie Abney, Royal Engineers FRS Assistant Director, Science Division, Science and Art Department.
- James Monro, Assistant Commissioner of Metropolitan Police.
- Augustus W. Franks FRS FSA Keeper, Department of British and Mediaeval Antiquities and Ethnography.
- Marcus P. F. Caulfeild, of the Admiralty.

=== The Most Exalted Order of the Star of India ===
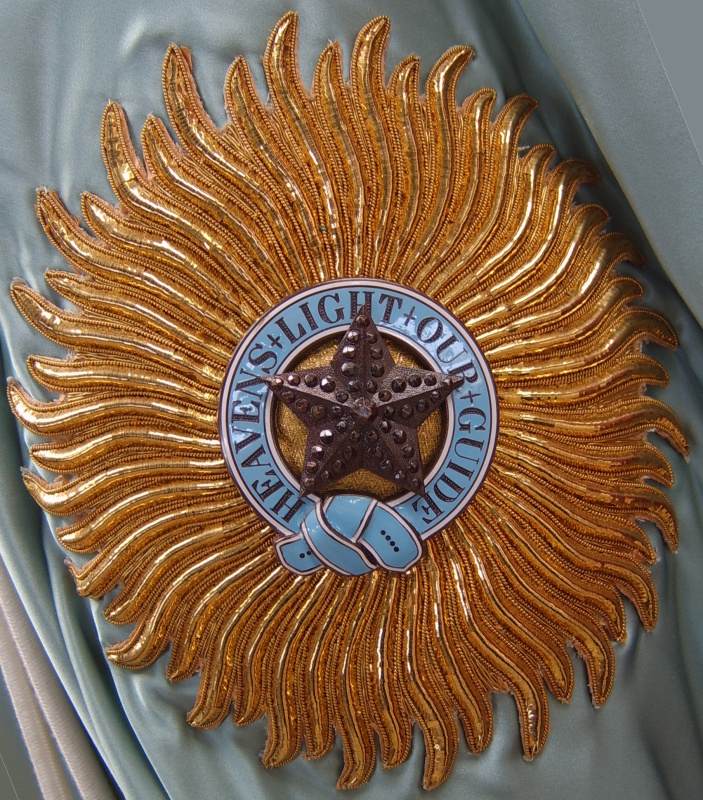
Star of a Knight Grand Commander of the Most Exalted Order of the Star of India.

==== Knight Grand Commander (GCSI) ====
- His Highness the Maharajah of Travancore.

==== Knight Commander (KCSI) ====
- James Broadwood Lyall, Bengal Civil Service, Lt.-Governor of the Punjab.
- Charles Hawkes Todd Crosthwaite CSI Bengal Civil Service, Chief Commissioner, Burmah.

==== Companion (CSI) ====
- James Westland, Bengal Civil Service Comptroller and Auditor-General, and Head Commissioner of Paper Currency.
- Antony Patrick MacDonnell, Secretary to Government of India, Home Department.

=== The Most Distinguished Order of Saint Michael and Saint George ===
Star of the Order of Saint Michael and Saint George.

==== Knight Commander of the Order of St Michael and St George (KCMG) ====
- James William Redhouse CMG
- Charles Alfred Cookson CB Her Majesty's Consul and Judge at Alexandria.
- His Excellency Zulfikar Pasha CMG
- His Excellency Osman Pasha Orphi CMG
- Alfred Dent, Chairman of the North Borneo Company.
- Frederick William Smythe, Controller-General of the Imperial Ottoman Bank, Constantinople.

==== Companion of the Order of St Michael and St George (CMG) ====
- Maj. C. E. Yate CSI for services on the Afghan Frontier Commission.
- Maj. W. Peacocke, Royal Engineers, for services on the Afghan Frontier Commission.
- George Dennis, late Her Majesty's Consul at Smyrna.
- Elwin Palmer, Ministry of Finance, Cairo.
- Col. J. H. Western, Public Works Department, Egypt.
- Col. Ross, Public Works Department, Egypt.
- Hadji Mohammad Hassan, British Agent at Kermanshah.

=== Order of the Indian Empire ===
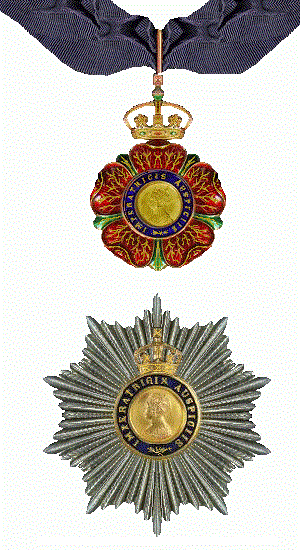
Riband, badge and star of the Knight Grand Commander of the Order of the Indian Empire

==== Knight Commander (KCIE) ====
- Raymond West, Bombay Civil Service, Member of the Council of the Governor of Bombay.
- Nawab Nawazish Ali Elan CIE
- Guilford Lindsey Molesworth CIE Consulting Engineer to Government of India for State Railways.
- Frederick Russell Hogg CSI Bengal Civil Service, Direator-General of the Post Office of India.
- Sirdar Nauroz Khan, of Kharan.
- Surgeon-General William James Moore CIE Surgeon-General with the Government of Bombay, and Honorary Surgeon to the Viceroy of India.
- Nawab Imam Buksh Khan CIE
- Sardar Attar Singh, of Bhadaur CIE
- Rajagopala Krishna Yachendra of Venkatagiri CSI

==== Companion (CIE) ====
- Edmund Foster Webster, Madras Civil Service.
- Alexander John Lawrence, Bengal Civil Service, Lt.-Col. Commandant Allahabad Volunteer Rifle Corps.
- Col. James Cavan Berkeley, Madras Staff Corps.
- Edward Charles Kayll Ollivant, Bombay Civil Service, Municipal Commissioner for the city of Bombay.
- Heera Sahib Lall Ramanuj Pershad Sing.
- Maj. William Sinclair Smith Bisset, Royal Engineers.
- Meirjibai Kuvarji, Dewan of Kolhapur.
- Charles Henry Tawney, Bengal Educational Department.
- Col. Thomas Weldon, Madras Staff Corps, Commissioner, Madras Town Police.
- Henry Irwin, Public Works Department.
- Capt. Buchanan Scott, Royal Engineers, Deputy Consulting Engineer, Public Works Department.
- Arthur Hedding Hildebrand, Burmah Commission, Superintendent of the Shan States.
- James Walker, Lt.-Col. Commandant, 2d Punjab or Simla Volunteer Rifle Corps.
- Ressaldar Maj. Muzaffar Khan, Sardar Bahadur, 4th Cavalry, Hyderabad Contingent.
