= Henry Irwin (Archdeacon of Elphin) =

Irish Anglican clergyman

Henry Irwin (died 1880) was an Irish Anglican clergyman.

Irwin was educated at Trinity College, Dublin; Later he held Incumbencies at Aughrim then Killukin. He was Archdeacon of Elphin from 1848 until his death.

His father, also called Henry Irwin, was Archdeacon of Emly; and his eldest son, another Henry Irwin, was a notable architect in British India.
