= Henry Irwin (Archdeacon of Emly) =

Henry Irwin (1773–1858) was Archdeacon of Emly from 1843 until 1858.

Irwin was born in Drogheda, County Louth, Ireland and educated at Trinity College, Dublin. He was the Minister at Sandford Chapel, Dublin before his appointment as Archdeacon.

His son was also an archdeacon; and his grandson was an architect of British India.
