= Arjuna (elephant) =

Asian elephant, participant in the Mysore Dysara

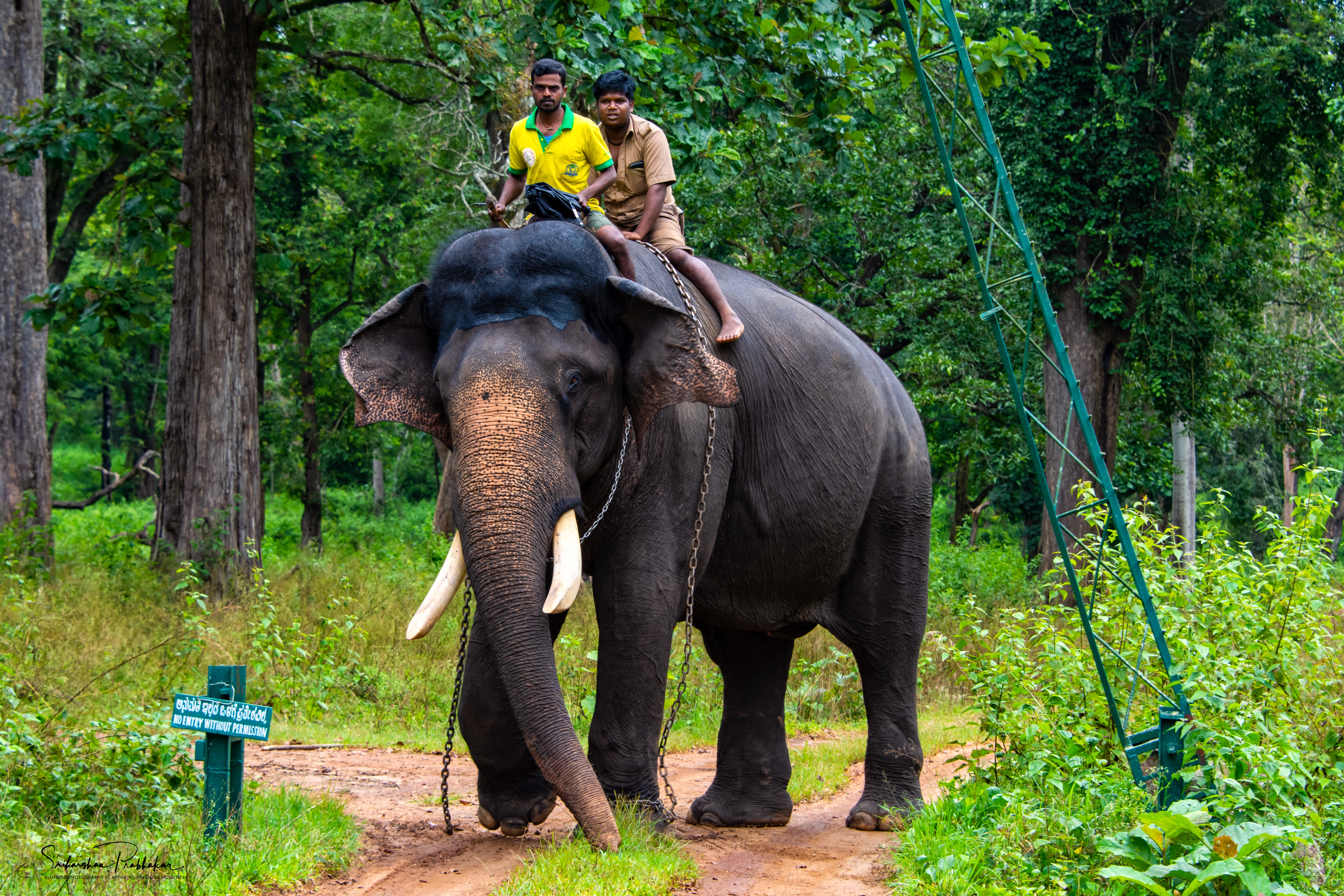
- Arjuna - The Mysore Dasara Golden Howdah Elephant
- Species: Asian elephant
- Sex: Male
- Born: c. 1959
- Died: 4 December 2023 (aged 64); Sakleshpur, Hassan, Karnataka, India
- Nationality: India
- Occupation: Golden Howdah carrier & Tiger and Wild elephant capturing Specialist
- Years active: 2012–2019
- Predecessor: Balarama
- Successor: Abhimanyu
- Weight: 6,040 kg
- Height: 2.95 m (9 ft 8 in)
- Named after: Arjuna

Arjuna (born c. 1959 – 4 December 2023) was an Asian elephant who, from 2012 to 2019, was the lead elephant and the carrier of the Golden Howdah at the Mysore Dasara. He was named after Arjuna, the third of the Pandava brothers from the Hindu epic Mahabharatha. Arjuna was part of a Karnataka Forest Department to tackle wild elephants across western Ghats of Karnataka and also operated in many states for capturing wild elephants. Arjuna died in combat on 4 December 2023.

== Mysore Dasara ==
Arjuna was captured in 1968 in the Khedda operations from the forests of Kakanakote in the Western Ghats of Karnataka. After he was tamed, he was made a regular at the camps that featured processions during the festival of Dasara in Mysore, in the 1990s. After Drona, then the carrier, fell ill prior to the Dasara festivities, Arjuna was made the carrier of the 750-kg Howdah that houses an idol of a Hindu deity Chamundeshwari, for a year, when the former was made the Nishane aane. That year, before the festivities began, he wavered and charged at the crowd, as the helicopter hovering above raining flower petals on the howdah came low. Eventually, he calmed down to complete the task. The following years, he was made the Nishan to follow Drona.

In 1996, when Arjuna and Bahadur, another Dasara elephant, were taken to Karanji Lake for bathing, Bahadur's mahout Annaiah fell and was trampled upon. It was reported as an accident, but Arjun was blamed upon, for already having been known for his bad temper. He was immediately taken "off-duty" and was confined to the village Balle, at the Nagarhole National Park, before being brought back to the Dasara camp and made the Nishane aane in 2001 to Balarama, which he remained till 2011. On course of selection of the carrier for festivities in 2012, Arjuna became the leading contender after he beat Balarama in the rehearsals of carrying the howdah, for five kilometers between Mysore Palace and Bannimantap, by 45 minutes, despite going through periods of musth at the time. His choice as the carrier was confirmed by the organizers in October 2012.

Arjuna carried the Golden Howdah from 2012 to 2019. He was succeeded by Abhimanyu. Arjuna died on 4 December 2023 from injuries sustained during a capture operation in a fight with a wild male elephant which was reportedly in musth.

== See also ==
- List of individual elephants
