= Balarama (elephant) =

Asian elephant (c. 1958–2023)

- Species: Elephas maximus (Asian Elephant)
- Sex: Male
- Born: c. 1956
- Died: 7 May 2023 (aged 67); Bheemanakatte Elephant camp
- Nationality: India
- Occupation: Golden Howdah carrier
- Years active: 1999–2011
- Known for: Mysore Dasara
- Predecessor: Drona
- Successor: Arjuna
- Owner: Mahout Thimma
- Weight: 4535 Kilograms
- Height: 2.7 m (8 ft 10 in)
- Named after: Balarama

Balarama (c. 1956 – 7 May 2023) was the lead elephant of the Mysore Dasara procession and carried the idol of goddess Chamundeshwari on the fabled Golden Howdah thirteen times between 1999 and 2011. Balarama was a bull born about 1958 and was accompanied in the procession by other Dasara Elephants. Of the many (about 16) elephants participating, Balarama was one of the star attractions when he carried on his back the sacred idol of goddess Chamundeshwari in the 750 kilograms (1,650 lb) golden howdah on the auspicious 10th day of Dasara celebrations.

== History ==
Balarama was captured in 1987 in the Kattepura forest near Somwarpet, in the Kodagu region of Karnataka. Balarama has taken part in the Dasara procession since 1994, carrying the golden howdah. A very silent bull (against the norm for elephants), he was said to be an introvert, and had to have special training so he could withstand the firing of cannons that occurs during the festival.

He succeeded Drona as the carrier of the Golden Howdah.

Balarama was not the first choice to carry the Howdah after Drona. Elephant Arjuna, a 44-year-old bull weighing 5,600 kilograms (12,300 lb) was supposed to be the carrier of the howdah, but was sidelined for accidentally killing a Mahout. One day, Arjuna went to bathe in a river with elephant Bahadur and Bahadur's trainer Annayya. While crossing a road, the elephants were startled by a vehicle and in the chaos that ensued, the rider Annayya fell down to the ground, only to be stamped on the head by Arjuna. He was crushed to death. People opined that an elephant that had killed a man was unfit to carry the religious duties of Dasara. So Arjuna, while being as capable as Drona, was not given the honorable duty, though he did have the honour of carrying the Chinnada Ambari once before being replaced by Balarama. Balarama had been rested from the duty of carrying the Golden Howdah due to his reducing weight and has been succeeded by Arjuna. Balarama led the procession as the 'nishane aane' or the lead elephant.

Balarama's Mahout Sannappa once refused to mount Balarama after his family were stopped by the police from watching him ride during Dasara.

Balarama refused food given to him by anybody other than his Mahout. Balarama weighed about 4590 Kilograms and he conquered the hearts of human beings by his majestic looks and the silence that he possessed. He was looked after at the Morkal Elephant camp at Nagarahole national park and his previous mahout Sannappa has retired and his new master Thimma has taken over.

The 67-year-old elephant was critically ill and under the care of a veterinarians at the Bhimanakatte elephant camp in the Hunsur range of the Nagarhole park. Despite the efforts of the medical team, Balarama's condition deteriorated. According to reports, Balarama had been recovering from an ulcer in his mouth but the veterinarian treating him suspected that he may have been suffering from tuberculosis. He died on 7 May 2023.

== See also ==
- List of individual elephants
