= Drona (disambiguation) =

Drona or Dronacharya is a character in the ancient Indian epic Mahābhārata.

Drona may also refer to:

- Drona (Simulator), small-arms range training simulator
- Drona (2008 film), a 2008 Indian Hindi film
- Drona (2009 film), a 2009 Indian Telugu film
- Drona (2020 film), a 2020 Indian Kannada film
- Drona 2010, a 2010 Indian film starring Mamooty
- Drona Parva, book of the Mahabharata
- Drona Prasad Acharya, Nepalese politician elected in 1991
- Drona (elephant), elephant named after Drona

== See also ==
- Dronachalam or Dhone, a town in Andhra Pradesh, India
- Dronamraju (disambiguation)
