= Dasara elephants =

In the Mysore Dasara Festival

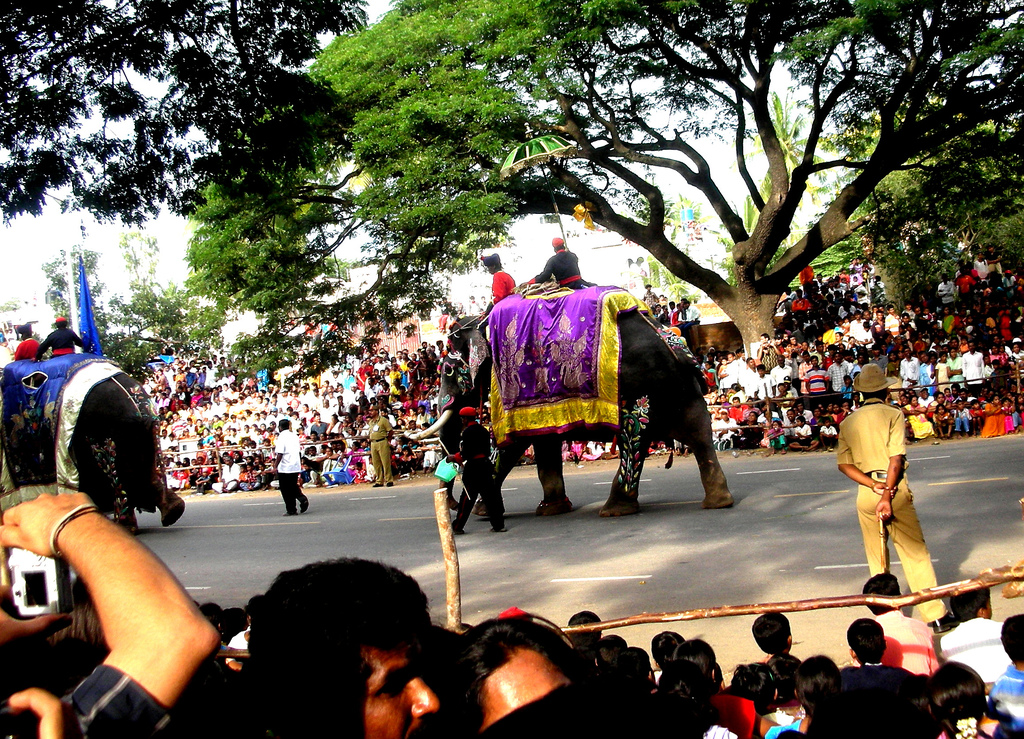
Mysore Dasara procession

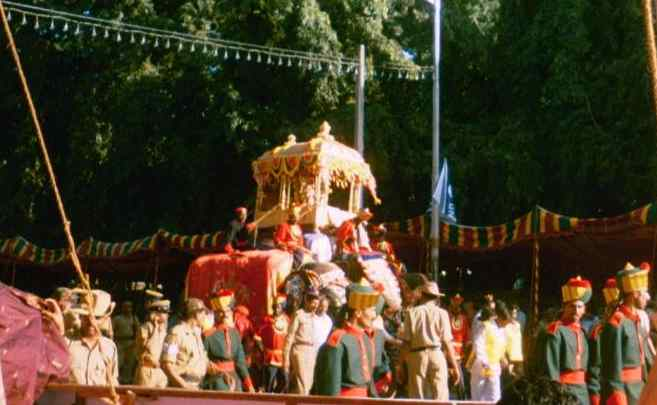
Golden Howdah atop the leading elephant during Dasara

Elephants are an integral part of the Mysore Dasara Festival. The elephants form the core of the Mysore Dasara procession on the Vijayadashami day. The lead elephant carries the Golden Howdah (Chinnada Ambari) with the Goddess Chamundeshwari in it. The Golden Howdah weighs 750 kilograms and is made of gold.

== Arrival ==
The Elephants start arriving to Mysore city in groups. They arrive to Mysore a month or so before the start of the actual festivities and they undergo practice for their march on the final day. The elephants are accompanied by their respective keepers or Mahouts. The elephants are usually brought in trucks and are occasionally walked the 70-km distance from their home base in the Nagarahole National Park to Mysore. Villagers greet the sacred animals all along their designated trekking route. As each party of pachyderms arrives at the Veerana Hosahalli forest checkpost in Hunsur taluk, from the forest, they are received by the District Minister, a host of officials and prominent persons from Mysore and people from nearby villages. The villagers perform folk dances, and beat drums and sing songs to welcome the elephants. This in keeping with the royal tradition of the Mysore Maharajas.

== Royal feast ==
In their respective camps, the elephants are served Ragi mudde, a mixture of ragi, horse gram, and fodder branches. When they are under special care inside Mysore Palace in preparation for Jamboo Savari, the grand Dasara finale, they are served high-calorie and protein-rich food to ensure that they are able to walk a distance of 4 km from Mysore Palace to the Bannimantap Parade Grounds. The elephants have a diet regime consisting of three components. The first component is branch fodder, consisting of edible green leaves, banyan tree leaves, sugarcane, and grass. The second component is Kusure, consisting of a baked mixture of jaggery, coconut, straw, and paddy. The third component consists of a mix, which is rolled into eight to ten balls and fed to the elephants. It consists of urad grain (black gram), green gram, wheat, parboiled rice, pure butter for flavour and a mixture of beetroot, carrot, radish and cucumber with cooked onions. This food is served twice a day; once in the morning at 5:30 AM, and once in the evening at 5:00 PM.

== Choosing the elephants ==
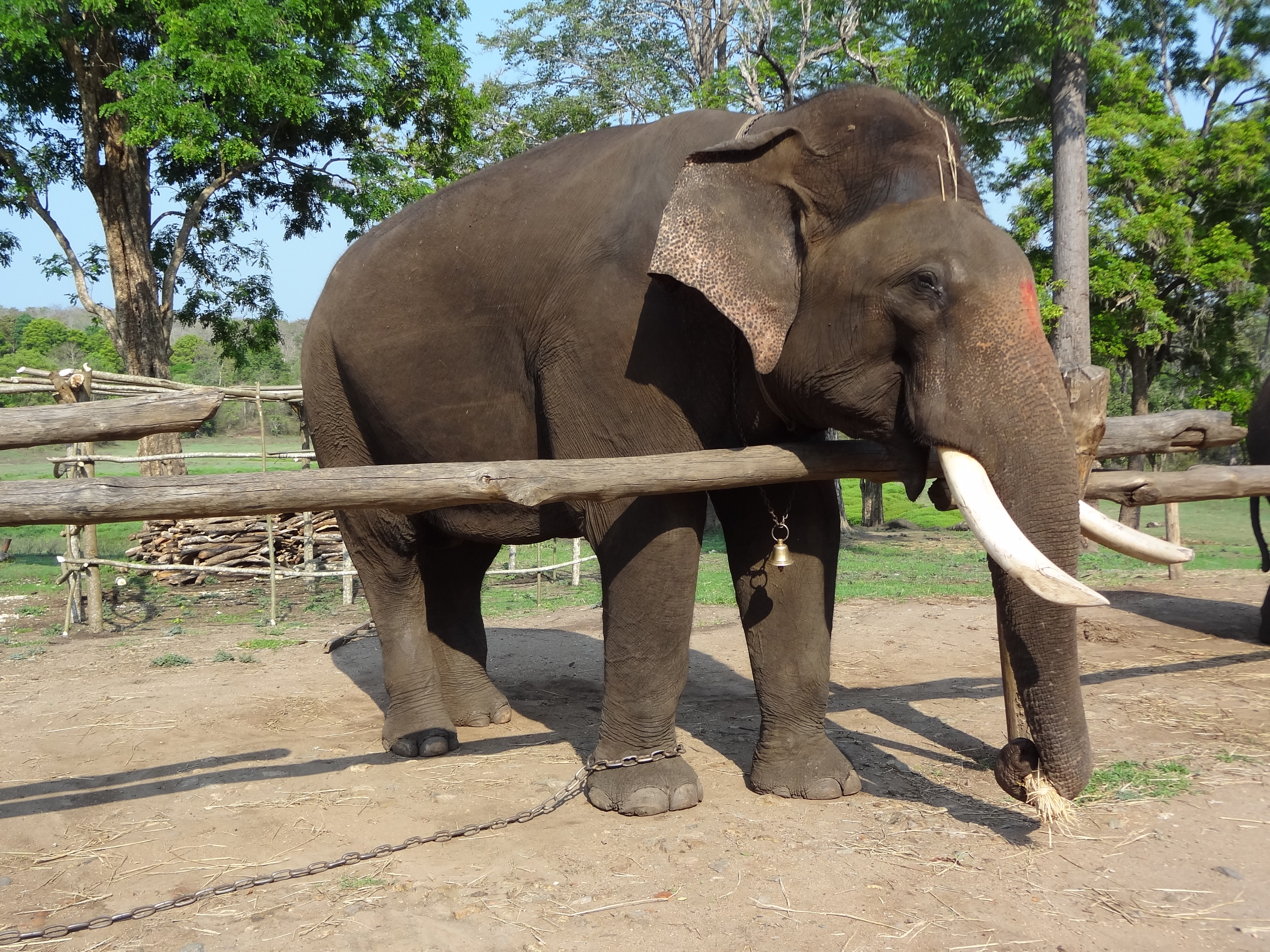
An elephant chosen to lead the Dasara parade

The Dasara Elephants are usually caught by the elephant trainers via the Khedda operation. During the Wodeyar rule, the elephants thus caught were inspected in an open field for strength, personality, and character. The walking styles, weaknesses to seduction, the facial charisma were some of the factors considered for selection. Then the chosen elephants were trained for the festival. It is said that the king himself would oversee the training. Sometimes abandoned young elephants are also trained for dasara. The abode of the elephants during the rest of the year is usually their training camps and the surrounding National Parks. There are around 70 elephants in camps at Dubare and elsewhere. About 240 mahouts and kavadis care for the elephants.

Video of 2019 Dasara elephants

The elephants are named in Kannada and usually have the names of Hindu gods and historical figures. Elephants Drona and Balarama carried the idol of deity Chamundeshwari housed in the Golden Howdah for a combined total of 30 years. Balarama took up the responsibility after Drona was electrocuted in 1998 at Nagarahole National Park. Balarama has been granted retirement after 13 years. The 52-year-old Arjuna replaced Balarama and carried the Golden Howdah during the Dasara 2012 Jamboo Sawari procession at Mysore on 24 October 2012. later Abhimanyu replaced Arjuna, who died on 4 December 2023 during a fight with wild tusker.

== Controversy ==
The Dasara procession has faced increasing pressure from activists and campaigners to end its controversial use of elephants. Dasara elephants and their mahouts have died in several incidents over the years.
