= Abhimanyu (disambiguation) =

Abhimanyu is a tragic hero in the ancient Indian epic Mahabharata.

Abhimanyu may also refer to:

== People ==
- Abhimanyu Dassani (born 1990), Indian actor
- Abhimanyu M. (1997–2018), Indian student activist
- Abhimanyu Mishra (born 2009), American chess grandmaster
- Abhimanyu Mithun (born 1989), Indian international cricketer
- Abhimanyu Puranik (born 2000), Indian chess grandmaster
- Abhimanyu Rajp (born 1986), Indian born American cricketer
- Abhimanyu Sindhu (born 1967), Indian politician of the Bhartiya Janata Party (BJP)
- Abhimanyu Singh (born 1974), Indian actor
- Syahrian Abimanyu, Indonesian footballer

== Films ==
- Abhimanyu (1936 film), Tamil film starring M. G. Ramachandran
- Abhimanyu (1948 film), Tamil film directed by A. Kasilingam
- Abhimanyu (1980 film), Hindi film directed by Mahesh Bhatt
- Abhimanyu (1983 film), Bengali film directed by Tapan Sinha
- Abhimanyu (1989 film), Hindi film directed by Tony Juneja
- Abhimanyu (1990 film), Kannada film directed by Raviraj
- Abhimanyu (1990 Bengali film), Bengali film directed by Biplab Chatterjee
- Abhimanyu (1991 film), Malayalam film directed by Priyadarshan
- Abhimanyu (1997 film), Tamil film directed by K. Subash
- Abhimanyu (2003 film), Telugu film directed by Mallikarjun
- Abhimanyu (2006 film), Bengali film directed by Swapan Saha
- Abhimanyu (2009 film), Odia film directed by Sushant Mani
- Abhimanyu (2014 film), Kannada film directed by Arjun Sarja
- Irumbu Thirai (2018 film), Tamil film released in Hindi as The Return of Abhimanyu

== Other uses ==
- Abhimanyu (elephant), in India
