= Howdah =

Carriage placed on the back of an elephant, camel, or other animal

- Howdah
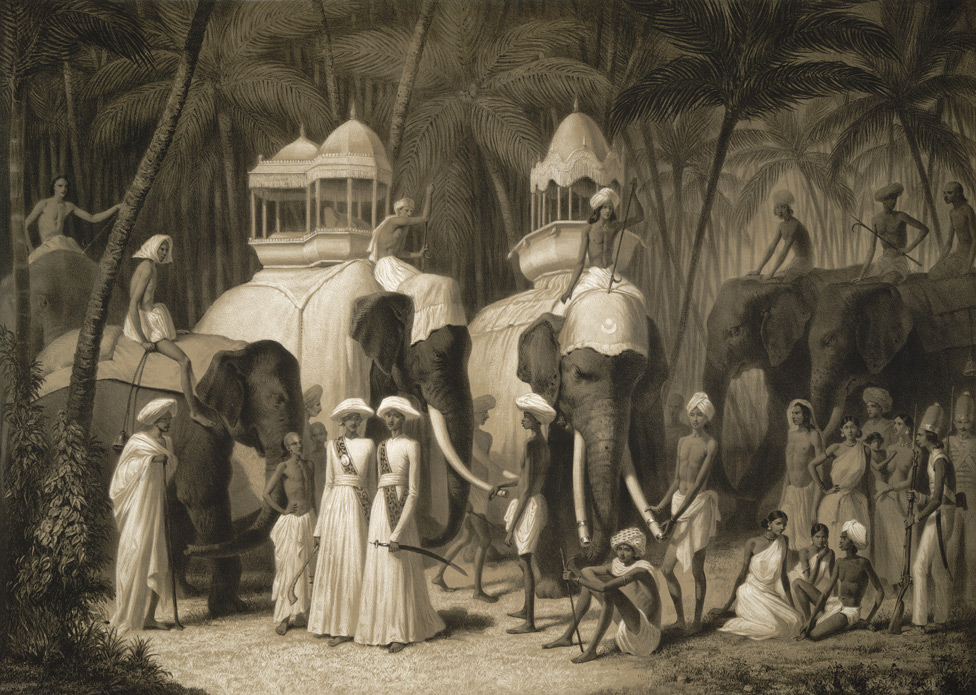
- Howdahs on the elephants of the Maharaja of Travancore (lithograph by Louis-Henri de Rudder, May 1841)
- Country: Delhi Sultanate; Deccan Sultanates; Mughal Empire
- Branch: Cavalry (ranged)

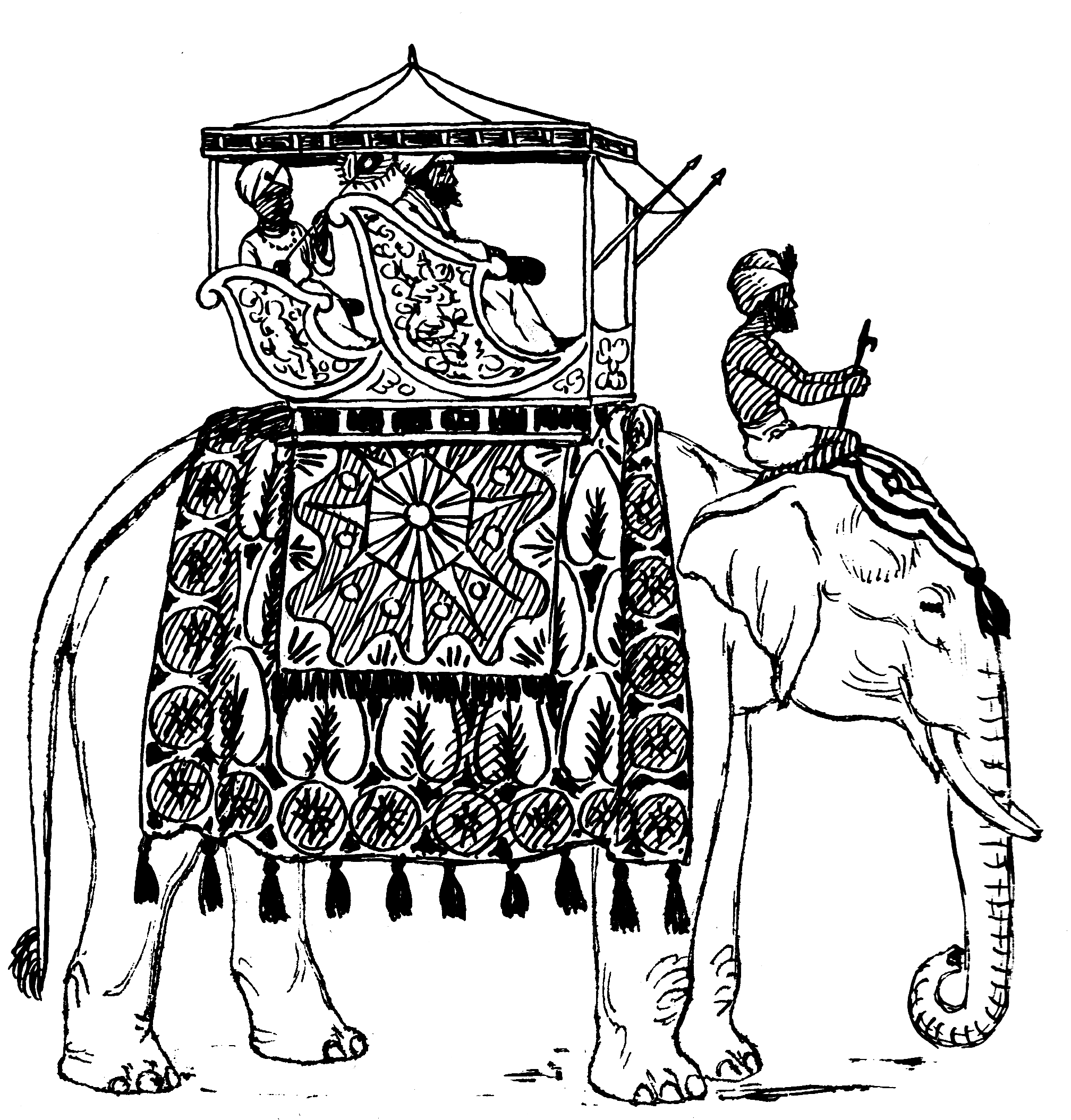
Elephant with howdah

A howdah or houdah (Hindi: हौदा, romanized: haudā, derived from the Arabic هودج hawdaj which means 'bed carried by a camel') also known as hathi howdah (हाथी हौदा hāthī haudā), is a carriage which is positioned on the back of an elephant, or occasionally some other animal, such as a camel, used most often in the past to carry wealthy people during progresses or processions, hunting or in warfare. It was also a symbol of wealth for the owner and as a result might be elaborately decorated, even with expensive gemstones.

Notable howdahs are the Golden Howdah, on display at the Napier Museum at Thiruvananthapuram, which was used by the Maharaja of Travancore and that is used traditionally during the Elephant Procession of the famous Mysore Dasara. The Mehrangarh Fort Museum in Jodhpur, Rajasthan, has a gallery of royal howdahs.

Today, howdahs are used mainly for tourist or commercial purposes in South East Asia and are the subject of controversy as animal rights groups and organizations, such as Millennium Elephant Foundation, openly criticize their use, citing evidence that howdahs can cause permanent damage to an elephant's spine, lungs, and other organs and can significantly shorten the animal's life.

== History ==
A passage from Roman historian Curtius describes the lifestyles of ancient Indian kings during the "Second urbanisation" (c. 600 – c. 200 BCE) who rode on chariots mounted on elephants or howdahs when going on distant expeditions.

== Howdah Gallery, Mehrangarh Fort Museum ==
The Mehrangarh Fort Museum, Jodhpur, has a gallery dedicated to an array of Hathi Howdah, used by the Maharaja of Mewar, mostly for ceremonial occasions.

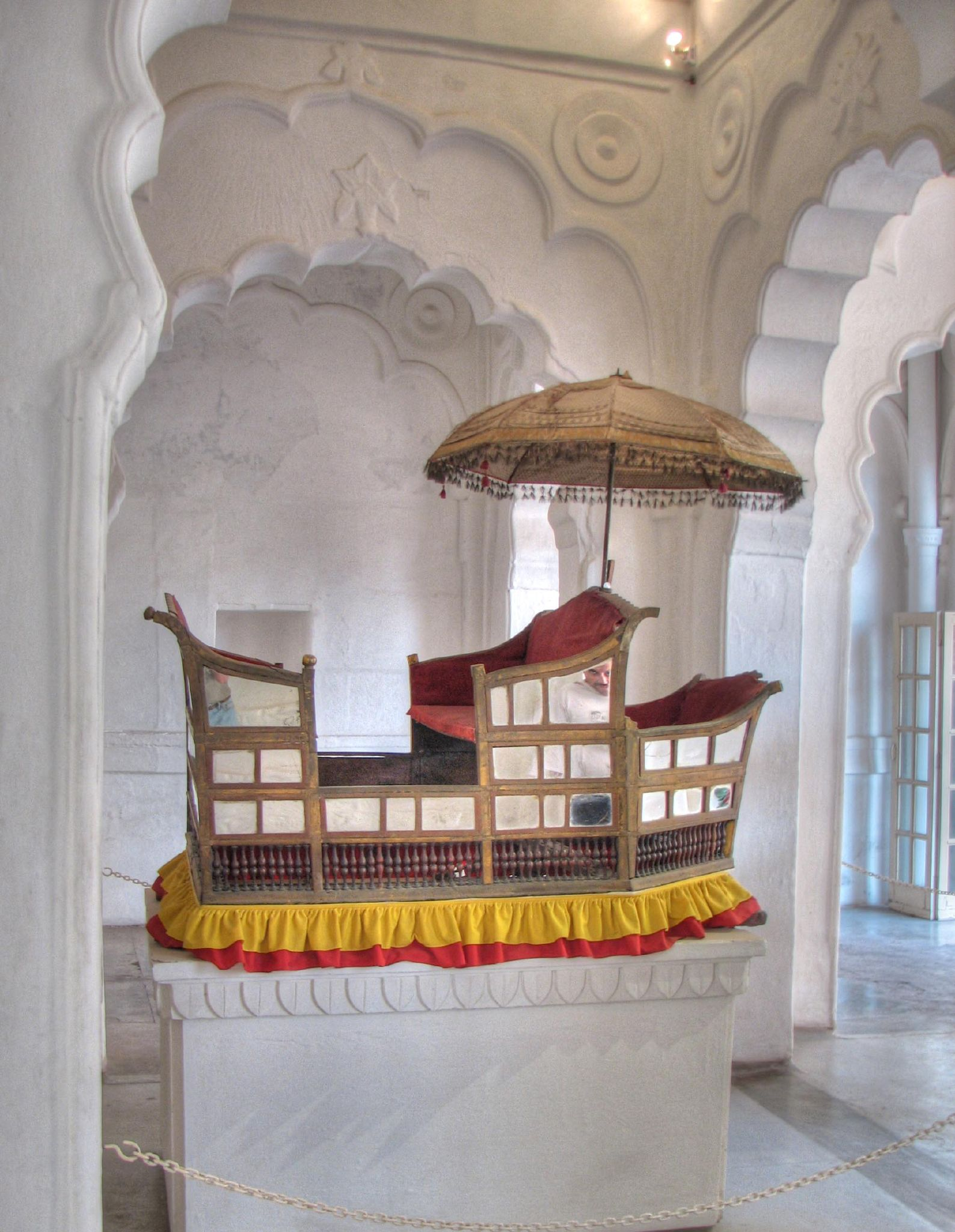
Hathi howdah, Mehrangarh Fort Museum.

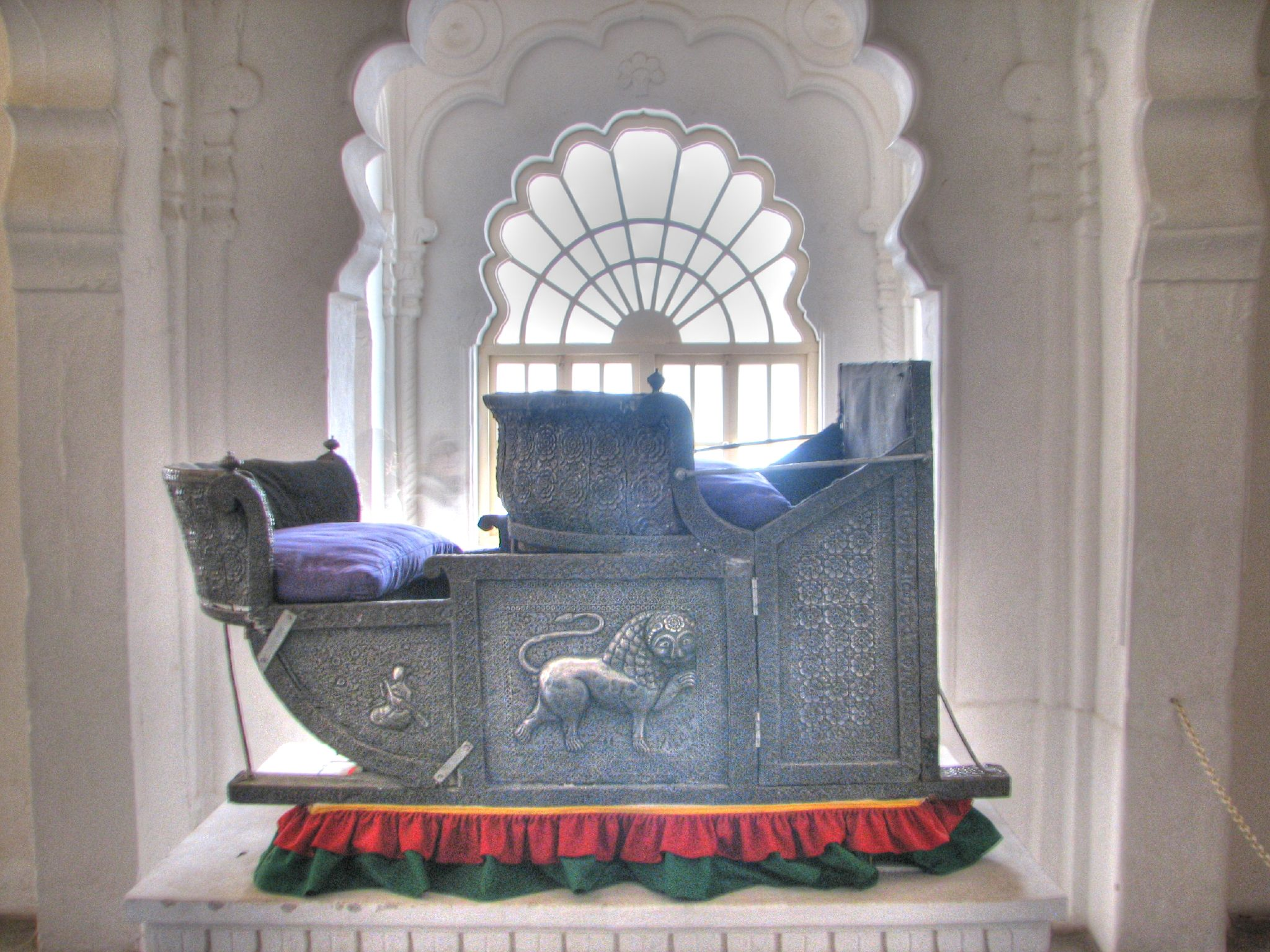
Silver hathi howdah, Mehrangarh Fort Museum.

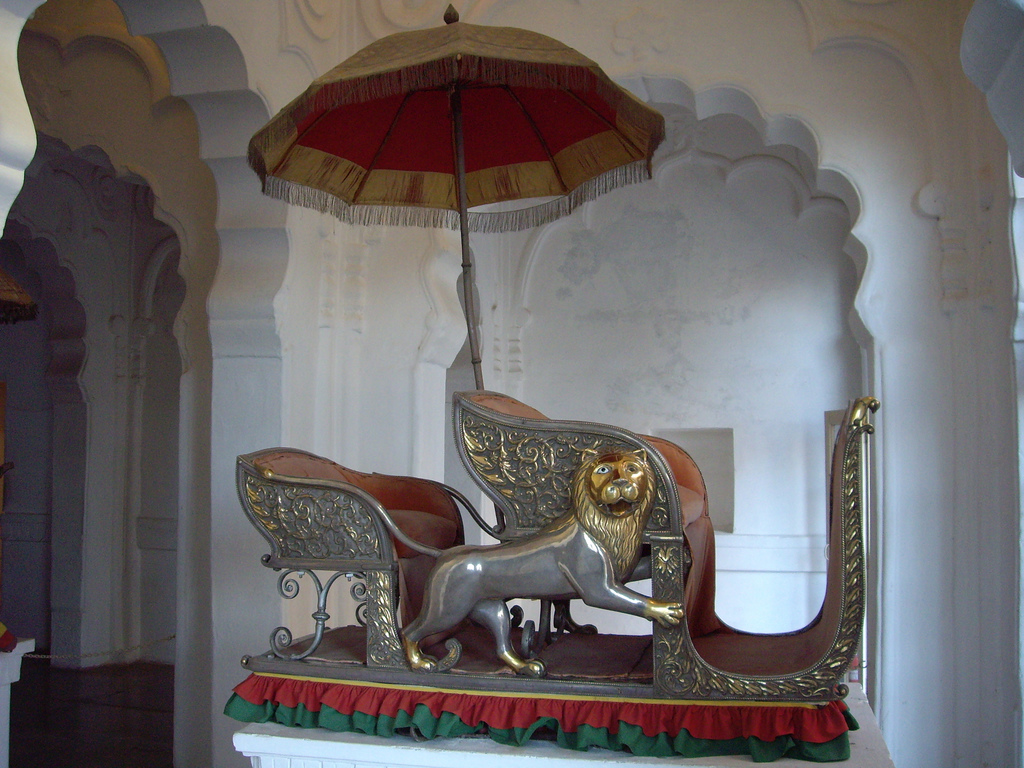
Hathi howdah or elephant seat in the Mehrangarh Fort Museum.

== Howdah for armies ==
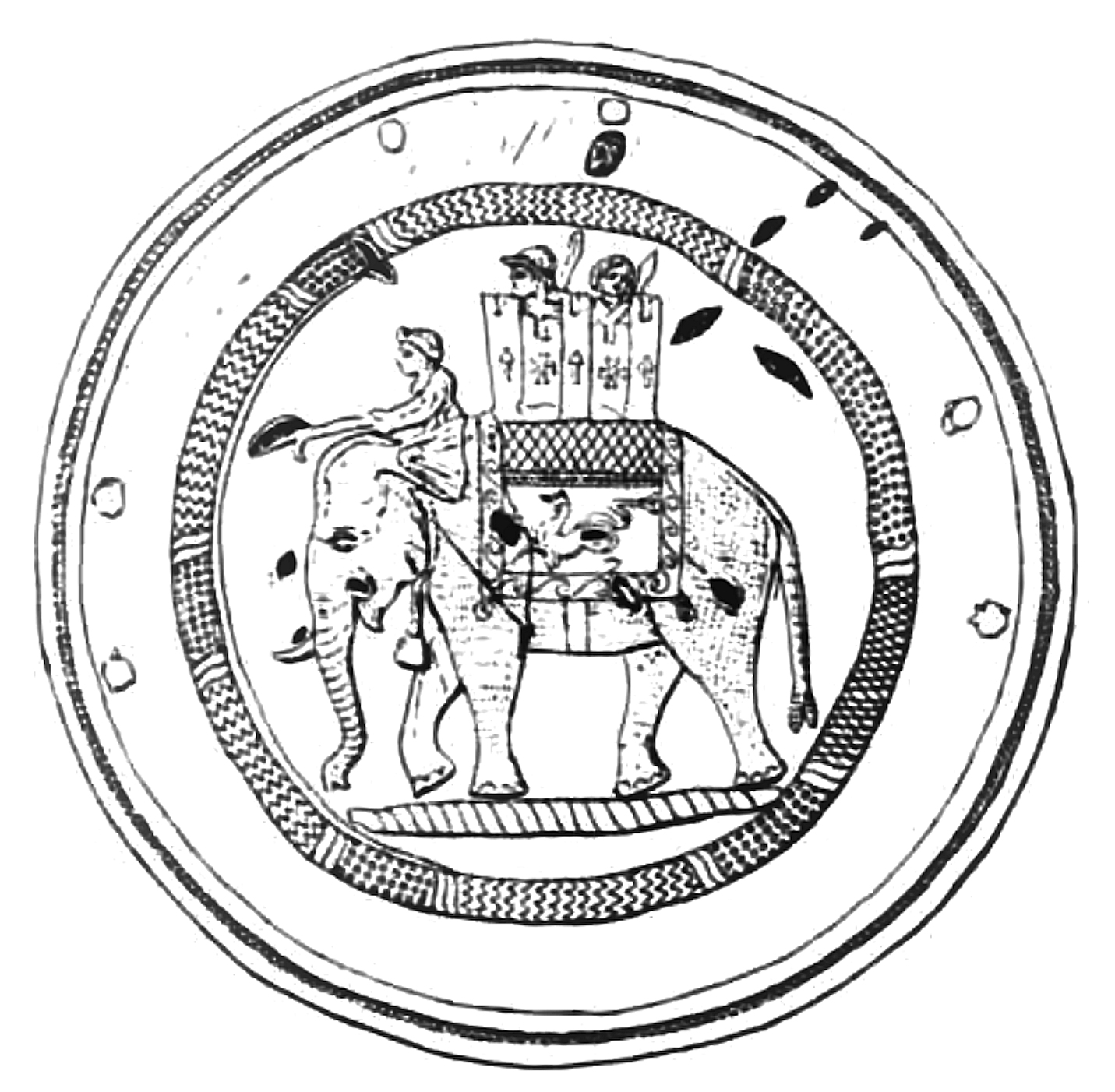
Bactrian phalera with military elephant carrying a howdah fortress manned by a soldier wearing a Macedonian helmet. 2nd century BCE, Hermitage Museum.

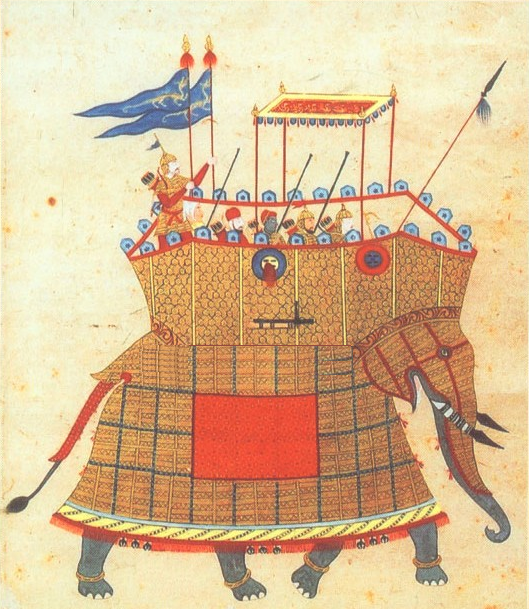
Howdah of the Qutb Shahi dynasty.

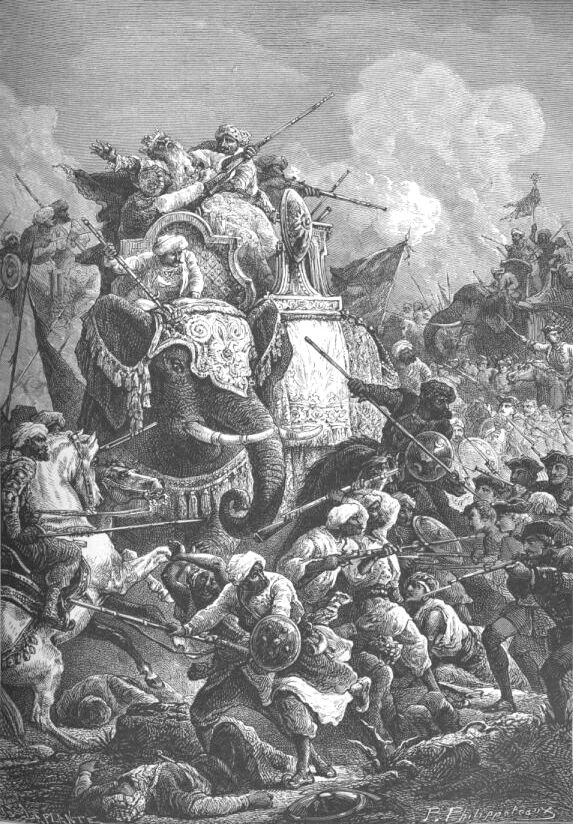
Howdah were used extensively during the Carnatic Wars.

Howdahs with battlements inspired "elephant and castle" imagery

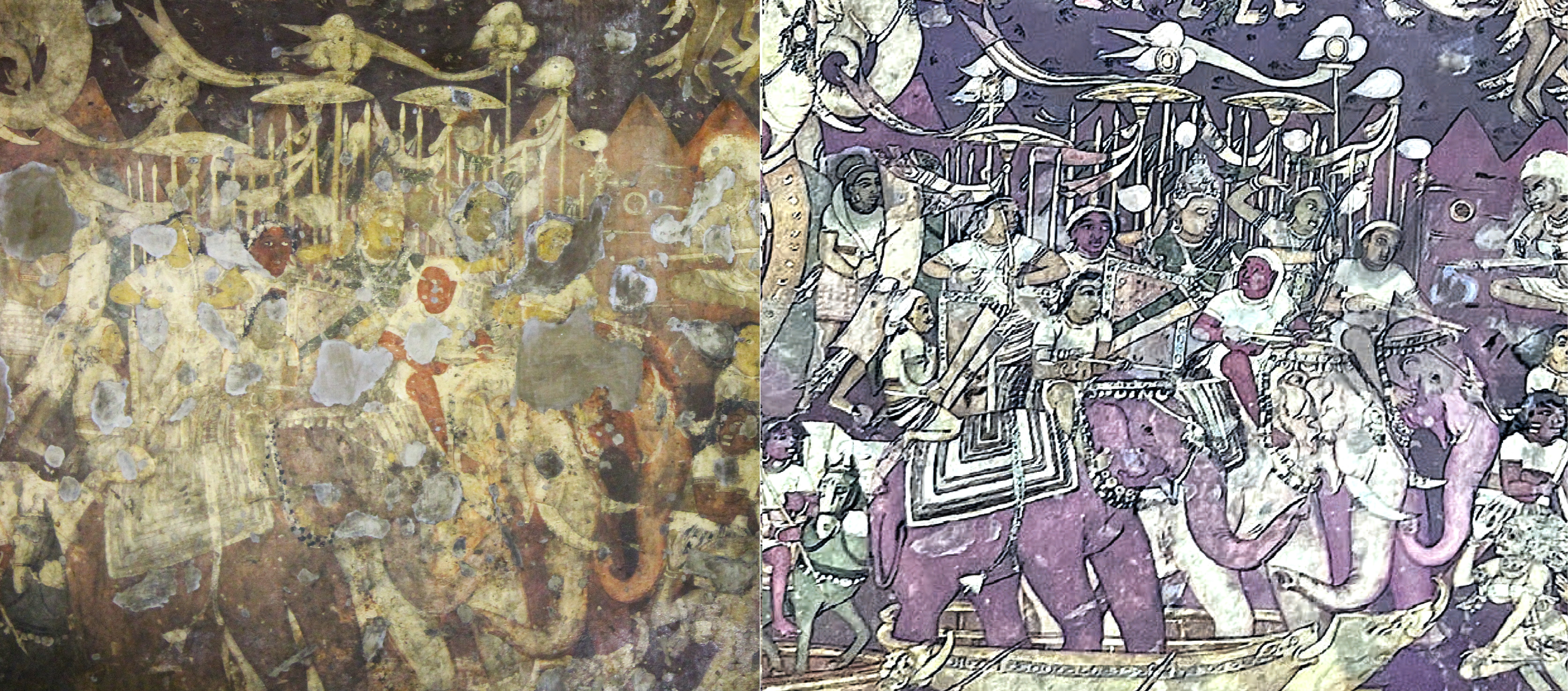
Howdah at Royal army procession depiction in the Cave no. 17, Ajanta, Aurangabad, Maharashtra.

== References in literature ==
The American author Herman Melville in Chapter 42 ("The Whiteness of the Whale") of Moby-Dick (1851), writes "To the native Indian of Peru, the continual site of the snow-howdahed Andes conveys naught of dread, except, perhaps, in the more fancy of the eternal frosted desolateness reigning at such vast altitudes, and the natural conceit of what a fearfulness it would be to lose oneself in such inhuman solitudes." It also appears in Chapter 11 of Jules Vernes' classic adventure novel Around the World in Eighty Days (1873), in which we are told "The Parsee, who was an accomplished elephant driver, covered his back with a sort of saddle-cloth, and attached to each of his flanks some curiously uncomfortable howdahs.” It is mentioned in the first chapter of Ben-Hur: “Exactly at noon the dromedary, of its own will, stopped, and uttered the cry or moan, peculiarly piteous, by which its kind always protest against an overload, and sometimes crave attention and rest. The master thereupon bestirred himself, waking, as it were, from sleep. He threw the curtains of the houdah up, looked at the sun, surveyed the country on every side long and carefully, as if to identify an appointed place.”

Tolkien wrote in The Lord of the Rings of the Mûmakil (Elephants) of Harad with howdahs on their backs.

== Elephant and castle symbol ==
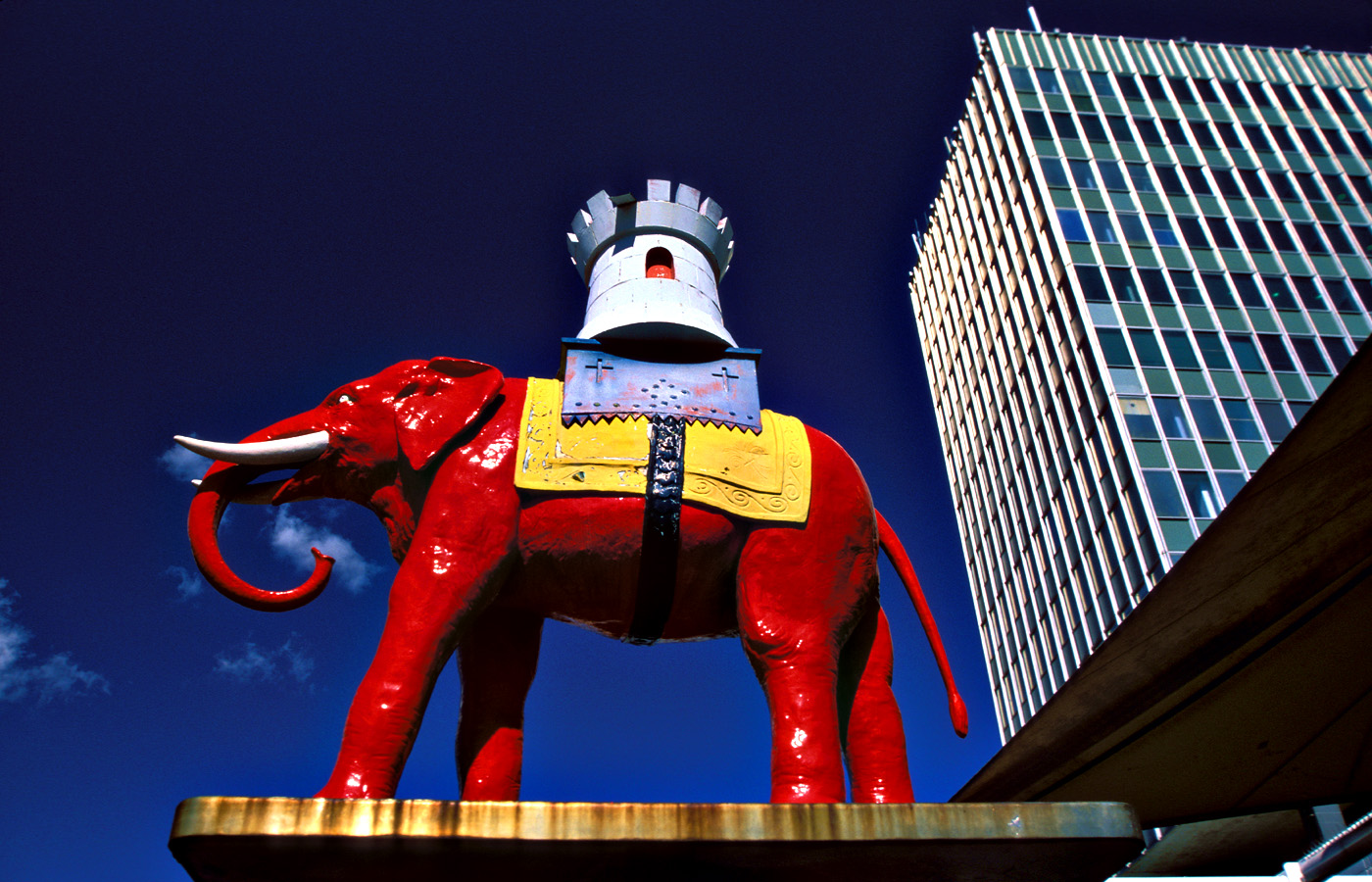
Statue at Elephant and Castle intersection in London.

A derived symbol used in Europe is the "elephant and castle": an elephant carrying a castle on its back, being used especially to symbolize strength. The symbol was used in Europe in classical antiquity and more recently has been used in England since the 13th century, and in Denmark since at least the 17th century.

In the 2nd century BCE elephants with towers or castles were used by Lysias (Syrian chancellor) at the Battle of Beth Zechariah where "upon the beasts were there strong towers of wood". In the 1st century BCE the Romans made use of war elephants, and turreted elephants feature on the coinage of Juba II of Numidia. Elephants were used in the Roman campaigns against the Celtiberians in Hispania, against the Gauls, and against the Britons, the ancient historian Polyaenus writing, "Caesar had one large elephant, which was equipped with armor and carried archers and slingers in its tower. When this unknown creature entered the river, the Britons and their horses fled and the Roman army crossed over." However, he may have confused this incident with the use of a similar war elephant in Claudius' final conquest of Britain.

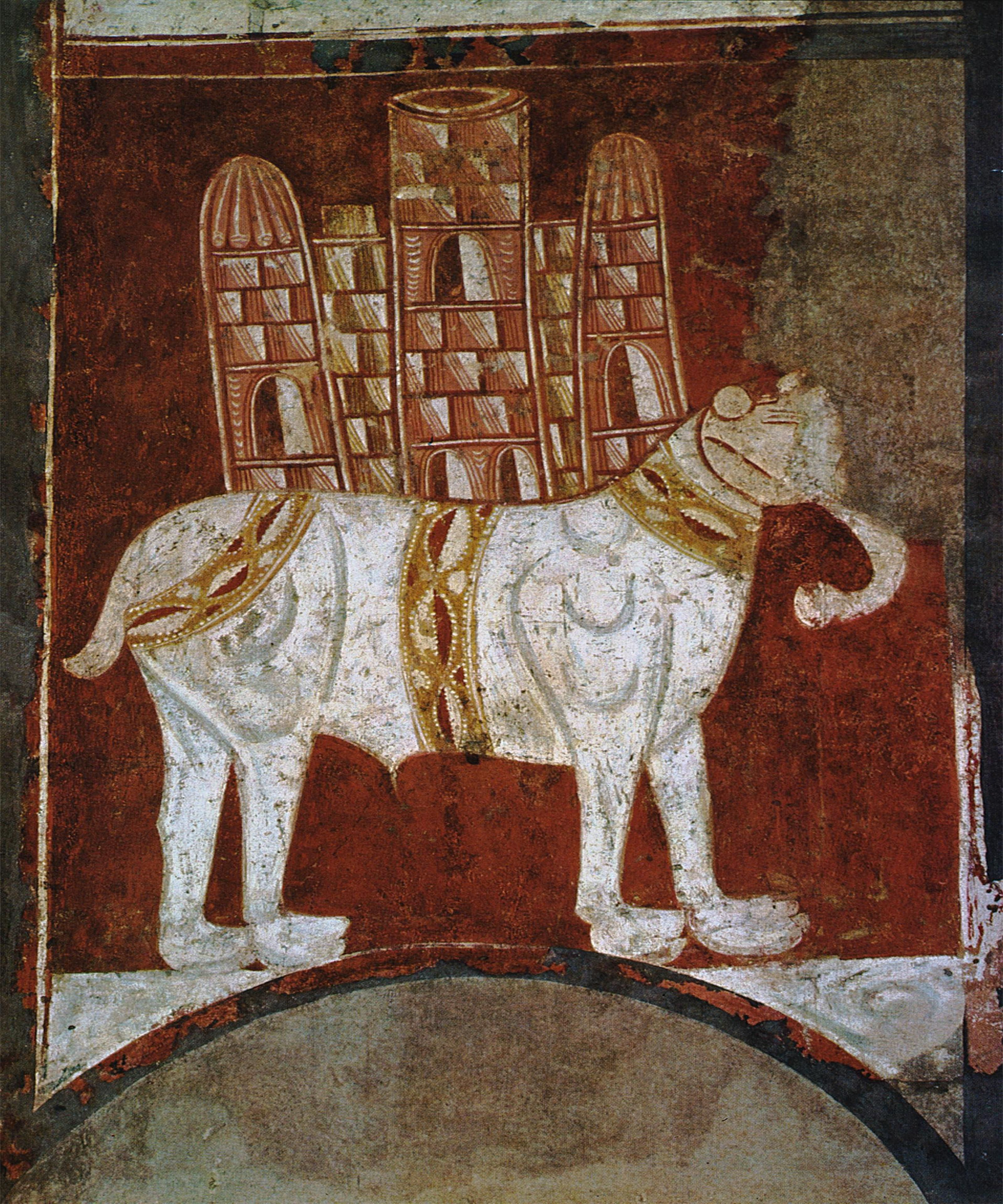
12th century Spanish painting of a war elephant.

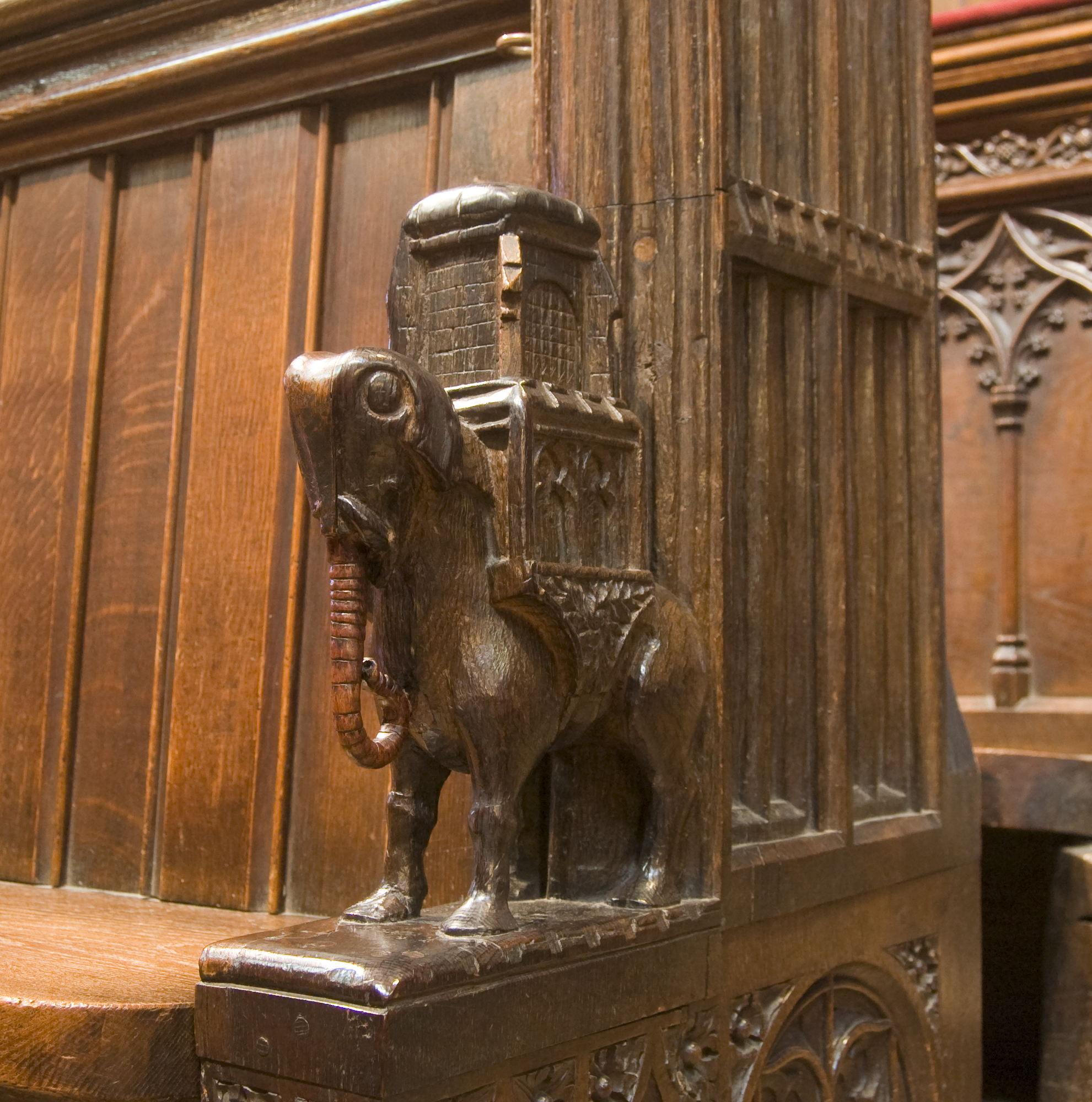
The "elephant and castle" from the 14th-century choir stalls in Chester Cathedral

Alternatively, modern uses may derive from later contacts with howdahs. Fanciful images of war elephants with elaborate castles on their back date to 12th century Spain, as at right.

Notably, 13th century English use may come from the elephant given by Louis IX of France to Henry III of England, for his menagerie in the Tower of London in 1254, this being the first elephant in England since Claudius.

Today the symbol is most known in the United Kingdom from the Elephant and Castle intersection in south London. This derives its name from a pub established by 1765, in a building previously known as The White Horse and used by a smith or farrier. It has been claimed the premises had been associated with the Cutlers' Company. However the company has advised a contributor it has never had an association with the area. Meanwhile the use of the symbol by the Cutlers due to the presence of ivory in sword and cutlery handles is just one of diverse world-wide uses of the term over a long period. These include the titles of several other public houses in London. Stephen Humphrey, a historian of the Elephant and Castle, addresses the various origin theories and demonstrates the naming of the pub that subsequently gave its name to the area was random.

The elephant and castle symbol has been used since the 13th century in the coat of arms of the city of Coventry, and forms the heraldic crest of the Corbet family, feudal barons of Caus, of Caus Castle in Shropshire, powerful marcher lords. It was used in the 17th century by the Royal African Company, which led to its use on the guinea gold coin.

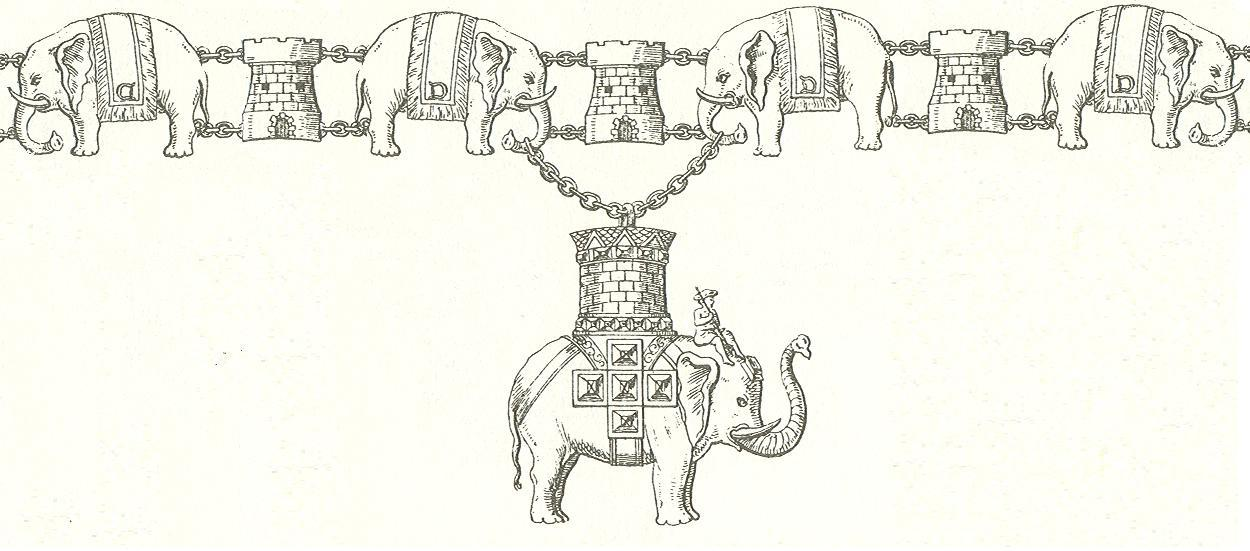
The collar of the Order of the Elephant.

The symbol of an elephant and castle has also been used in the Order of the Elephant, the highest order in Denmark, since 1693.

== Camel howdah ==
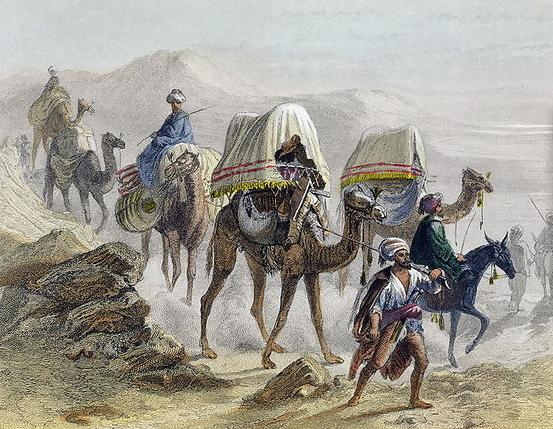
Camel train with howdah (1855).

- In Persia, a camel howdah used to be a common means of transport.

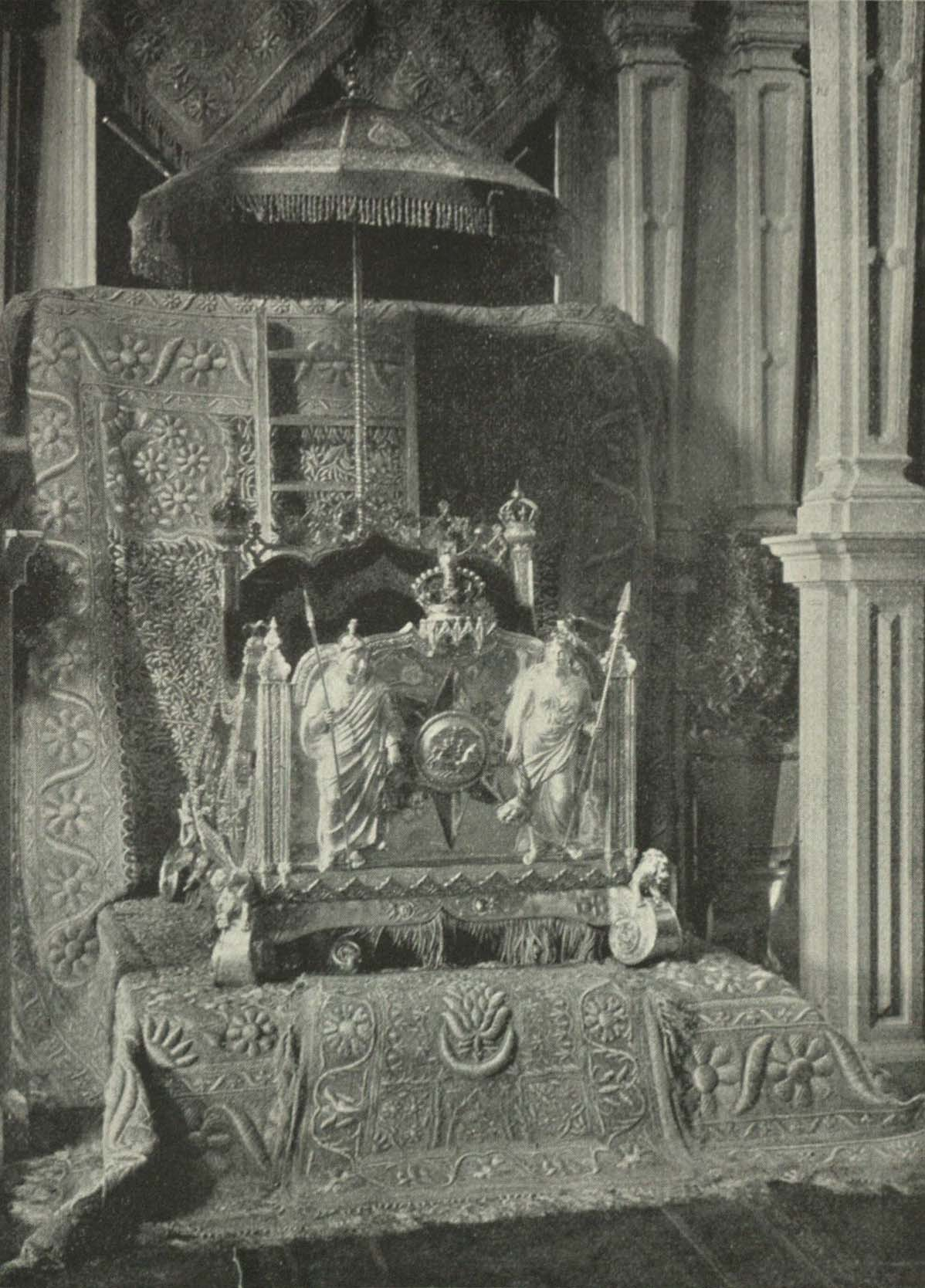
The Viceroy's Howdah at Viceregal Lodge, Simla, c. 1905

- Turkmens traditionally used Kejebe/کجوه on Camels, mainly used for carrying women in long distances or weddings, now it is only rented for weddings.

== See also ==
- Litter
- Mahout, the driver of an elephant
- Howdah pistols, large handguns used to defend howdahs from predators
- Persian war elephants
