= 2013 Mysore Dasara =

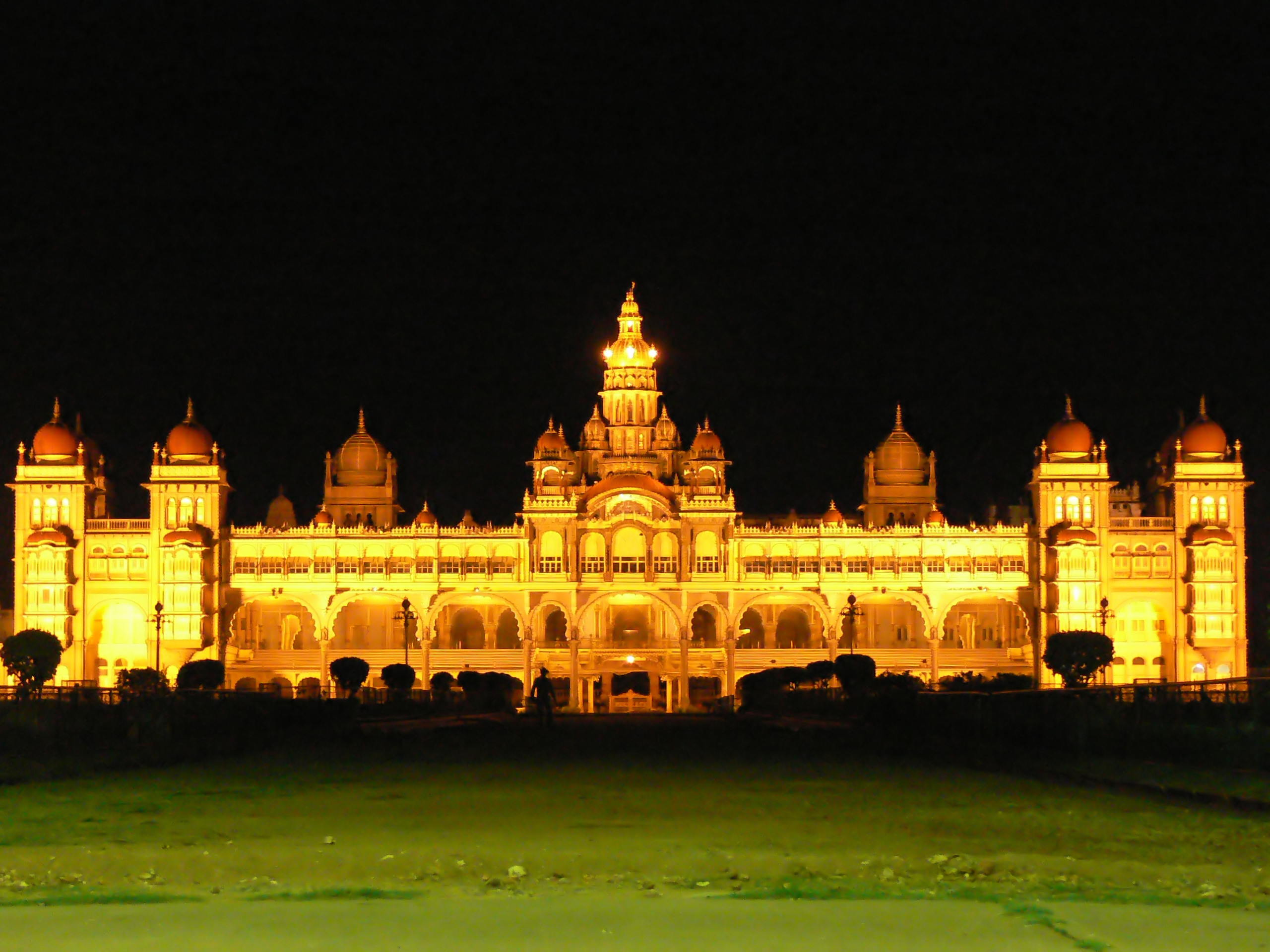
Mysore Palace illuminated with 96,000 bulbs during the Mysore Dasara Festival

The Mysore Dasara 2013 is the 403rd edition of the annual royal festive gala event, a show of pomp and tradition that is held in the Mysore city in Karnataka, India for 10 days. The festival is called the Navaratri (meaning nine nights or Dussehra or Vijayadashami which conforms to the bright half (Shukla Paksha) of the month of Ashvin (Ashwayuja), from pratipada (first day) thithi (day) to navami (ninth) thithi (first nine days of the month) in the Hindu calendar corresponding to 5 to 13 October during 2013. The festival is also called Nada Habba (festival of the country) in Kannada language. The first day of the nine-day festivity started on 5 October with the traditional and religious special puja (worship) performed to Goddess Chamundeshwari in the Chamundi Temple on top of the Chamundi Hill, which forms the backdrop to the city; the temple was beautifully decorated with flowers and tourist from Gujarat, Rajasthan and other states enthralled the audience with their bhajan singing (devotional songs). On this occasion, floral tribute wa offered to the goddess by Jnanpith Award winner Chandrashekhara Kambara and festivities will continue for ten days. The ninth day of the festival is a special event called the Mahanavami when the royal sword is worshipped and taken in a procession of elephants, camels and horses. The festival concludes on 14 October on the dashami day (tenth day from the start of the festival) with the grand finale of Jambusavari (a royal procession) with the idol of Chamundeshawri set in a golden howdah mounted on a richly caparisoned elephant. The procession is taken through the streets of the city and ends in the Banni Mantap where, in the evening, a torch light parade is held. Symbolically, the festival represents the victory of good over evil.

During the festival period the royal Mysore Palace, fitted with 96,000 bulbs is lit giving the palace a golden hue glittering brightness in the evenings which provides for a grand spectacle. Cultural programmes are part of the festivities.

== History ==
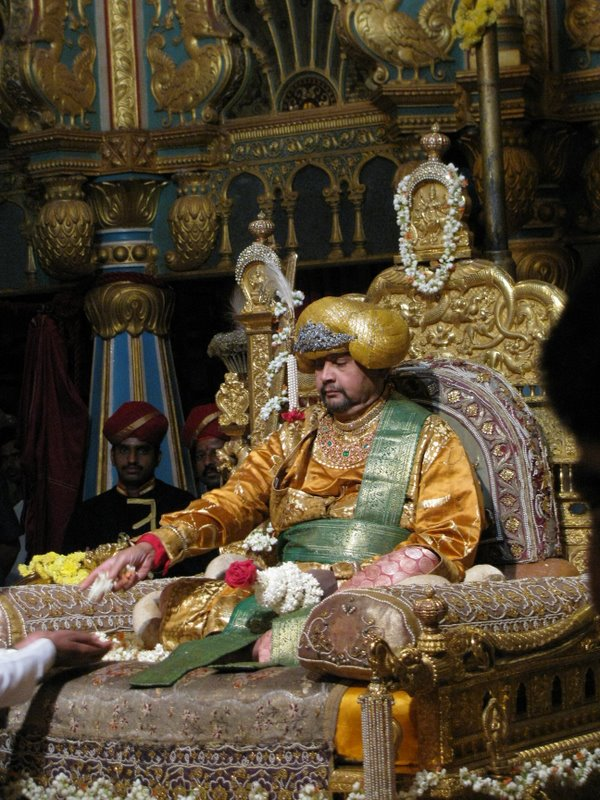
Srikanta Datta Narasimharaja Wadiyar, former Scion of Mysore Royal Family on the golden throne during the durbar.

The earliest recorded history of dasara celebration was during the reign of emperor Devaraya II of the Vijayanagar Empire during the 15th century which has also been attested by the Persian traveler, Abdul Razzak who witnessed this festival during 1442 - 43 AD. When the Wadiyar kings of Mysore who were initially subordinate to the Vijayanagara Empire, following the decline of the empire, declared themselves as rulers. Then, Raja Wadiyar (1578-1617 CE) founded the Kingdom of Mysore and the Wodeyar Dynasty in 1610. He continued the tradition of holding the dasara, first in Srirangapatna which was then their capital and then in Mysore city after they shifted their capital. In 1805, Krishnaraja Wodeyar III introduced the royal tradition of holding a durbar (Royal court) in the Mysore Palace when members of the royal family, courtiers, invited elites and common people of the city attended, and cultural programmes were performed. This tradition is continued even now, though as a private event called the "khasgi (private) durbar" by Srikantadatta Narasimharaja Wodeyar, the former scion of the Wodeyar family. On the durbar days, the present scion of the Wodeyar family occupied the golden thrown with all pomp and splendour when a march past of the royal elephants and horses is also held; open air musical concerts are a regular feature on the occasion.

== Jambo Savari ==
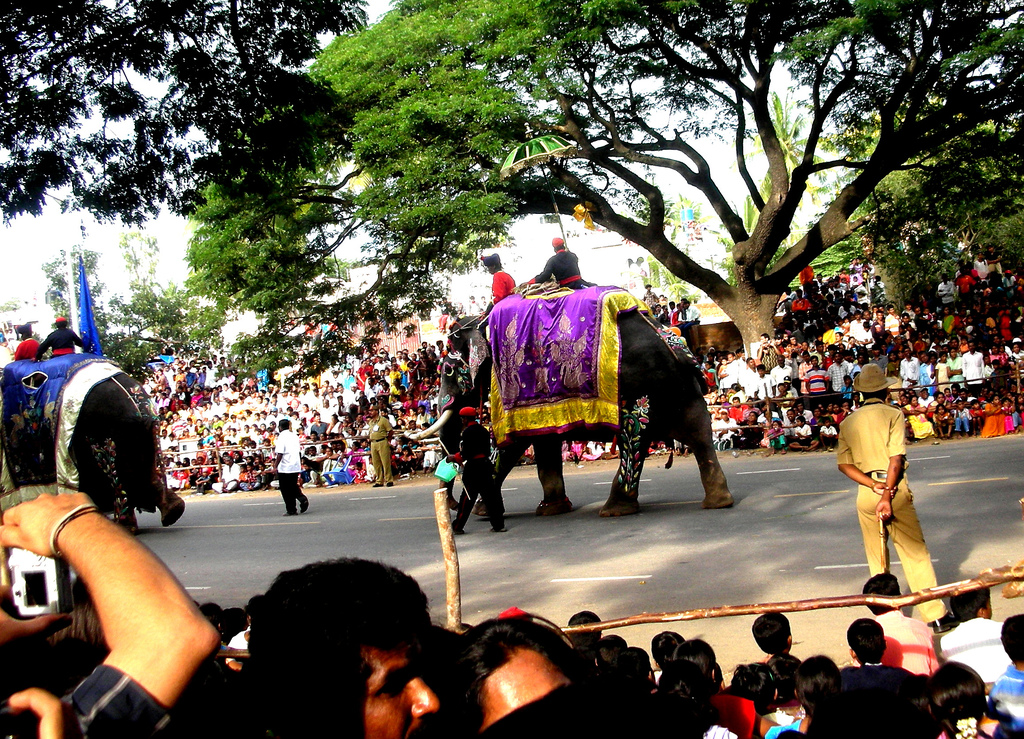
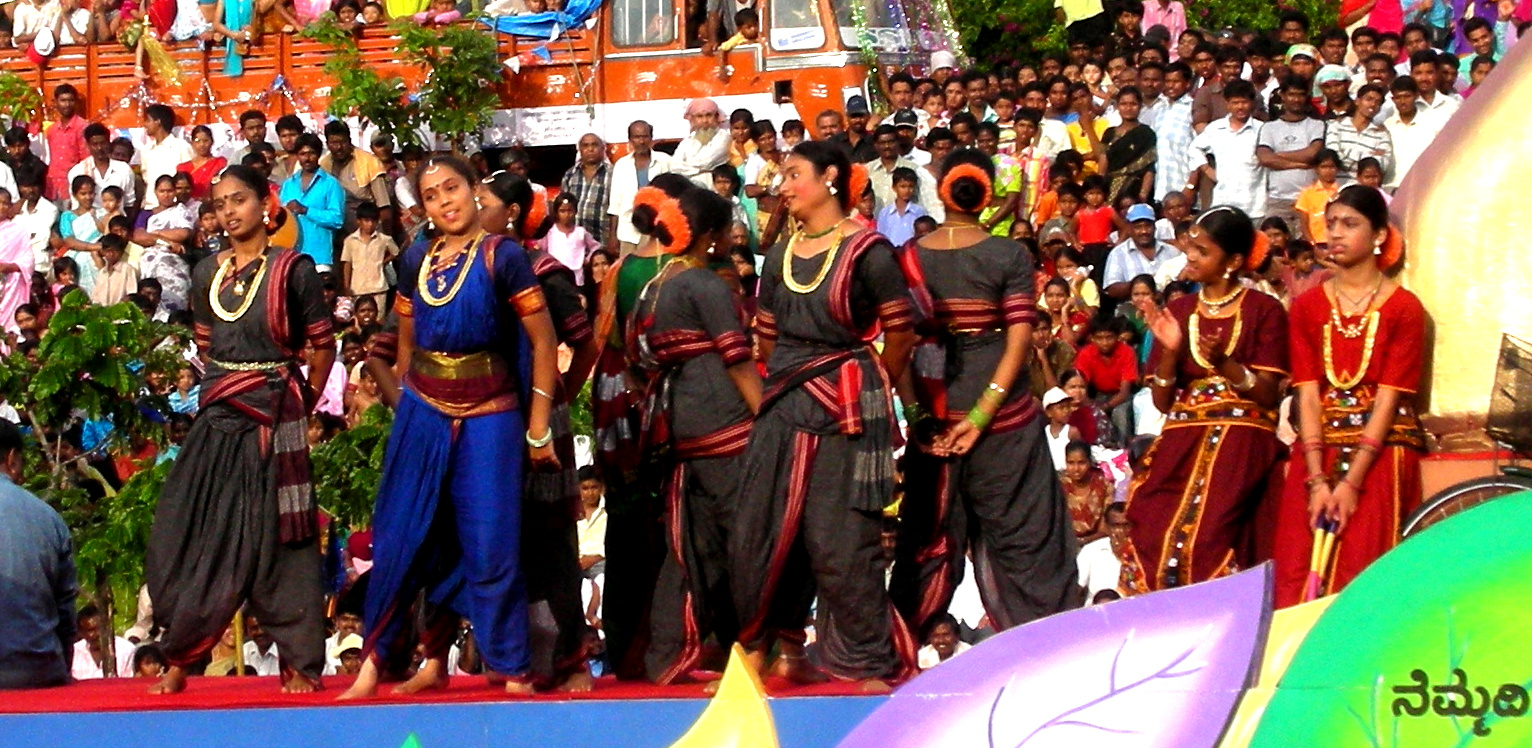
Left: Mysore Dasara procession. Right: Female dancers in trouser-type saris, on top of a truck during Dasara procession in Mysore

Jambo Savari is a royal procession of the Dusara that will take place on the Vijayadashami day (tenth day on 14 October). This procession, as in the past, will be taken through the streets of Mysore city. On this occasion, the main idol of the Goddess Chamundeshwari, placed over a golden howdah on the top of a richly decorated elephant is worshipped at the palace grounds by the royal couple and other assembled dignitaries. The procession starts from the palace with colourful floats, dance troupes, music bands, armed forces, folklores, the royal dignitaries, decorated elephants, horses leading the procession. The procession terminates at the Bannimantap, a traditional practice linked to Mahabharata epic. Banni is a tree (Prosopis spicigera) which is worshipped at the mantap or hall. The legend narrated for this event is that during the Mahabharata, Banni tree was the place where the Pandavas the heroes of Mahabharata War had hidden their arms during their one-year vow of remaining incognito Agnatavasa. They retrieved their arms after the one-year period and in the subsequent war they won against Kauravas. Since then symbolically, the kings, before embarking on any warfare, traditionally worshipped this tree to come out successful in the war. After the conclusion of the parade, in the evening, at the same venue, Panjina Kavayithu a locally named event meaning "torch-light parade" is held.

== Cultural events ==
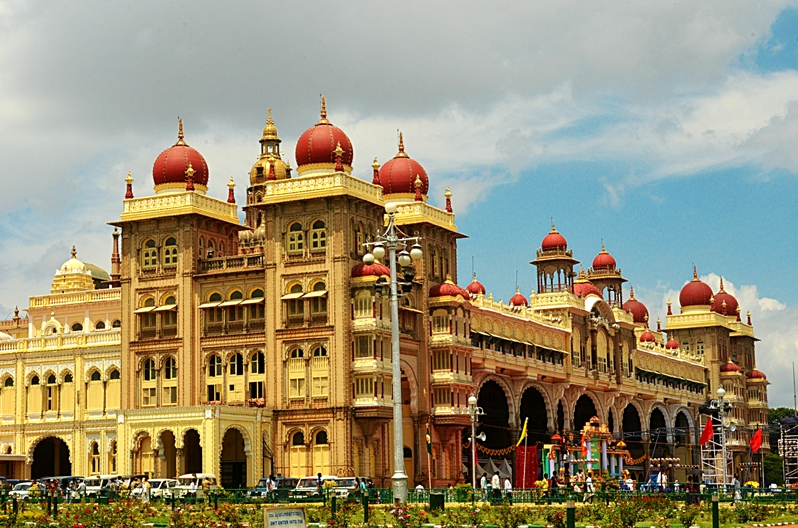
Day view of Mysore Palace at the time of Dasara festival

Cultural events and exhibition ( inaugurated for the festival which lasts till December) are part of the nine-day festival. On the first day on 5 October, the cultural programmes was launched in the evening with folk and classical music at the Amba Vilas Palace. During the nine-day festival period 150 cultural programmes have been arranged. The venue of these programmes are at the Kalamandira, Jaganmohan Palace, Gyanabharati, Town Hall, Kuppanna Park, and Chikka Gadiyara. On this occasion the prominent buildings and streets are also lighted.

Iconic artist Hema Malini, an actor and dance exponent, is presenting a dance ballet on 8 October. The doyen of Hindustani music Pandit Jasraj will give a musical concert on 13 October.

On this occasion, on the open grounds in front of the Maharaja College a Yuva Dasara (dasara for the youth) was scheduled to be held on 7 October featuring famous young singers like Sonu Nigam, Shaan and Sunidhi Chauhan, and Vijayprakash of Mysore who sang the famous "Jai Ho" song will entertain the audience.

Nancy Powell, the US Ambassador to India and the US Consul General from Chennai are special guests scheduled to attend the "Jamboo Savari" and "Torchlight Parade" on the tenth day of the festival.
