= 515 Army Base Workshop =

515 Army Base Workshop is a wing of Corps of Electronics and Mechanical Engineers (EME) of the Indian Army.

The 515 Army Base Workshop is one of the eight Army workshops located across India. The headquarters, Base Workshop Group, is in Meerut. These workshops come under the Corps of Electronics and Mechanical Engineers and employ an estimated 18,000 civilian workforce. The EME kept 97 per cent of the equipment in operationally fit condition during Operation Vijay.

== Task ==
The unit was tasked in 2002 to build and complete flight trials of spares for Unmanned Aerial Vehicle (UAV) Searcher and the indigenously developed UAV Nishant. The workshop also manufactures spares of various kinds of equipment and weapon systems used by Indian Army such as missiles, tanks (T-55 and T-72), Infantry Combat Vehicles (BMP 1 and BMP 2), Artillery guns (130 mm FD Gun and 155 mm Bofors guns).

The spare parts manufactured by the workshop were of critical importance and were extensively used during Operation Parakram.

The workshop produces small range training simulator Drona, and has installed it at various naval establishments, units of the Indian Air Force, and Assam Rifles. It is a hi-tech electronic and software based equipment designed to sharpen the firing skills of soldiers. The workshop also manufactures hand grenades and small arms range training simulators for Indian Army, which are Designed by Simulator Development Division Secunderabad and TOT (Transfer of Technology) carried out by SDD.

The workshop is undertaking indigenisation of spares required for mine-resistant vehicle Casspir, used in counter insurgency operations for transportation of troops.

Besides, the EME has a Station Workshop, which provides repair and maintenance support to various Defence establishments located in Bengaluru and four Maintainability Advisory Groups (MAGs) with public sector undertakings. The MAGs act as a link between the Army and industries engaged in Defence production. They are BEL, ITI, HAL, and LRDE. The MAGs look into aspects related to maintainability during design development and in-service phase of equipment being introduced or in use in the Army.

In August 2012, 515 Army Workshop was asked to double its production of Anti-Tank Guided Missiles (ATGM) simulators from 11 to 23. The workshop, which started ATGM simulators production in 2008 to meet growing requirements of Indian Army, has produced over 143 simulators. Simulators are used for effective virtual simulation for day and night engagement with a wide choice of terrain, target and attack profiles.

These simulators help perform evaluation of trainees and capabilities in engaging aerial targets without loss of life or expensive machinery.

Infantry Weapon Training Systems (IWTS) manufactured by 515 Workshop are adaptable for training on 7.62mm AK-47 rifles, Light Machine Guns, 9mm carbine and pistol and 5.56mm Realistic Imitation Firearm (RIF).

Virtual para-training and simulators produced by 515 Workshop help simulate standing near the aircraft’s exit and voice commands of various scenarios to check reactions for various commands, while the trainee is suspended by a harness and wears reality goggles projecting the images simulating an actual jump.

== See also ==
- Indian Army
- Siachen Base Camp
