= Abhimanyu (elephant) =

Lead elephant at the Mysuru Dasara in India

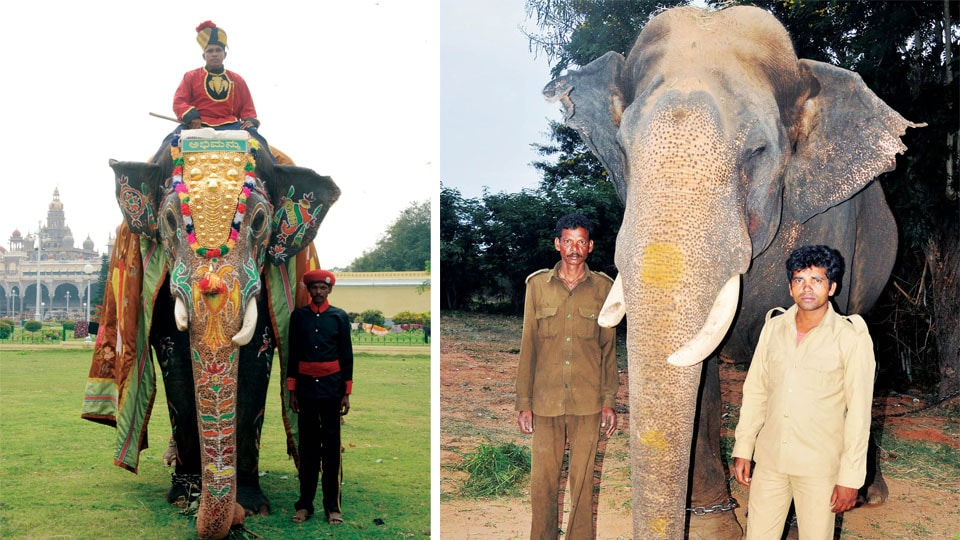
- Species: Asian elephant
- Sex: Male
- Born: c. 1964 (age 61–62)
- Nationality: Indian
- Occupation: Golden Howdah carrier, tiger capture (80+) and elephant capture (300+) specialist, leader and lead elephant in the last migration capture operation in Madhya Pradesh, India.
- Years active: 1977-2026
- Title: AK-47, Captain Abhimanyu, Kumki King
- Successor: Prashanta
- Weight: 5,635 kg (12,423 lb)
- Height: 2.78 m (9 ft 1 in)
- Named after: Abhimanyu

Abhimanyu (born c. 1964) is a male Asian elephant who, since 2020, has been the lead elephant and carrier of the Golden Howdah at the Mysore Dasara. Since 1977, he has been a lead Kumki elephant, playing a crucial role in more than 300 elephant captures and over 80 tiger captures across India. He is credited with capturing 90% of Karnataka elephants. He retired from Golden Howdah and Kumki operations in 2026.

Abhimanyu resides at the Mathigodu Elephant Camp. In July 2026, he chipped the tip of his left tusk while moving a log during routine work at the Mathigodu Elephant Camp. Veterinarians confirmed that he remained otherwise healthy and that the tusk was expected to regrow. He continued to take part in a tiger-tracking operation in Sarguru, Mysuru, shortly afterwards.

== See also ==
- List of individual elephants
