= Dronamraju =

Dronamraju (Telugu: ద్రోణంరాజు) is a Telugu surname. Notable people with the surname include:

- Dronamraju Krishna Rao (1937–2020), Indian geneticist
- Dronamraju Satyanarayana (1933–2006), Indian politician

== See also ==
- Drona (disambiguation)
- Raju (disambiguation)
