= Drona (elephant) =

Captured Indian elephant of the 20th century

- Species: Asian elephant
- Sex: Male
- Born: c. 1936
- Died: 1998 (aged 61–62); Balle, Heggadadevana kote, Karnataka, India
- Nationality: India
- Occupation: Golden Howdah carrier
- Years active: 1981–1997
- Predecessor: Airavatha

Drona (c. 1936 – 1998) was one of the lead Dasara Elephants of the Jamboo Savari of Mysore Dasara. He carried the Golden Howdah for a record 18 years consecutive years between 1981 and 1997, before being electrocuted while grazing in 1998. Of all the carrier elephants since the 20th century, he is considered the best "because he possessed an excellent ability to learn and correct himself".

== The name ==
The elephant was named after Drona, the great guru of Mahabharata. In the epic, Dronacharya is a priest, but he was so mature and intelligent that he taught warfare for a livelihood. The elephant Drona was named so because of his amazing ability to learn and correct himself.

== History ==
Drona was captured in a khedda operation in the Kakanakote forest area of Heggadadevana kote in 1971. He was used for a brief period in Shimoga to carry timber. Doddappaji was Drona's mahout. Doddappaji's association with Drona began from the day it was captured, as his father, Chennakeshavaiah, was in charge of taming it. Having grown up together, he understood the animal better than anyone else.

== The Mahout ==
Doddappaji, who once handled Drona, the elephant that carried the howdah, has refused to take part in the Dasara festivities since Drona was electrocuted. A third generation mahout and an expert in taming wild elephants, Doddappaji is haunted by memories of Drona. After the death of Drona, he has requested senior officials not to ask him to participate in the "Jamboo Savari." The mahout says he has not come across another elephant that matches the size and strength of Drona, whom people adored for his gentle behaviour.

== Death ==
Drona died of electrocution in 1998, when he was grazing in the Nagarhole National Park, that spans across the borders of Kodagu and Mysore districts of Karnataka. In a village, Balle, attempting to eat the leaves from a tree, he pulled down the trunk, which brought down a high-tension power cable and instantly electrocuted him. Following his death, Drona was mourned in Karnataka.

== See also ==
- List of individual elephants
