= Drona (simulator) =

Small-arms range training simulator

- Type: Virtual firearms training simulator
- Place of origin: India

Production history
- Designer: Simulator Development Division
- Manufacturer: 515 Army Base Workshop

Drona is a small-arms range training simulator for imparting realistic and cost-effective simulator-based weapons training. It was developed by Simulator Development Division and made by the 515 Army Base Workshop as both units are under the Electronics and Mechanical Engineers (EME).

Drona is an electronic and software-based equipment which reduces expenditure on ammunition, logistics and time spent on regular troop training by 40 to 50 per cent.

== Development ==
In 2002, it's reported that Egypt, Myanmar and Sri Lanka made orders for the Drona.

== Kit ==
Drona's equipment comprises either a single-lane or multi-lane (usually eight) firing stations connected to an instructor's server. Weapons such as the SLR, the 7.62mm LMG and the INSAS assault rifle/light machine gun can be used. At the firing station, user is shown computer-generated images to simulate different kinds of terrain and conditions. Other options include day and night firing, right and left-handed use and bi-lingual instructions in English and Hindi.

An instructor will sit in a sound-proof AC cabin to observe and guide the trainee.
