= Golden Howdah =

Carrier on the leading elephant in the Mysore Dasara

- Chinnada Ambari (Kannada)
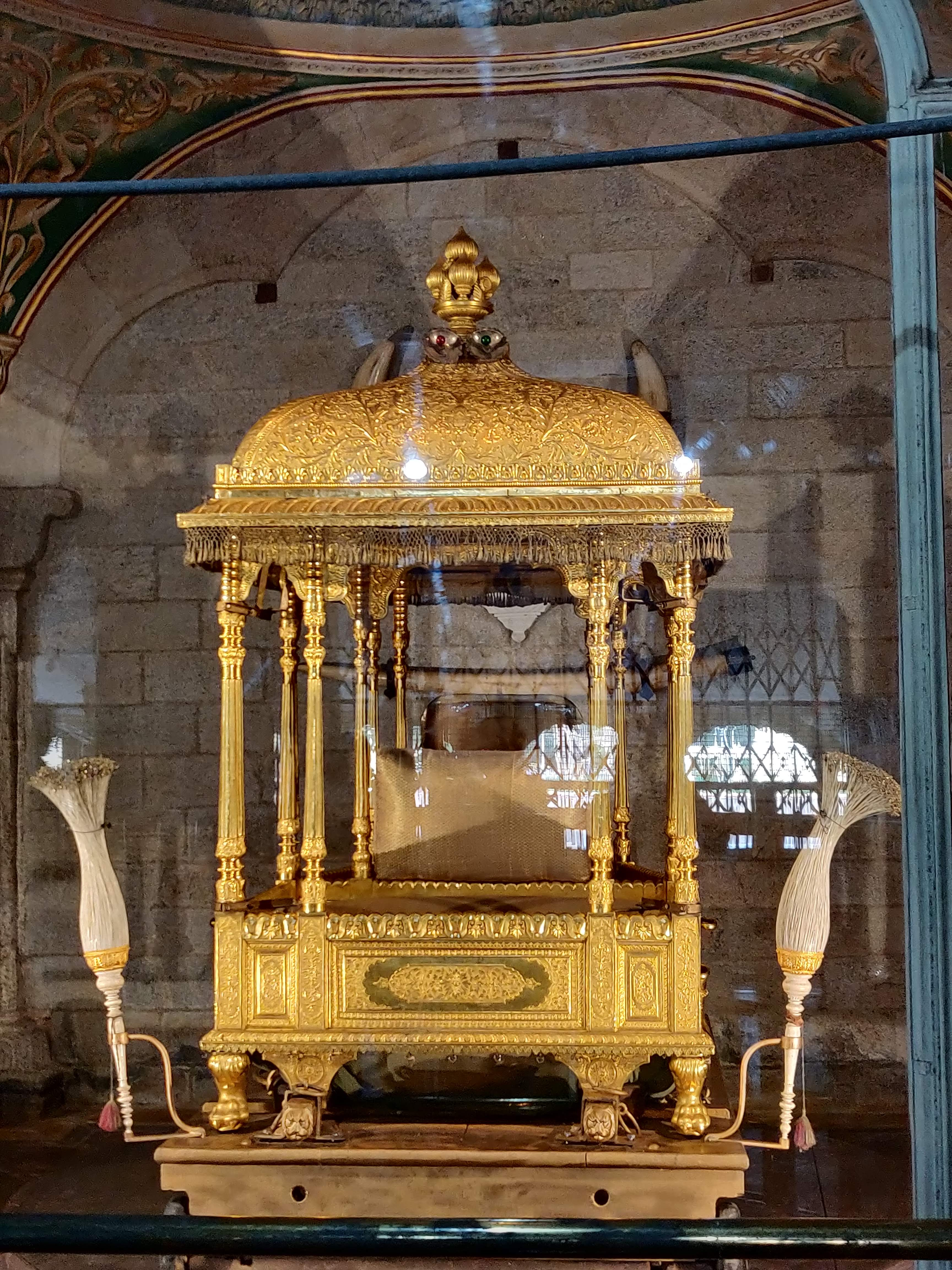
- Artist: Singannacharya
- Completion date: 19th century
- Medium: Woodcarving, Gilding
- Location: Amba Vilas Palace, Mysore

The Golden Howdah (Chinnada Ambari (ಚಿನ್ನದ ಅಂಬಾರಿ) in Kannada) is a howdah, the carrier mounted on the leading elephant during the Jamboo Savari (Elephant Procession) of the famous Mysore Dasara. In 2025, 60-year-old elephant Abhimanyu carried the Golden Howdah in the procession for the sixth and final time.

== The Golden Howdah ==
The exact date of its making is not known. The car-sized 750-kg howdah, used in the Jamboo Savari (elephant procession) on the Vijayadashami day, has two rows of wide seats. The Rajas of Mysore used this howdah in the famous Dasara procession, which traversed through the thoroughfares of the princely city during the festival every year. Since the abolition of royalty the statue of Chamundeshwari is carried in the howdah. The core structure is wood and it was covered in filigreed gold sheets weighing 85 kilograms by "Swarnakala Nipuna" Singannacharya. It has three carved pillars on each of the four sides. It is covered with a canopy resembling a crown. There are five sacred "Kalashas" on top of it. The seat itself is made of silver embellished with designs.

== The Procession ==
The Golden Howdah is mounted on the lead elephant with the idol of (Nadadevathe) Chamundeshwari placed in it. The procession passes through the Mysore city, beginning at Mysore Palace and terminating at Bannimantapa. The elephant carrying the howdah is trained and groomed to do the job years before it actually does it. The elephant Balarama participated in the procession 19 times and carried the howdah on thirteen occasions between 1999 and 2011. In 2012, the elephant Arjuna took over the task of carrying the howdah in processions.
