= Mahout =

Elephant rider, trainer, or keeper

- Mahout
- Country: Historical India; Kingdom of Sri Lanka
- Branch: Cavalry (melee)

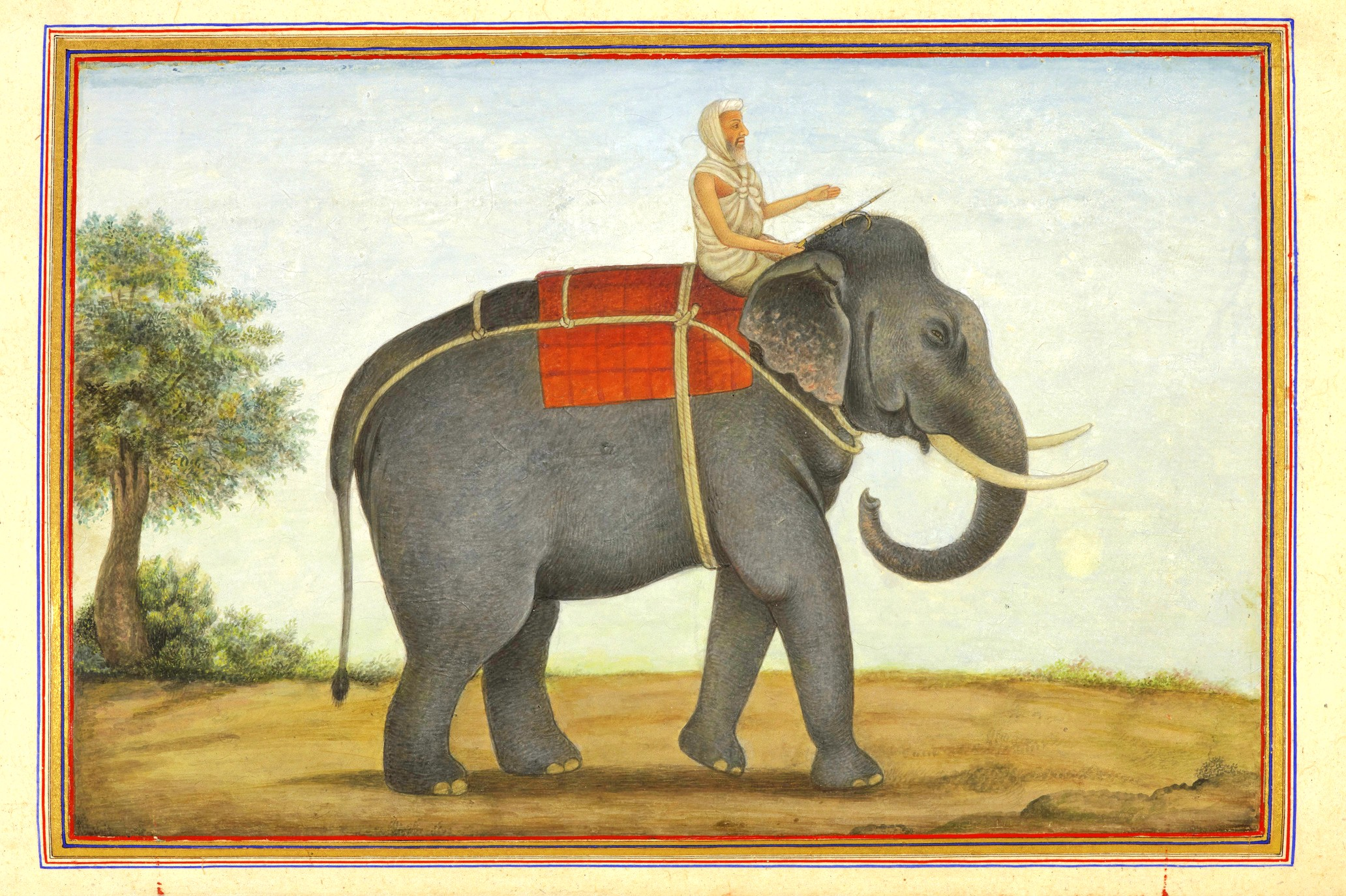
An image of the elephant keeper in India riding his elephant from Tashrih al-aqvam (1825).

A mahout is an elephant rider, trainer, or keeper. Mahouts were used since antiquity for both civilian and military use. Traditionally, mahouts came from ethnic groups with generations of elephant keeping experience, with a mahout retaining his elephant throughout its working life or service years.

== Etymology ==
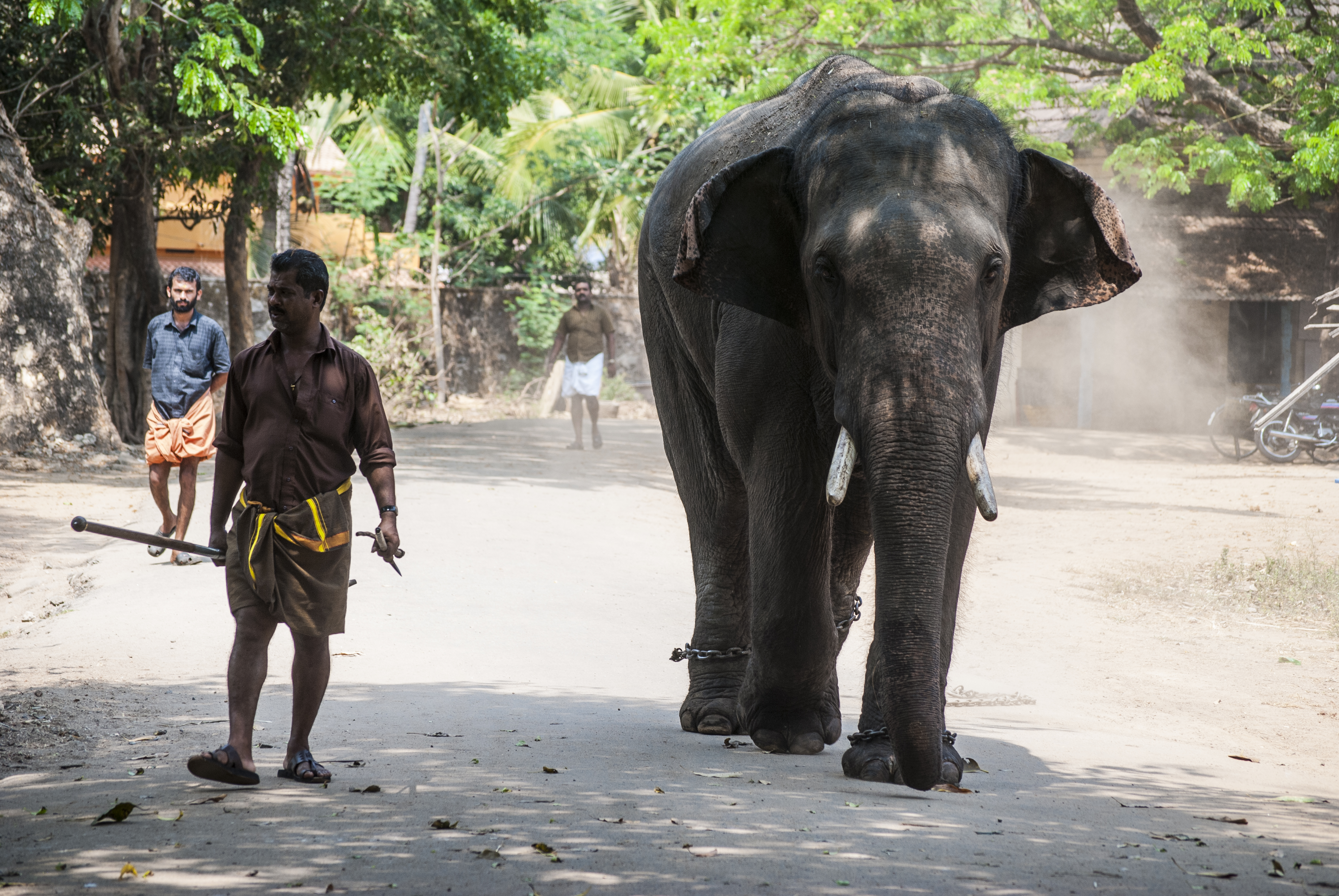
A young elephant and his mahout, Kerala, India

The word mahout derives from the Hindi words mahaut (महौत) and mahāvat (महावत), and originally from the Sanskrit mahāmātra (महामात्र).

Another term is cornac or kornak, which entered many European languages via Portuguese. This word derives ultimately from the Sanskrit term karināyaka, a compound of karin (elephant) and nayaka (leader). In Kannada, a person who takes care of elephants is called a maavuta, and in Telugu the word used is mavati; this word is also derived from Sanskrit. In Tamil, the word used is pahan, which means 'elephant keeper', and in Sinhala kurawanayaka ('stable master'). In Malayalam the word used is paappaan.

In Burma, the profession is called u-si; in Thailand kwan-chang (ควาญช้าง); and in Vietnam quản tượng.

== Equipment ==
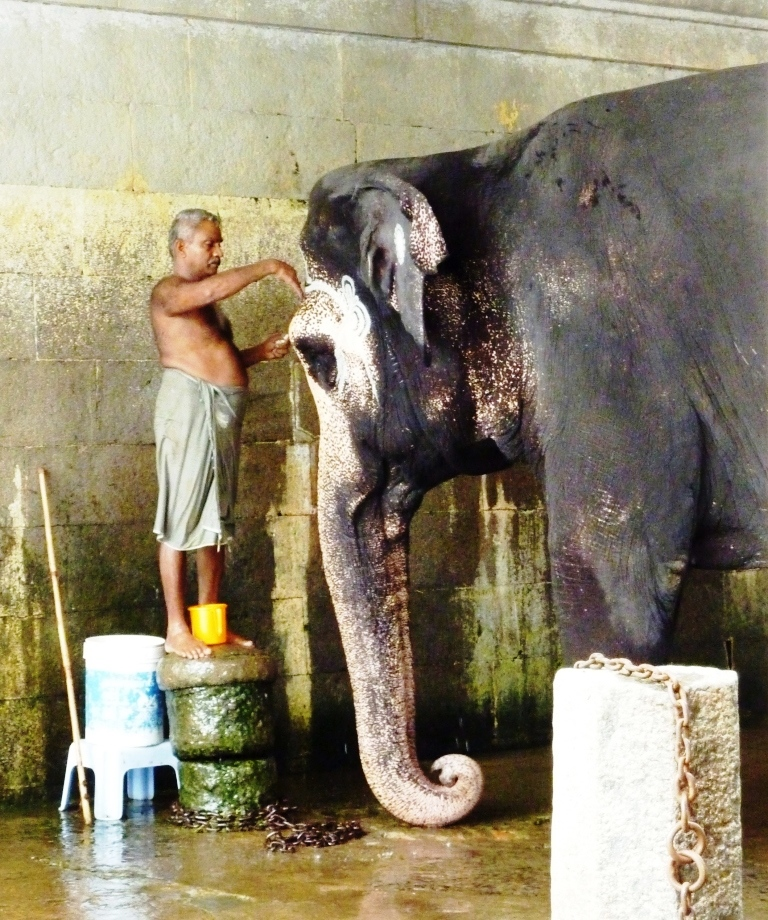
Mahout washing his elephant. Temple in Kanchipuram

The most common tools used by mahouts are chains and the aṅkuśa (goad, also ankus or anlius) – a sharp metal hook used as guide in the training and handling of the elephant.

In India, especially Kerala, mahouts use three types of device to control elephants. The thotti (hook), which is 107 cm (3.5 feet) in length and about 2.5 cm (1 inch) thick; the valiya kol (long pole), which is 320 cm (10.5 feet) in length and about 2.5 cm (1 inch) in thickness; and the cheru kol (short pole).

== Society ==
Elephants, and therefore also mahouts, have long been integral to politics and the economy throughout Southern and South-eastern Asia. The animals are given away per request of government ministers and sometimes as gifts. In addition to more traditional occupations, today mahouts are employed in many countries by forestry services and the logging industry, as well as in tourism.

== Culture ==
Elephants can remember tone, melody, and words, allowing them to recognise more than 20 verbal commands. The Singapore Zoo featured a show called "elephants at work and play" until 2018, where the elephants' caretakers were referred to as "mahouts", and demonstrated how elephants are used as beasts of burden in Southeast Asia. The verbal commands given to the elephants by the mahouts are all in Sinhala, one of the two official languages of Sri Lanka.

A shop display advertising "Mahout" cigarettes features prominently in the background of the "rain dance" sequence of the 1952 Gene Kelly film Singin' in the Rain. The word "mahout" also features in the lyrics of the song "Drop the Pilot", by Joan Armatrading.

George Orwell's essay "Shooting an Elephant" discusses the relationship of an elephant to its mahout: "It was not, of course, a wild elephant, but a tame one which had gone 'must.' It had been chained up, as tame elephants always are when their attack of 'must' is due, but on the previous night it had broken its chain and escaped. Its mahout, the only person who could manage it when it was in that state, had set out in pursuit, but had taken the wrong direction and was now twelve hours' journey away..."
