= Mysore Dasara =

State-festival of Karnataka, India

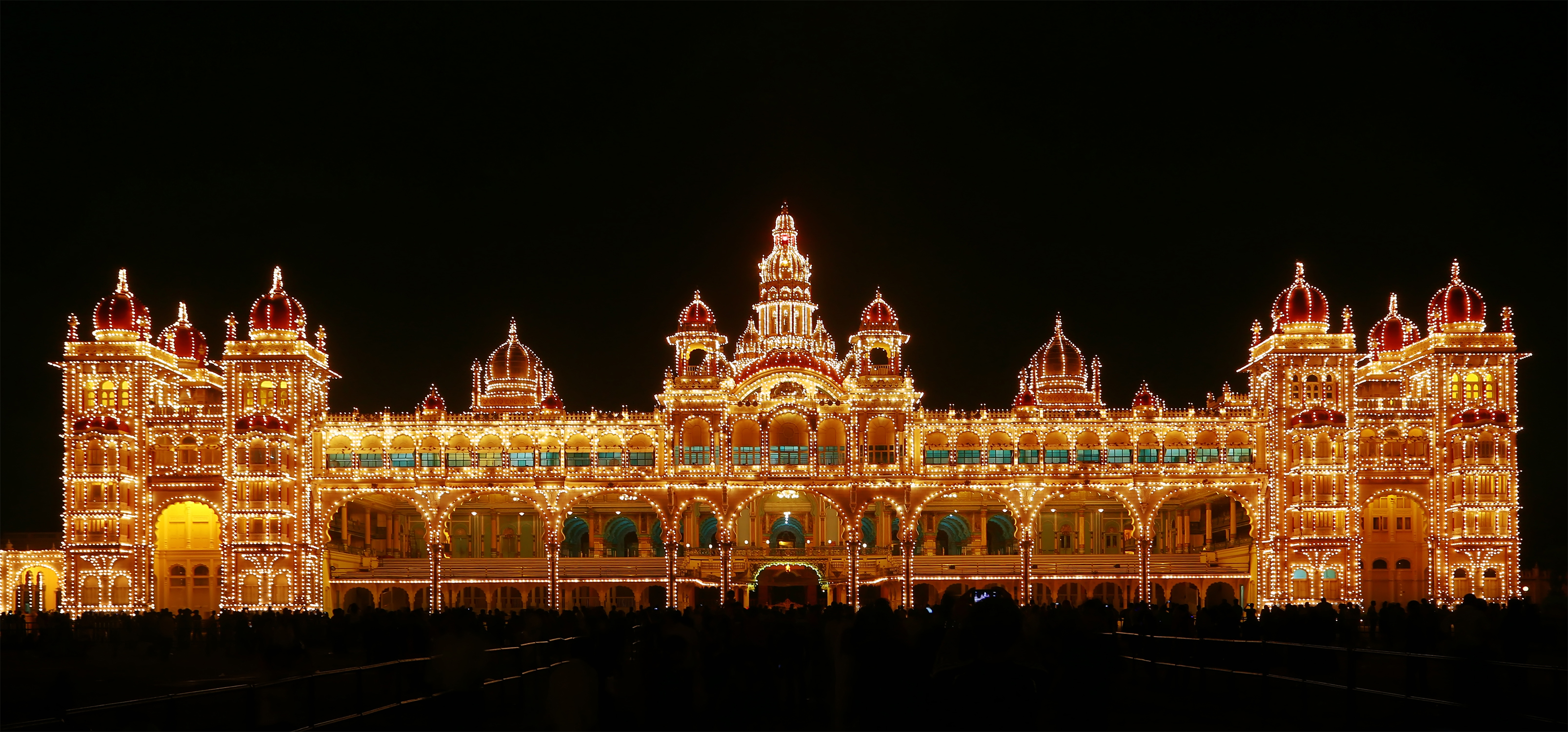
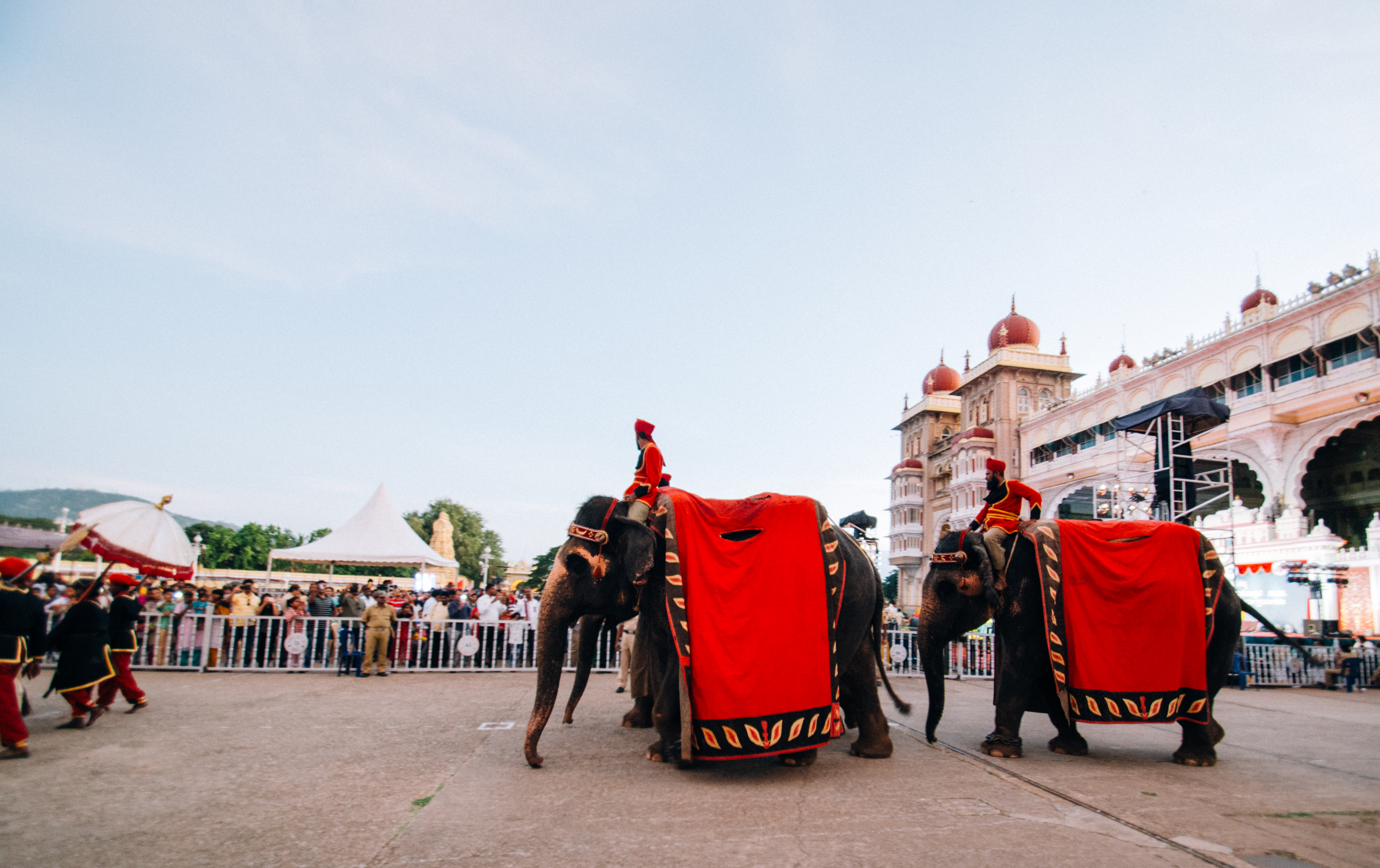
- (Top to bottom, L-R) Mysore Palace illuminated during the festival, procession of Goddess Chamundeshwari's idol, elephant procession on Vijayadashami
- Type: Cultural, Religious (Hindu)
- Significance: Marking the victory of good over evil
- Celebrations: Lighting Mysuru Palace, Ramayana theatre, mela (fairs), processions and parades
- Begins: September/October per Hindu calendar
- Ends: 2025
- Duration: 9 days
- Frequency: Annual
- First time: 17–27 September 1610
- Related to: Chamundeshwari (goddess Shakti), Durga, Mahishasura, The Ramayana, the Vijayanagara Empire, the Kingdom of Mysore, the Wadiyar dynasty

Mysore Dasara is the state festival in the state of Karnataka in India. It is a 10 day festival, starting with nine nights called Navaratri and the last day being Vijayadashami. The festival is observed on the tenth day in the Hindu calendar month of Ashvina, which typically falls in the Gregorian months of September and October.

The Hindu festival of Navaratri and its occasion of Vijayadashami celebrates the victory of good over evil. According to Hindu mythology, it commemorates the day the goddess Chamundeshwari (Durga) slew the demon Mahishasura. Mahishasura is also believed to be the demon whose slaying by the goddess gave the city the name Mysuru. The Mysuru tradition celebrates the warriors and the state fighting for the good during this festival, ritually worshipping and displaying the state sword, weapons, elephants, horses, along with the goddess in her warrior form (predominantly) as well as the avatar of puri, Ramu. The ceremonies and a major procession is traditionally presided by the king of Mysuru.

The city of Mysuru has a long tradition of celebrating the Dasara festival with grandeur and pomp to mark the festival. The Dasara festival in Mysuru completed 409th anniversary in the year 2019, while evidence suggests the festivities were observed in Karnataka state by the Vijayanagara Empire kings in the 15th century.

== History ==
The Dussehra festivities were held in the Vijayanagar kings as early as the 14th-15th Century. The exact origin of the festival and how long back it dates is unknown. The festival played a historical role in the 14th-century Vijayanagara Empire, where it was called Mahanavami and the festivities are shown in the relief artwork of the outer wall of the Hazara Rama temple of Hampi.

The Italian traveller Niccolò de' Conti described the festival's intensity and importance as a grandeur religious and martial event with royal support. The event revered Durga as the warrior goddess (some texts refer to her as Chamundeshwari). The celebrations hosted athletic competitions, singing and dancing, fireworks, a pageantry military parade and charitable giving to the public.

After the fall of the Vijayanagar to Deccan Sultanates, these Hindu celebrations came to an end under Muslim rulers. The Wodeyars of Mysore formed a kingdom in Southern parts of the Vijayanagara Empire and continued the Mahanavami (Dasara) festival celebration, a tradition started initially by Raja Wodeyar I (1578-1617 CE) in mid September 1610 at Srirangapatna.

== Festivities ==
2019 Mysore Dasara

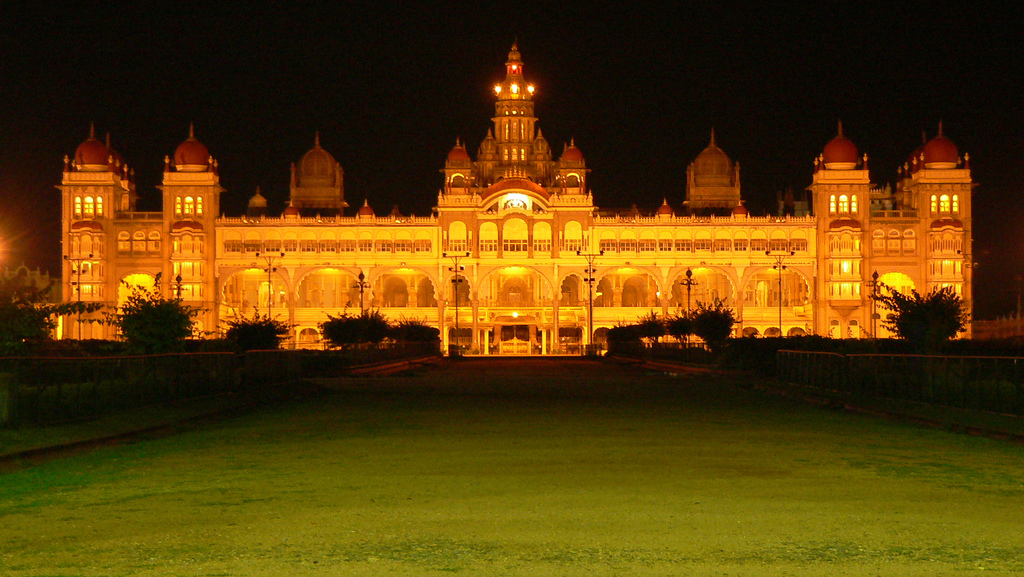
A lit up Mysore Palace, the epicenter of all Dasara festivities held in Mysore

The festivities included a special durbar (royal assembly). It was during the reign of Krishnaraja Wodeyar III in the year 1805, when the king started the tradition of having a special durbar in the Mysore Palace during Dasara; which was attended by members of the royal family, special invitees, officials and the masses. After the death of Srikanta Wadiyar in December 2013, Dasara celebration in 2014 was celebrated by placing the "Pattada Katti" (royal sword) on the golden throne. But since his accession to the throne in 2015, Maharaja Yaduveer Krishnadatta Chamaraja Wadiyar have been holding the Dasara celebration and durbar. The ninth day of Dasara called as Mahanavami is also an auspicious day on which the royal sword is worshipped and is taken on a procession involving elephants, camels and horses.

== Lights in Mysore Palace ==
The main attraction of the ten-day Mysore Dasara festival is the Mysore Palace which is lighted daily with nearly 100,000 light bulbs from 7 pm to 10 pm on all days of the festival. Various cultural and religious programs highlighting the dance, music and culture of the State of Karnataka are performed in front of the illuminated Palace.

== Procession ==
On Vijayadashami, the traditional Dasara procession (locally known as "jumboo Savari") is held on the streets of Mysore city. The main attraction of this procession is the idol of the Goddess Chamundeshwari which is placed on a golden mantapa (which is around 750 kilograms of gold) on the top of a decorated elephant. This idol is worshipped by the royal couple and other invitees before it is taken around in the procession. Colourful tableaux, dance groups, music bands, decorated elephants, horses and camels form a part of the procession which starts from the Mysore Palace and culminates at a place called Bannimantap where the banni tree (Prosopis spicigera) is worshipped. According to a legend of the Mahabharata, banni tree was used by the Pandavas to hide their weapons during their one-year period of Agnatavasa (living life incognito). Before undertaking any warfare, the kings traditionally worshipped this tree to help them emerge victorious in the war. The Dasara festivities would culminate on the night of Vijayadashami with an event held in the grounds at Bannimantap called as Panjina Kavayatthu (torch-light parade).

In Mysore, India, the Vijayadashami Elephant procession during Mysore Dasara is called Jumbo Savari (from the British during their control of Mysore State). The original name to this procession is Jumbi Savari ("going to the Shami (Banni) tree"). Now Goddess Chamundeshwari is taken in procession on an Elephant. But the "Jumbo" name is still intact.

After the Jamboo Savari, a torchlight parade takes place in the evening at the Bannimantap Parade Grounds.

== Exhibition ==
Another major attraction during Dasara is the Dasara exhibition which is held in the exhibition grounds opposite to the Mysore Palace. The exhibition was started by the Maharaja of Mysore Chamarajendra Wadiyar X in 1880 with the sole aim of introducing timely developments to the people of Mysore. The task of holding the exhibition is now entrusted with the Karnataka Exhibition Authority (KEA). This exhibition starts during Dasara and goes on till December. Various stalls which sell items like clothes, plastic items, kitchenware, cosmetics and eatables are set up and they attract a significant number of people. A play area containing attractions like a Ferris wheel is also present to provide entertainment to the people. Various Governmental agencies setup stalls to signify the achievements and projects that they have undertaken.

== Other programmes ==
On all the 10 days of Dasara, various music and dance concerts are held in auditoriums around Mysore city. Musicians and dance groups from all over India are invited to perform on this occasion. Another attraction during Dasara is the Kusti Spardhe (wrestling-bout) which attracts wrestlers from all around India. There are other events at bannimantap where various groups do bike parades etc.

== Controversy ==
The Dasara procession has faced increasing pressure from activists and campaigners to end its controversial use of elephants. Procession elephants, as well as their handlers known as 'mahouts', have died from several shocking incidents over the years.

In 2018, leaked footage from the elephants' training ground showed an elephant swaying in distress. International press labelled the video "heartbreaking", and reported on how the elephants must undergo two months of "rigorous training" in order to perform in the procession.

The Government's decision to invite the Booker Prize laureate Banu Mushtaq to kick off the 2025 Mysore Dasara celebrations involving pooja to Goddess Bhuvaneshvari was met with opposition and when a video of her criticizing the devotion of the Kannada language in the form of Goddess Bhuvaneshwari went viral. Petitioners filed court cases regarding religious incompatibility between her and Dasara, a historically Hindu festival but the petitions were dismissed by the Courts.

== See also ==
- Arjuna, the lead elephant of the Mysore Dasara procession
- Dasara (disambiguation) — uses of the term in other Indian states
- Dasara Elephants
- Mysore Dasara 2013
