= Thanjavur Museum =

Heritage museum in Tamil Nadu, India

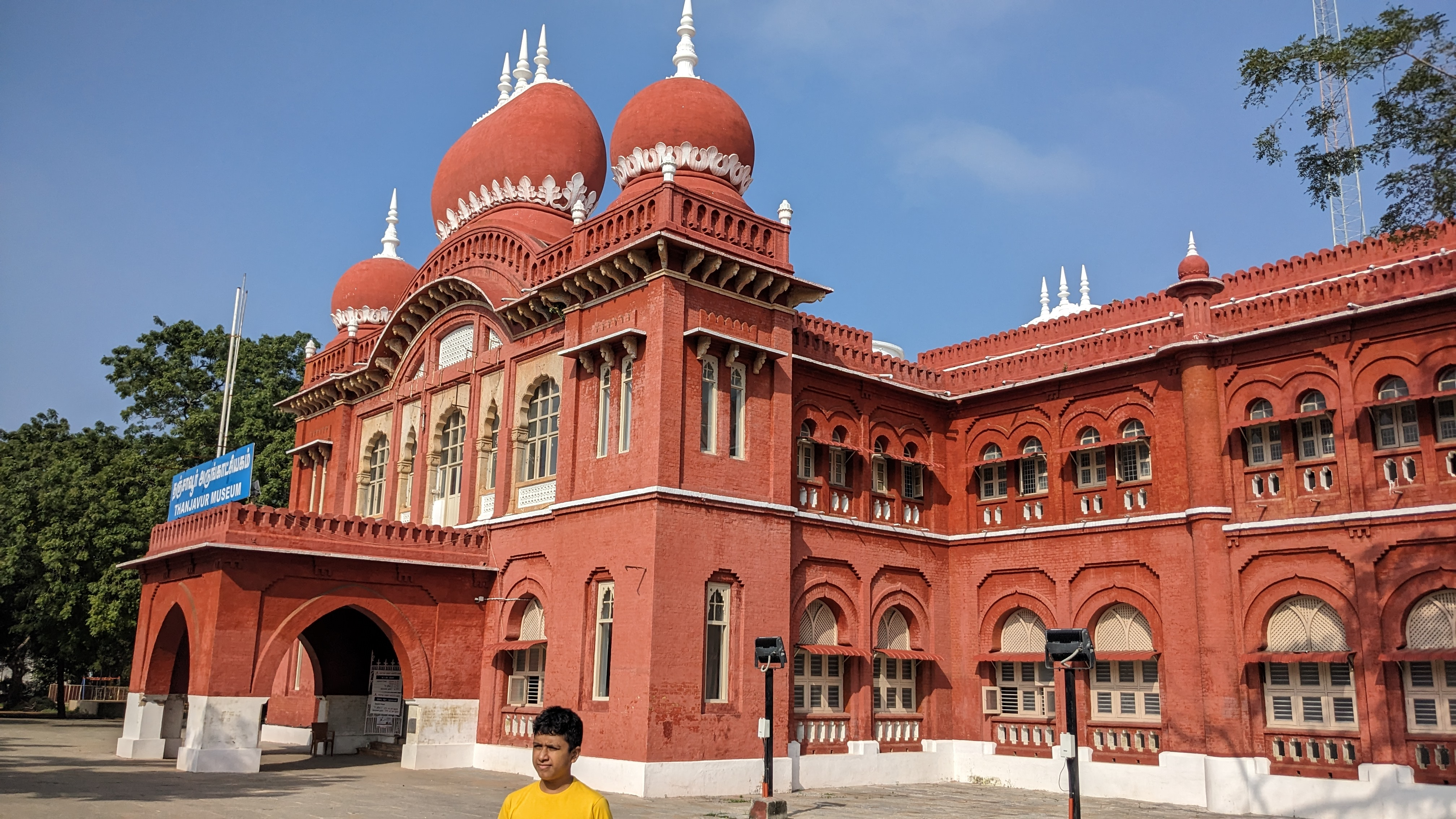
Thanjavur Museum

Thanjavur Museum is a museum where various heritage items are displayed to the public to illustrate the heritage of Thanjavur district. It is located in Thanjavur, the capital of Thanjavur district in Tamil Nadu, India.

== Background ==
The Thanjavur Museum is housed in a building that formerly served as the District Collector's office in the city of Thanjavur. The building was built about 120 years ago in 1900 by British architect Robert Chisol. The building is built in the Saracen style of architecture. Following the relocation of the collector's office which was functioning here, the district administration decided to build a museum based on the Smart City mission at a cost of 9.90 crore. The work was completed and it was opened to the public on January 14, 2023.

== Exhibits ==
Thanjavur museum exhibits 10 geo-tagged (GI) objects of Thanjavur origin and various heritage objects illustrating the heritage of Thanjavur district. Information boards explaining the specialties of the district are also installed. Showrooms have also been set up on behalf of government departments. A park with around 600 species of birds brought from 20 countries has also been set up to attract visitors.
