= Cheluvamba Mansion =

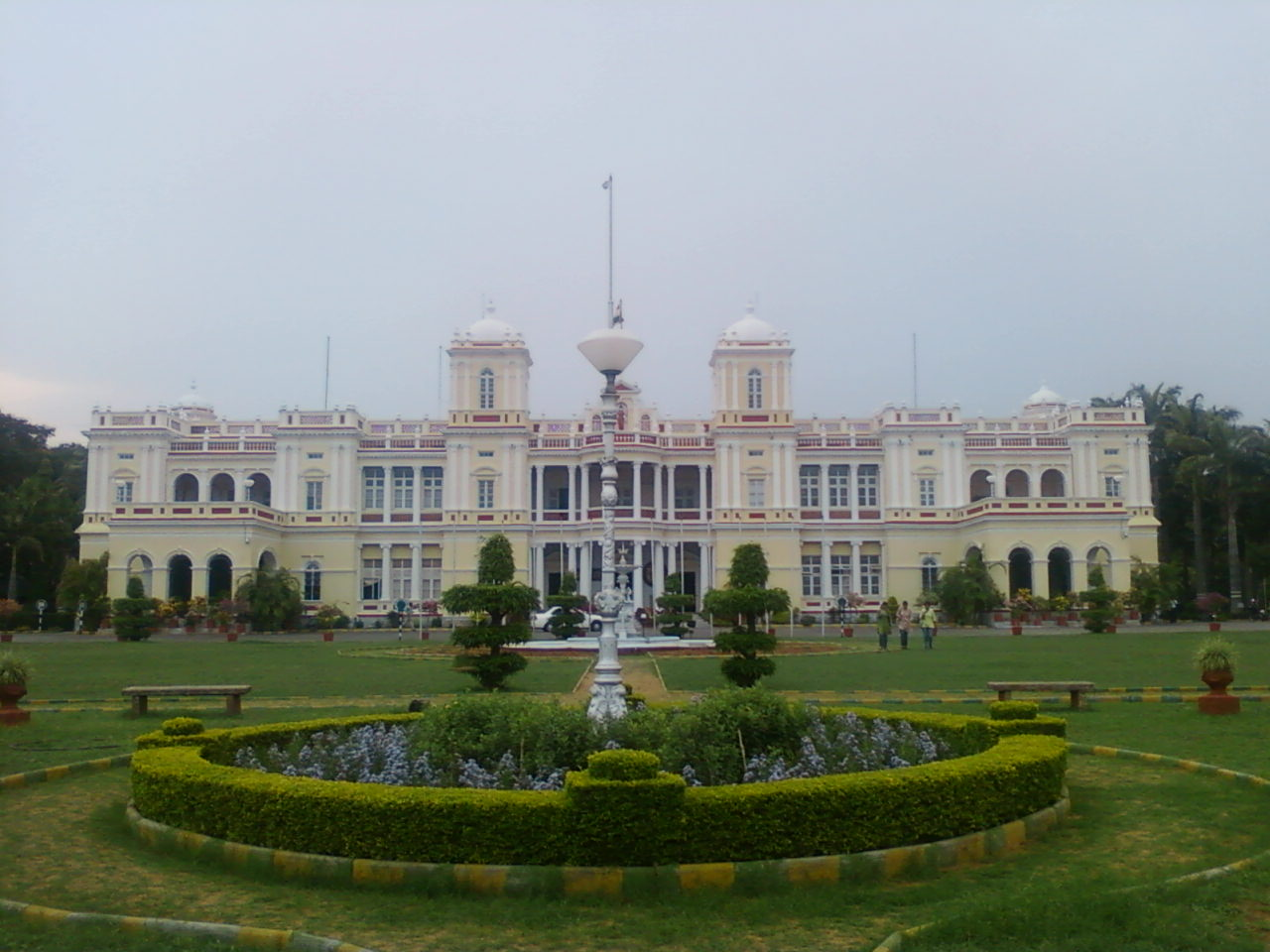
- Cheluvamba Mansion
- Interactive map of the Cheluvamba Mansion area

General information
- Type: Mansion
- Architectural style: Indo-Saracenic
- Location: Mysore, Karnataka, India
- Coordinates: 12.316369°N 76.639140°E
- Current tenants: Central Food Technological Research Institute

Cheluvamba Mansion is located in the city of Mysore, Karnataka. It was built by Maharaja Krishnaraja Wodeyar IV for the third princess of Mysore, Cheluvajammanni and it is similar to other mansions built by them which are spread over a large area surrounded by gardens. This mansion is crafted like other buildings of the Wadiyar dynasty. It has Indo-Saracenic architecture style. Today, the mansion is the regional headquarters of the Central Food Technological Research Institute (CFTRI), one of India’s premier scientific research institutions under the Council of Scientific and Industrial Research (CSIR). Cheluvamba Mansion is a rare instance of a royal residential palace repurposed into a modern scientific facility, while still retaining its heritage and architectural integrity.

== History ==
Cheluvamba Mansion was commissioned during the reign of Krishnaraja Wadiyar IV (ruled 1894–1940). It was constructed as a residence for Princess Cheluvajammanni, one of the sisters of the Maharaja. The construction is believed to have been completed around the 1910s or early 1920. The mansion was part of the larger vision of Krishnaraja Wadiyar IV to modernize Mysore while preserving its royal character. Cheluvamba Mansion occupied a prominent place along with other princely estates like Jayalakshmi Vilas, Karanji Mansion, and Lalitha Mahal, which served various members of the extended royal family.

After Indian independence in 1947, the Kingdom of Mysore was integrated into the Indian Union, many royal properties, including Cheluvamba Mansion, came under government control. In 1950, as part of a strategic initiative to advance food technology in India, the Council of Scientific and Industrial Research (CSIR) acquired the mansion to house the newly established Central Food Technological Research Institute (CFTRI). This transformation was both symbolic and functional: the palatial mansion became the epicenter of India’s post-independence scientific efforts in nutrition and food preservation.

== Architecture and Design ==
Cheluvamba Mansion is a classic example of the Indo-Saracenic architectural style, a synthesis of Hindu, Islamic, and European influences that gained popularity in British India in the late 19th and early 20th centuries. Like other buildings constructed during the Wadiyar era, it reflects a high level of craftsmanship and attention to detail. The exterior is painted in a soft cream or pale yellow tone with white ornamentation, typical of Wadiyar aesthetics. The roofline features domed pavilions (chhatris) and miniature towers (turrets) that echo Rajput and Mughal palace forms, while the sloping tiled roofs are adapted to the local monsoon climate.

== Central Food Technological Research Institute (CFTRI) ==
Now this mansion is home to the premier research institute of the country Central Food Technological Research Institute (CFTRI). It has maintained the mansion well since prime minister Jawaharlal Nehru formally received the building in December 1948 and officially it was inaugurated on 21 October 1950.

== Preservation ==
Though not a protected monument under the Archaeological Survey of India (ASI), Cheluvamba Mansion is classified as a heritage structure by the State Department of Archaeology, Museums, and Heritage, Karnataka. Regular maintenance is conducted by CSIR-CFTRI, which has retained the structure’s external character while retrofitting the interiors for laboratories, conference rooms, and administrative offices. In recent years, there have been calls by conservationists to declare the mansion a Grade-I heritage structure to ensure its long-term preservation. In 2010, the Karnataka government proposed a heritage corridor linking Cheluvamba Mansion with other royal structures like the Mysore Palace and Jayalakshmi Vilas.

== See also ==
- List of Heritage Buildings in Mysore
