= Hardwick High School and College =

Coordinates: 12.3004°N 76.6434°E

Hardwicke High School and College
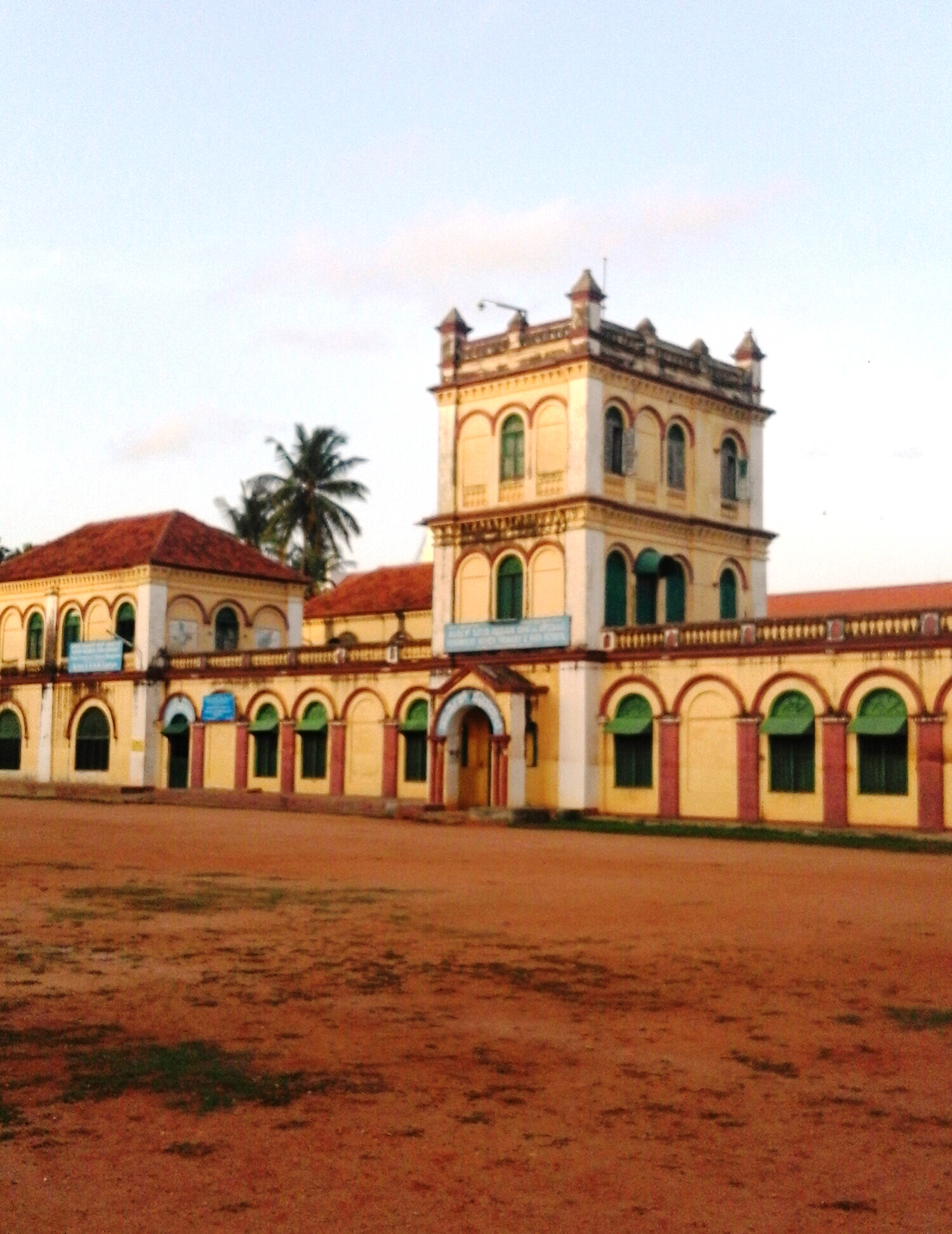
- Hardwicke College main building

Location
- J. L. B. Road, Chamarajapuram, Mysore 570005 India

Information
- Type: Private
- Established: 1840; 186 years ago
- Campus: Urban

Hardwick High School and College is an educational institute in Mysore. The school offers primary, higher primary, high school, and pre-university level education.

== History ==
Formerly known as Wesleyan High School and Methodist Mission High School, Hardwicke High School and Pre-University College was founded in 1840 during the Commission Rule and the nominal reign of Maharaja Krishnaraja Wodeyar III.

Rev. Harold Spencer BA (1876 - 1966) was a previous principal. Writing Kangalese Grammar, accepted at the time across India.

Alongside teaching he edited the "Harvest Home", a monthly missionary journal.

== Subsidiaries ==
- Hardwicke Church, Vani Vilas Road, Mysore

== Alumni ==
- Kuvempu, Kannada Poet
- Avinash, film actor

== See also ==
- List of Heritage Buildings in Mysore
