= Chittaranjan Palace =

Coordinates: 12.322279°N 76.617459°E

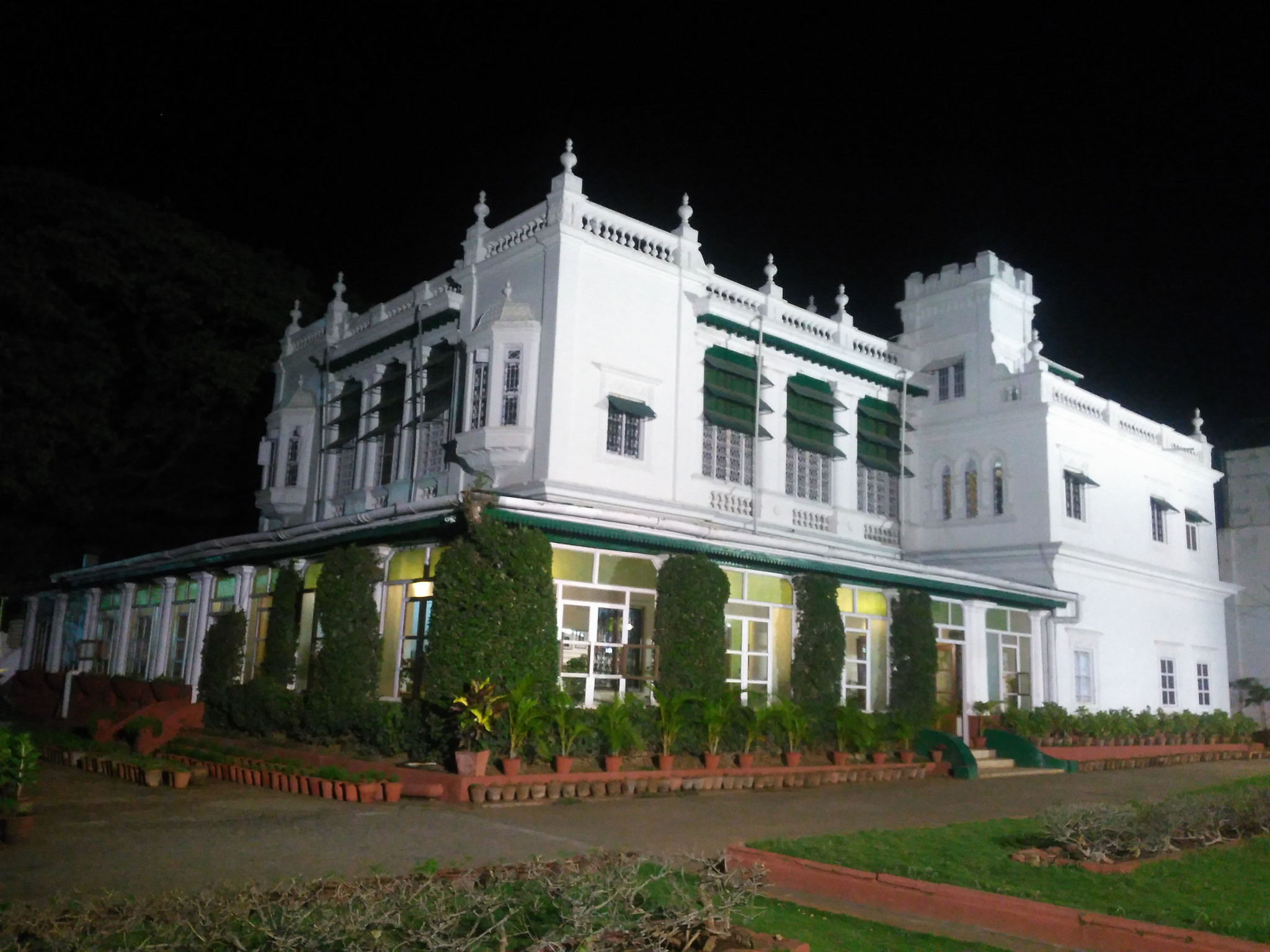
Chittaranjan Palace, Mysore

Chittaranjan Palace is a lesser-known palace at Mysore that was originally built for a princess of the Mysore royal family. It presently houses the "Green Hotel". It is a small hotel with 31 rooms and is eco-friendly (solar power, no AC, no TV, etc.). The profits from the hotel are given to charity.

== History ==
Chittaranjan Palace was built by the Maharaja of Mysore for his sister in 1916. The palace was sold to a Mysorean family who then converted it into the headquarters of a film company, "Premier Studios". Many films and TV shows were shot, including the famous TV serial The Sword of Tipu Sultan. The studio was closed down after a fire broke out but was still owned and operated by the same family that owned Premier Studio. The building was used as a private residence until it was converted into a hotel, called "Green Hotel" in the 1970s. The same family still has a major stake in the hotel and the residence as a whole.

== See also ==
- List of Heritage Buildings in Mysore
