= List of Heritage Buildings in Mysore =

This article contains a list of heritage monuments and edifices in and around Mysore city. The city of Mysore features a number of historical structures built before the Indian Independence as well as modern classical-architecture buildings raised since then.

The history of Mysore city, in particular, and of the Deccan Plateau in general, spans across both the pre- and post-Independence eras. Mysore is believed to have been formed into a republic even before the mythical times of Medieval India. The regions in and around the Mysore belts find mentioning from Vedic scripts, where the region is termed as Mahishaka (the mighty/great kingdom).

== History ==
Over the centuries, before and after the Common Era, the region was ruled by different, numerous dynasties, mostly South Indian ones, like the Rashtrakutas, the Western Chalukyas, the Hoysalas, and others, until it was ruled by the last dynasty, the Wadiyars, the government of whose kingdom was transferred to them by its superior predecessor, the Vijayanagara Empire, in 1399, and gradually, the Vijayanagara Empire itself declined to its entirety, resulting in the Wadiyar dynasty's being the very last principal Indian royal family to have ruled the South.

== Patrons during Princely India ==
Most of the construction works undertaken by earlier empires and monarchies have either been completely destroyed over time, owing to rampages of the Deccan Sultanates, or have been dismantled by the following monarchies. However, most of the structures in Mysore City, and in fact, in the cities in the Kingdom of Mysore, which includes as close as Bangalore, Erode, Shimoga, Chitradurga, among others, were built between the early 1700s and the late 1940s, and are, hence, often attributed to the Wadiyars.

Since Mysore was the capital city of the kingdom for almost six centuries (excluding, of course, shifting the capital to Seringapatam for a brief period during Hyder Ali and Tipu Sultan's rule), the Wadiyars were directly supervising the construction and progress of the city. Construction in other Mysore Kingdom cities were delegated to subordinates, like that of Bangalore to Kempe Gowda I (between 1510 and 1569 under Chamaraja Wodeyar II and Chamaraja Wodeyar III), Shimoga to Shivappa Nayaka (between 1645 and 1660 under Kanthirava Narasaraja I), et cetera. After the decline of strong subordinates and the influence of British rule, the Wadiyars became principal, direct rulers of Mysore Kingdom, with supervisors mostly being the Diwans (Prime Ministers) of Mysore and British agents. Therefore, while other cities attribute their progress to the subordinates of the Wadiyars, Mysore credits all its progress to the Wadiyars. After the abolishment of absolute monarchy, most of the structures are being used by the democratic government bodies, like the Indian Government's using Cheluvamba Vilas Palace as CFTRI, University of Mysore's using Jayalakshmi Vilas Palace as University Museum and Oriental Research Library as Museum Library, and the Karnataka Government's using several palaces for tourism attraction, just to name a few within Mysore city.

== List of Pre-Independence Edifices ==
Historical and heritage buildings in Mysore
Year	Building	Name	Currently
Palaces
1861		Jaganmohana Palace	Currently, Shri Jayachamarajendra Arts Gallery and Jaganmohana Palace Arts and Crafts Museum
1905		Jayalakshmi Vilas Palace	Now, Jayalakshmi Vilas Mansion
1912		Mysore Palace	Palace: temporary tenant: Government of Karnataka; owners: the royal family
1916		Chittaranjan Palace	Currently, The Green Hotel, an eco-friendly hotel
1918		Cheluvamba Vilas Palace	Currently, Cheluvamba Vilas Mansion; used by CFTRI
1921		Lalithamahal Palace	Currently, The Lalitha Mahal Palace Hotel, a three-star hotel
1924		Rajendra Vilas Palace	Now, a private palace of the royal family
Academic Buildings
1840		Hardwick High School	
1851		Maharaja's College	
1876		Marimallappa's High School	
1854		Sadvidya Educational Institute	
1887		Oriental Research Institute Mysore	A national library
1915		Crawford Hall	University of Mysore
1917		Maharani's College	
1917		Chamarajendra Technical Institute	
1924		Mysore Medical College	
		Sri Chamarajendra Ursu Boarding School	
1927		Yuvaraja's College	
1940		D Banumaiah's Post-Graduation College	
1940		D Banumaiah's College of Commerce and Arts	
Government Buildings
1840		DC Office	
1895		Public Offices	
1899		Law Court Buildings	
Public Buildings
1870		Railway Station	
1879		Lansdowne Building	Commercial Complex
1884		Town Hall	
1886		Devaraja Market	Commercial Complex
1889		Cheluvamba Hospital	
1918		Krishnarajendra Hospital	
Religious Buildings
1670s		Chamundeshwari Temple	
1810		The Parakala Mutt	
1933		St Philomina's Church	
1925		Masjid E Azam	
