= C V Rangacharlu Memorial Hall =

Coordinates: 12.309795°N 76.655879°E

Rangacharlu Memorial Hall
- Town Hall
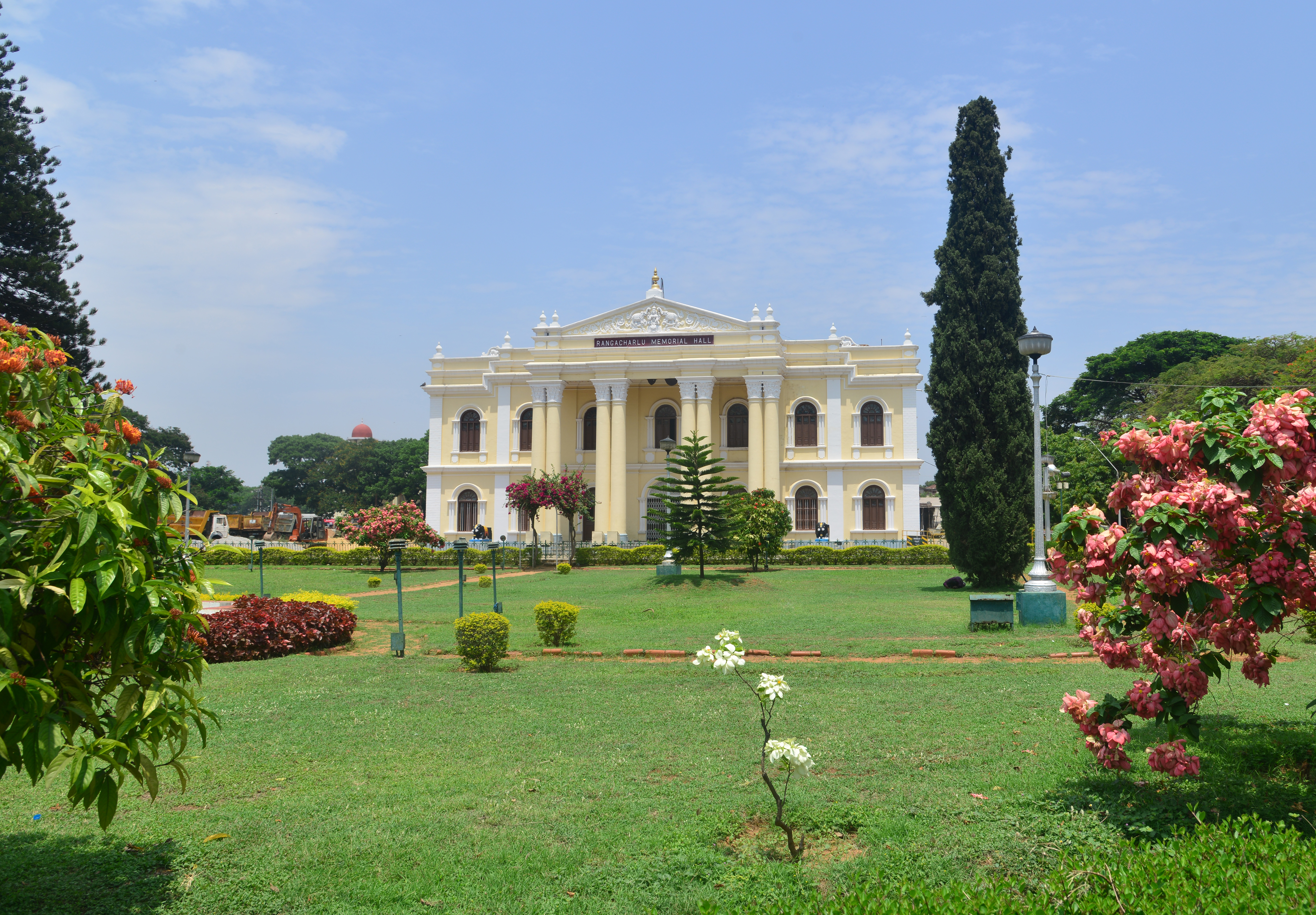
- Front facade, 2015
- Alternative names: Mysore Town Hall
- Etymology: Named after Diwan Sir C. V. Rungacharlu

General information
- Type: Town hall
- Architectural style: Neoclassical architecture
- Location: Mysore; India, Chamarajendra Wadiyar Circle, Big Clock Tower, Mysore
- Named for: In memory of Diwan Sir C. V. Rungacharlu
- Completed: 1884
- Owner: Mysore City Corporation

Technical details
- Floor count: 2

Design and construction
- Civil engineer: Sir K. Seshadri Iyer

The Rangacharlu Memorial Hall, commonly known as Mysore Town Hall and colloquially referred to simply as the Town Hall, is a Neoclassical-styled public building that was constructed in 1884 in memory of the 14th Diwan of Mysore Sir C. V. Rungacharlu. He was a Dewan (chief minister) of Mysore who served from 1881 to 1883. The stone-built hall is a prominent example of late-19th-century colonial architecture in the city. It occupies a central location opposite the Mysuru Clock Tower on Ashoka Road and was long a focal point for civic and cultural gatherings. The construction was sponsored by Maharaja Chamarajendra Wadiyar X. Rungacharlu's successor Diwan Sir K. Sheshadri Iyer was the building's chief engineer and planner. The hall’s Neoclassical façade, with its Corinthian columns and decorative pediments, reflects the influence of Western architectural styles introduced under the Wodeyar monarchy. Over time the building served both as municipal offices and as an auditorium for public events. In the late 20th and early 21st centuries it underwent periodic renovations, but after decades of use it suffered neglect. Recent reports (2022–2024) indicate that extensive restoration efforts have been stalled by administrative delays, and the hall remained closed to the public despite calls for its reopening.

== History ==
The Town Hall was commissioned by Maharaja Chamarajendra Wadiyar X in the mid-1880s as a memorial to his Dewan, Sir Chettipunyam Veeravalli Rangacharlu. Rangacharlu had been appointed Dewan in 1881 after the restoration of the Wadiyar dynasty and was noted for modernizing Mysore’s administration. He instituted the Prajapratinidhi Sabha (people’s representative assembly) in 1881 and was instrumental in fiscal reforms and development projects. After Rangacharlu’s death in 1883, the Maharaja determined to honor his service and laid a foundation stone for the new Town Hall on 1 April 1884, and the Maharaja inaugurated the completed building the following year. Upon completion in 1885, the building was officially named as C. V. Rangacharlu Memorial Hall (often shortened to Rangacharlu Hall). It is popularly called the Mysore Town Hall or simply, Town Hall.

The Town Hall served multiple civic functions in its early days. The ground floor housed municipal offices, while the upper floor contained the main auditorium and assembly hall. It was intended as a cultural venue: according to a 2024 civic leader's appeal. The hall soon became a focal point for public functions. Over the decades it hosted speeches, concerts, theatrical performances and official ceremonies. The hall's entrance steps were used by visiting dignitaries such as Prime Ministers Indira Gandhi and Rajiv Gandhi during public appearances.

After Indian independence and the formation of the modern Mysore state (later Karnataka) state, the building continued to be maintained by the Mysore City Corporation. It retained both its official name and function as a municipal auditorium. For much of its history the hall was used for civic exhibitions, cultural programs, and meetings of civic organizations. Its location in the heart of Mysuru near the Maharaja’s palace, kept it prominent in city life. By the early 2000s it was still referred to as the Town Hall of Mysore.

== Architecture ==
Rangacharlu Memorial Hall is a large two-storeyed stone edifice in a Western-classical style (often described as Neoclassical). The rectangular building’s design reflects British colonial-era tastes combined with local decorative motifs. The front (west) façade features a grand portico with four pairs of fluted Corinthian columns supporting a wide triangular pediment. The pediment’s tympanum is richly carved with Western-style arabesques, and centrally displays an ornate sculpture of the Hindu goddess Lakshmi flanked by a pair of elephants. Flanking the portico, the façade has several tall arched windows, each topped with a keystone molding. On either side of the central portico the hall’s façade is symmetrical, with decorative balconies and railings. The side elevations are likewise balanced and include balconies on the upper floor set behind paired cast-iron balustrades. The stone walls are buff-colored.

The plan of the hall is roughly rectangular. A broad flight of steps leads up to the main entrance portico. Inside, the upper level contains a large auditorium (assembly hall) occupying much of the floor area. This hall, used for gatherings and performances, is furnished with wooden seating and a raised stage at one end. Early accounts note that the auditorium was decorated with painted panels and artwork. The interior décor is relatively simple, consistent with late-19th-century civic halls. Ceilings on the main hall are high, and walls are plastered. The floors are either wood or hard finish. The adjacent ground floor rooms originally municipal offices have plain corrugated ceilings and tiled floors. On the exterior, the hall is set back slightly with a planted forecourt. At one time a small garden and fountain stood in front; 19th- and 20th-century photographs show walkways flanked by lawns and flowerbeds surrounding the hall. The building lies directly across from Mysuru’s Dodda Gadiyara (the big clock tower), and along Ashoka Road it forms the western edge of a core heritage zone in the city.

== Recent developments ==
The Town Hall is also a noted element of Mysuru's historic urban landscape. It stands near the Maharaja's Palace, the Clock Tower and other heritage sites, all of which were part of the planned city center. In recent times, tour guides list the Town Hall among Mysuru's architectural attractions. An article for Times of India travel called it a "majestic and imposing" stone edifice and noted that it now serves as a venue for public events and performances. Even on casual tours of the city, visitors are encouraged to view the hall's grand façade and take in the adjacent landscaped grounds.

The Town Hall has required periodic maintenance and restoration. After decades of wear, major renovation efforts were undertaken at various times. In April 2002 the Mysore City Corporation (MCC) announced a facelift for the hall's interiors at a cost of about ₹16 lakh, the seating, acoustics and decor of the main hall were refurbished. The 2002 renovation addressed structural cracks and updated facilities, aiming to make the hall more attractive to audiences. Despite such efforts, by the 2010s the building had again fallen into partial disrepair. In 2022 a Star of Mysore report warned that renovation works had stalled in legal disputes, leaving the century-old Town Hall deteriorating. It noted: "Renovation works worth crores of rupees are caught in legal wrangles," and that the hall had "joined the list of neglected heritage structures in Mysuru" due to delays. The article described cracks in walls, a leaking roof, termite damage to wooden beams and doors, and an untidy forecourt, all indicating that the building needed urgent repairs.

By late 2023, officials reported that the MCC had indeed spent a substantial sum (several crores) on restoration, with a special Town Hall committee overseeing the project. A 2024 news story said "several crores of rupees has been spent on renovation works of the Town Hall" and that a dedicated committee was formed for its maintenance. However, that same report stated the irony that after the municipal council's term ended, new administrators "ignored the Town Hall leaving the facility in disuse". As of mid-2025 the hall's restoration is still incomplete. The city corporation has periodically stated that repair work is "in progress," but visible progress has been limited. A small amount of interior painting and electrical rewiring has been done, but larger tasks (like fixing the roof, restoring the stage area, redoing seating and lighting) remain pending. In January 2024 a former Mayor urged authorities to expedite the renovation and reopen the hall for cultural events.

== See also ==
- List of Heritage Buildings in Mysore
