= Rajendra Vilas =

Palace-hotel in Mysore, India

Coordinates: 12.278538°N 76.671083°E

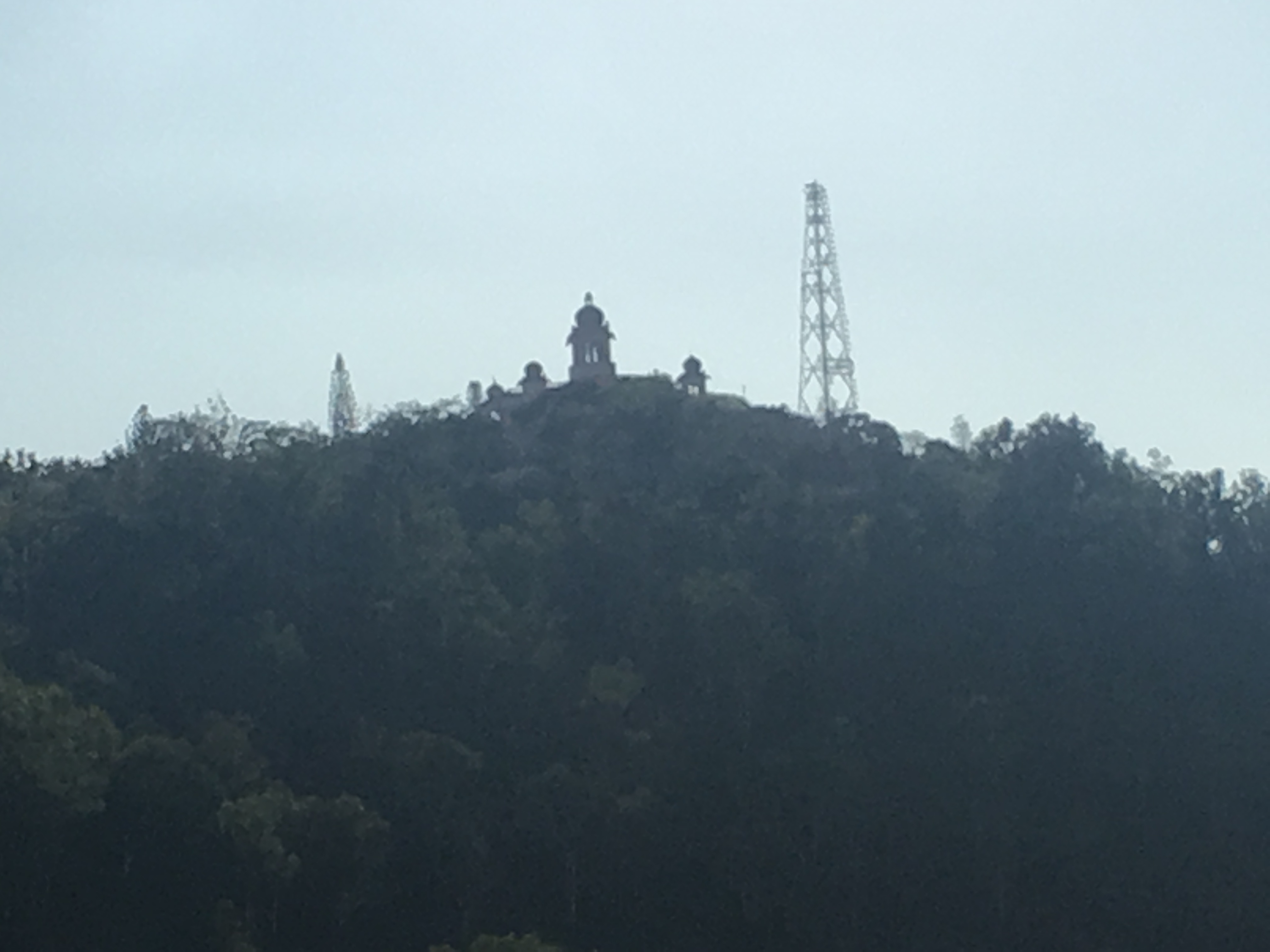
Rajendra Vilas from afar

The Rajendra Vilas is a palace-hotel atop Chamundi Hills in Mysore, Karnataka, India. It is now closed and in a state of neglect and can only be visited with prior permission.

== Description ==
The Rajendra Vilas palace is located on top of Chamundi Hills, at an elevation of nearly 300 metres. An older building existed at the location dating back to 1822, which was used as a summer palace by the Wodeyars of Mysore. Maharaja Krishnaraja Wodeyar IV was taught philosophy and English in this building. The conception of a much larger building was initiated in the 1920s. The palace was commissioned by Krishnaraja Wodeyar IV, and was completed in 1938–39. However, its plans were scaled down due to financial issues, and the building was not constructed as elaborately as planned.

After Indian independence, the state government of Karnataka considered the building as a heritage structure. However, it remained as a possession of Srikantha Datta Narasimharaja Wodeyar, the descendant of the Wodeyars, who converted it into a palace hotel. In the 1980s, it was closed due to labour problems, during which time the palace was not open to the public. In the early 2000s, renovation work began on the palace. In May 2004, it was announced that 'ITC welcome group' would take over management of the hotel. In the same year, Srikantadatta Narasimharaja Wodeyar contested elections in India for a Lok Sabha seat (Member of Parliament). Rajendra Vilas palace was included in the mandatory declaration of his immovable property assets, and declared to be worth Rs 60 million. In Sep 2006, during Dasara, a powerful beam of light that is visible up to 30 km was installed on the premises of Rajendra Vilas Palace atop the hills, to add to the festivities of the city. The renovation work was expected to be completed by December 2006, but it was not completed. Currently it remains as a partial ruin.

== Architectural features ==
It has four chhatris and a central dome. The chhatris are in Rajasthani style, with the other stylistic elements being distinctly Indo-Sarcenic. The central dome rests on a high neck in the style of Mysore Palace. The central tower is ribbed and showcases a lantern. A semi-circular verandah to the north provides a panoramic view of the city. The first floor opens to spacious terraces adjoining the chhatris. The palace-hotel has about 25 suites.

== See also ==
- List of Heritage Buildings in Mysore
