= Jayalakshmi Vilas =

Building in Karnataka, India

Coordinates: 12.3139265°N 76.6222273°E

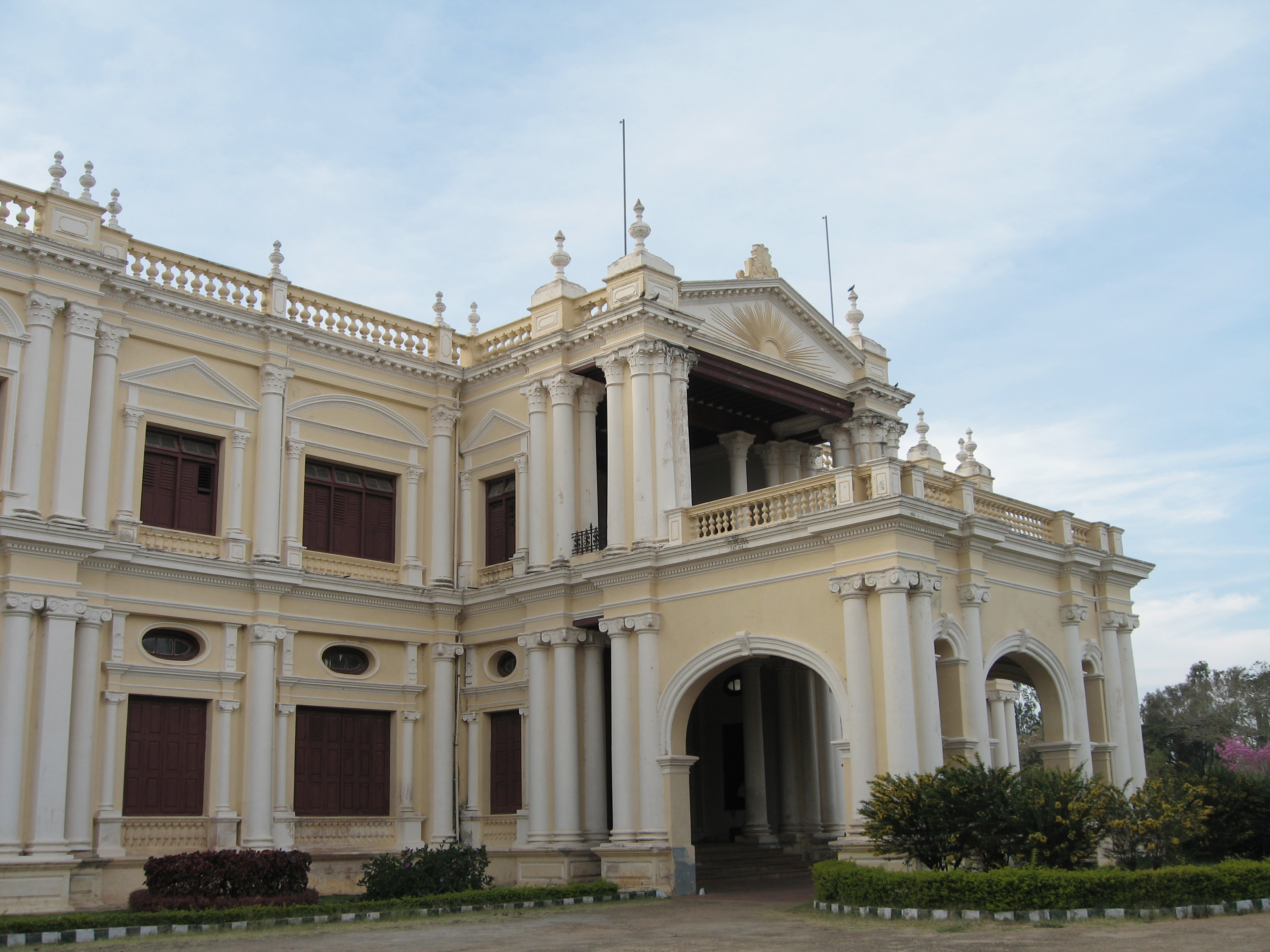
The Jayalakshmi Vilas Mansion

Jayalakshmi Vilas Mansion is a heritage building in Mysore.

== Description ==
Jayalakshmi Vilas Mansion is a building of architectural importance in Mysore city, Karnataka. It is located in the verdant surroundings of Manasa Gangothri, the campus of the University of Mysore. It rises on a hillock on the west side of Kukkarahalli Kere (lake). Jayalakshmi Vilas Mansion houses a museum of priceless collections of artifacts. The Karnataka government classifies it as a heritage structure.

The mansion was built in 1905, during the period of Krishnaraja Wodeyar IV, for princess Jayalakshmi Ammani, the eldest daughter of the Maharaja Chamaraja Wodeyar, at a cost of Rs. 7 lakhs. The location was intentionally chosen to be on top of a small hillock above Kukkarahalli Kere(lake). It was originally called 'the First Rajkumari Mansion'. The first princess Jayalakshmi, was married to Sirdar M. Kantharaj Urs in 1897, who later became the Dewan of Mysore. Kantharaj Urs had a house in the Fort of the Palace called "Gunamba House" after his mother. The mansion was built to be commensurate with their status of princess and dewan.

The mansion was gifted by the Maharaja of Mysore, Jayachamaraja Wodeyar, to the University of Mysore to establish a postgraduate center in its campus.

The building was in a state of neglect for a very long time. The building was restored at a cost of Rs. 1.17 crores with funds from the Infosys Foundation. Renovation began in 2002 and were completed in 2006. It was inaugurated by the governor of Karnataka on 16 January 2006 by switching on this new illumination system.

== Architectural features ==
The renovated mansion has 125 rooms, 300 windows, 287 exquisitely carved doors and it was spread across 6 acres (24,000 m^{2}). There are entrances on each side, different from each other. The entrance on the northern side has an extrusion on the stairs presumably to be used as alighting platform from cars and chariots. The mansion is chiefly built of brick and mortar, timber and iron. Stone was dispensed with considering the amount of delay it would have on construction if it were used. There are separated drainages for rain water and used water.

== See also ==
- List of Heritage Buildings in Mysore
