= Mysore =

City in Karnataka, India

Mysore Maisūru (Kannada)
- Metropolitan City
- Mysuru
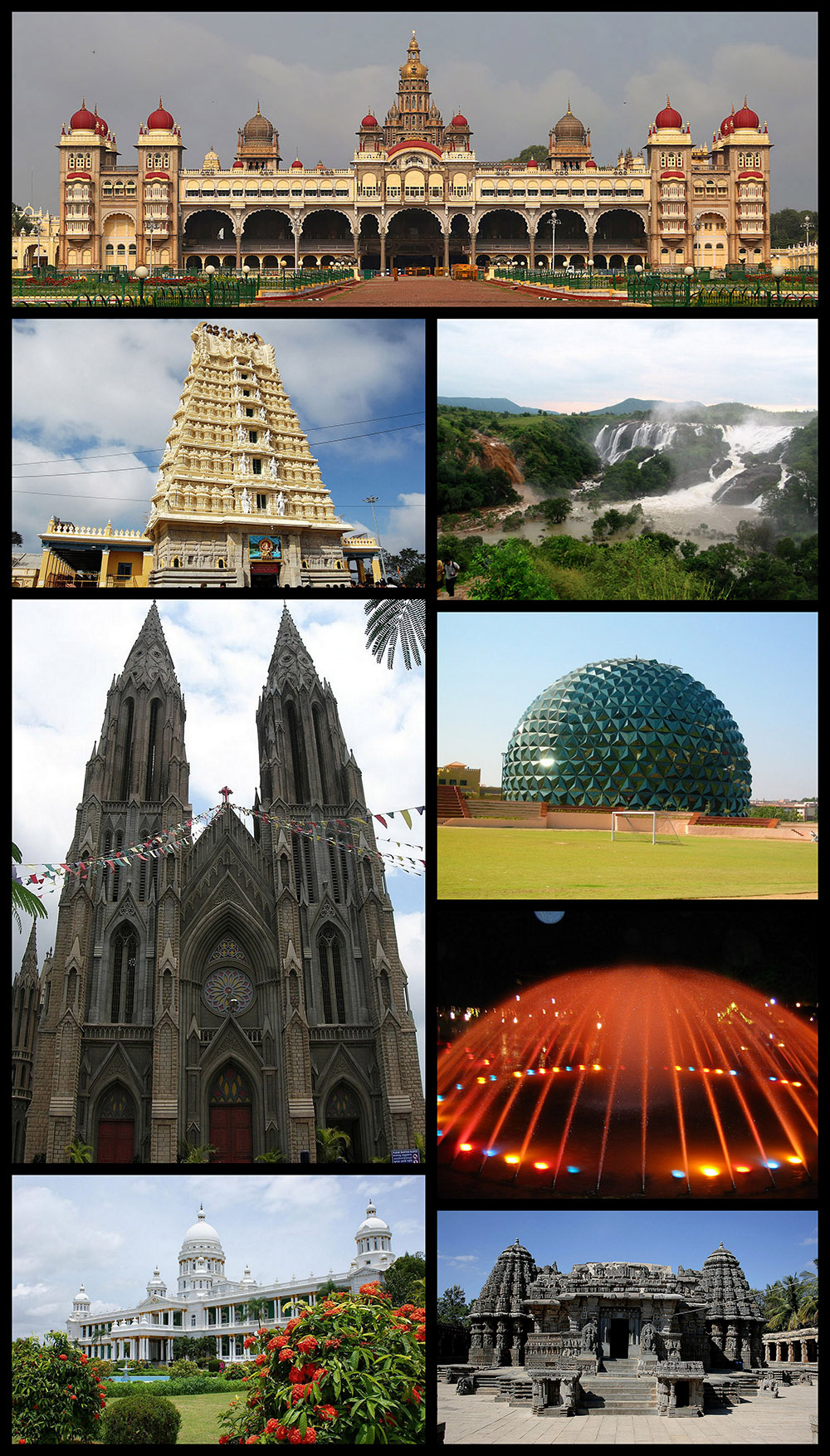
- Clockwise from top: Mysore Palace, Shivanasamudra Falls, Infosys Multiplex, Brindavan Gardens at Mandya, Chennakeshava Temple, Lalitha Mahal, St. Philomena's Cathedral and Chamundeshwari Temple.
- Nicknames: Heritage City, City of Palaces, The Cultural capital of Karnataka, Sandalwood City, City of Jasmine
- Mysuru in Karnataka
- Coordinates: 12°18′31″N 76°39′11″E
- Country: India
- State: Karnataka
- District: Mysore

Government
  - Type: Municipal Corporation
  - Body: Mysore City Corporation
  - Mayor: Shivakumar (BJP)
  - Deputy Mayor: G. Roopa

Area
  - Metropolitan City: 286 km^{2} (110 sq mi)
  - Rural: 703 km^{2} (271 sq mi)
  - Metro: 156 km^{2} (60 sq mi)
- Elevation: 770 m (2,530 ft)

Population (2011)
  - Metropolitan City: 920,550
  - Density: 3,220/km^{2} (8,340/sq mi)
  - Rural: 388,706
  - Metro: 1,060,120
- Demonym: Mysorean
- Time zone: UTC+05:30 (IST)
- Postal Index Number: 570 0xx
- Vehicle registration: KA-09, KA-55
- Official language: Kannada
- Telephone: 91-(0)821-XXX-XXXX
- UN/LOCODE: IN MYQ MYS
- Website: www.mysurucity.mrc.gov.in

Mysore (/maɪˈsɔːr/ my-SOR), officially Mysuru (Kannada: [ˈmaɪˈsuːɾu]), is a city in the southern Indian state of Karnataka. It is the administrative headquarters of Mysore district and Mysore division. As the traditional seat of the Wadiyar dynasty, the city functioned as the capital of the Kingdom of Mysore for almost six centuries (1399 to 1947). Known for its heritage structures, palaces (such as the famous Mysore Palace), and its culture, Mysore has been called the "City of Palaces", the "Heritage City", and the "Cultural capital of Karnataka". It is the second-most populous city in the state and one of the cleanest cities in India according to the Swachh Survekshan.

Mysore is situated at the foothills of the Chamundi Hills. At an altitude of 770 m (2,530 ft) above mean sea level, the city of Mysore is geographically located at 12° 18′ 26″ north latitude and 76° 38′ 59″ east longitude. It is about 140 km (87.0 mi) southwest of the state's capital, Bangalore, and spreads across an area of 156 km^{2} (60 sq mi) (city and neighbouring census towns). The population of the city combined with its neighbouring towns in its metropolitan area is about 1,288,000 in 2023.

Most of the city's development during modern times could be attributed to the maharajas of Mysore and the Wadiyar dynasty, who were patrons of art and culture. Hyder Ali and Tipu Sultan, when they were briefly in power in succession, also contributed significantly to the economic growth of the city and the kingdom by planting mulberry trees and silk in the region, and fighting four wars against the British. In present days, the Mysore City Corporation is responsible for the civic administration of the city.

During the annual Dasara festival, Mysore receives hundreds of thousands of tourists from around the world. The city is also the namesake to various art forms and culture, such as Mysore Dasara and Mysore painting; foods such as the sweet delicacy Mysore pak; brands such as Mysore Sandal Soap and Mysore Paints; and styles and cosmetics such as Mysore peta, a traditional silk turban, and the Mysore silk saris. Mysore is also known for betel leaves and its own special variety of jasmine flower fondly referred to as "Mysore mallige". Tourism is a lifeline industry for the city alongside the traditional industries. Mysore's intracity public transportation includes bus and intercity public transportation includes rail, bus, and air.

== Etymology ==
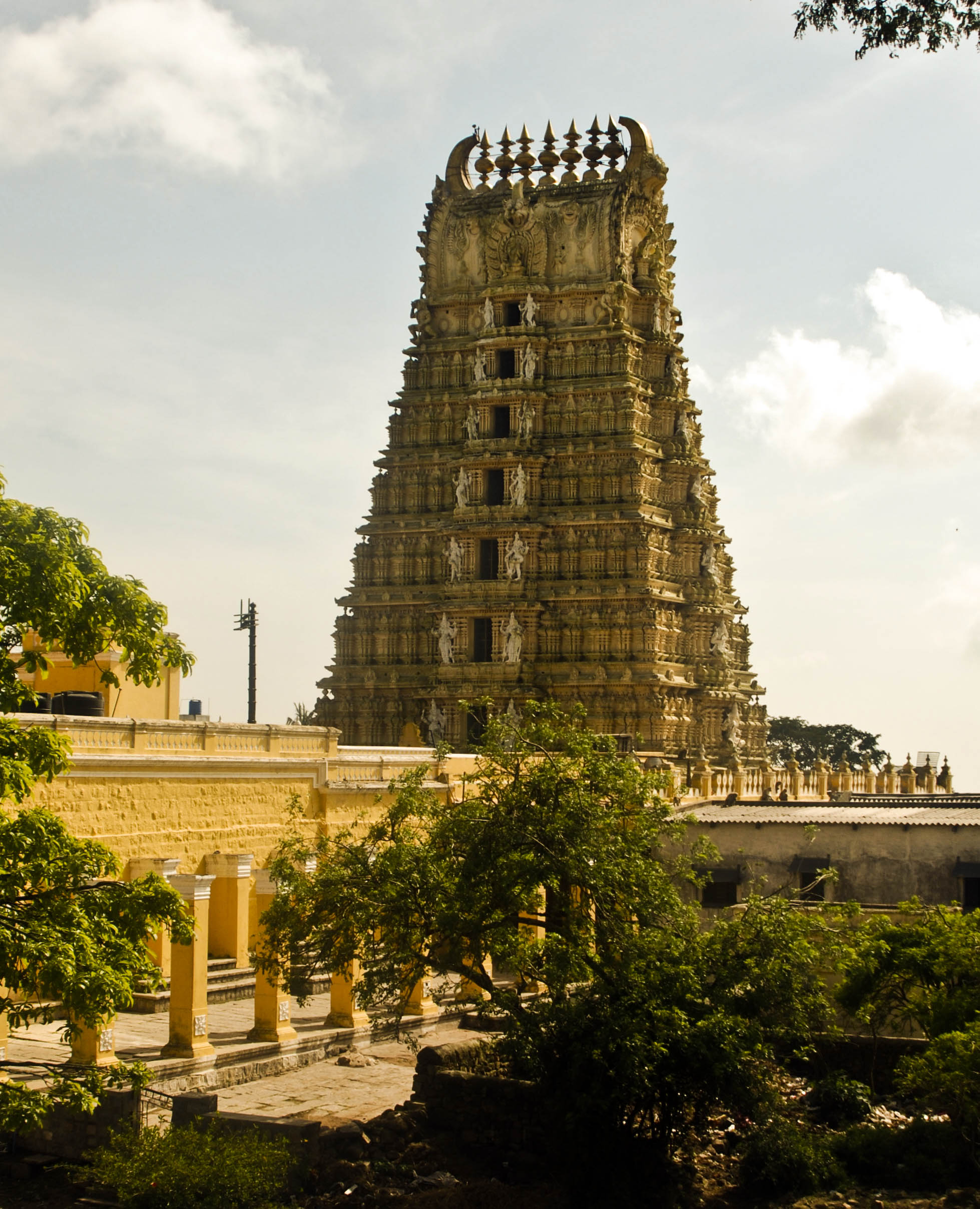
Chamundeshwari Temple atop the Chamundi Hill

The name Mysore is an anglicised form of Mahiṣūru, which means "the abode of Mahiṣa" in the vernacular Kannada. The common noun Mahiṣa, in Sanskrit, means buffalo; in this context, however, Mahiṣa refers to Mahishasura, a mythical demon who could assume the form of either a human or a buffalo, and who, according to Hindu mythology, ruled the ancient parts of Mysore Kingdom, known in Sanskrit as Mahiṣaka, centred at Mahiṣapura. He was killed by the goddess Chamundeshwari, whose temple is situated atop the Chamundi Hill, after whom it is named. Mahishamandala, Mahishapura, later became Mahisūru (a name which, even now, the royal family uses), and finally came to be rendered as Mysore by the British and Maisūru (Mysuru) in the vernacular Kannada language.

In December 2005, the Government of Karnataka announced its intention to change the English spelling of the city to Mysuru. This was approved by the Government of India in October 2014, and Mysore was officially renamed, along with twelve other cities, on 1 November 2014.

== History ==
The site where Mysore Palace now stands was occupied by a village named Puragere at the beginning of the 16th century. The Mahishūru Fort was constructed in 1524 by Chamaraja Wodeyar III (1513–1553), who passed on the dominion of Puragere to his son Chamaraja Wodeyar IV (1572–1576). Since the 16th century, the name of Mayashūru has commonly been used to denote the city. The Kingdom of Mysore, governed by the Wodeyar family, initially served as a vassal state of the Vijayanagara Empire. With the decline of that empire after the Battle of Talikota in 1565, the Mysore Kingdom gradually achieved independence, and by the time of King Narasaraja Wodeyar (1637), it had become a sovereign state. Seringapatam, near Mysore, the present-day Srirangapatna, was the capital of the kingdom beginning in 1610. The 17th century saw a steady expansion of its territory and, under Narasaraja Wodeyar I and Chikka Devaraja Wodeyar, the kingdom annexed large areas of what is now southern Karnataka and parts of Tamil Nadu, to become a powerful state in the southern Deccan.

The kingdom reached the height of its military power and dominion in the latter half of the 18th century, under the de facto rulers Hyder Ali and his son Tipu Sultan. The latter demolished parts of Mysore to remove legacies of the Wodeyar dynasty. During this time, the kingdom of Mysore came into conflict with the Marathas, the British, and the Nizam of Hyderabad, leading to the four Anglo-Mysore wars, success in the first two of which was followed by defeat in the third and fourth. After Tipu Sultan's death in the Fourth Anglo-Mysore War in 1799, the capital of the kingdom was moved back to Mysore from Seringapatam, and the kingdom was distributed by the British to their allies of the Fourth Anglo-Mysore War. Part of the kingdom was annexed into the Madras Presidency, another to the Nizam of Hyderabad. The landlocked interior of the defeated kingdom of Mysore was turned into a princely state under the suzerainty of the British Crown, with the five-year-old Wodeyar Krishnaraja III as titular ruler and with Purnaiah, who had served under Tipu, as chief minister or diwan and Lt. Col. Barry Close as Resident. The British took control of Mysore's foreign policy and insisted on an annual tribute for maintaining a standing British army at Mysore. Purnaiah is credited with improving Mysore's public works. In 1831, claiming there was maladministration, the British took direct control of the princely state. For the next fifty years, the kingdom of Mysore was under the direct rule of British Commissioners, and in 1831 the city of Mysore lost its status as the administrative centre, when the British Commissioner moved the capital to Bangalore.

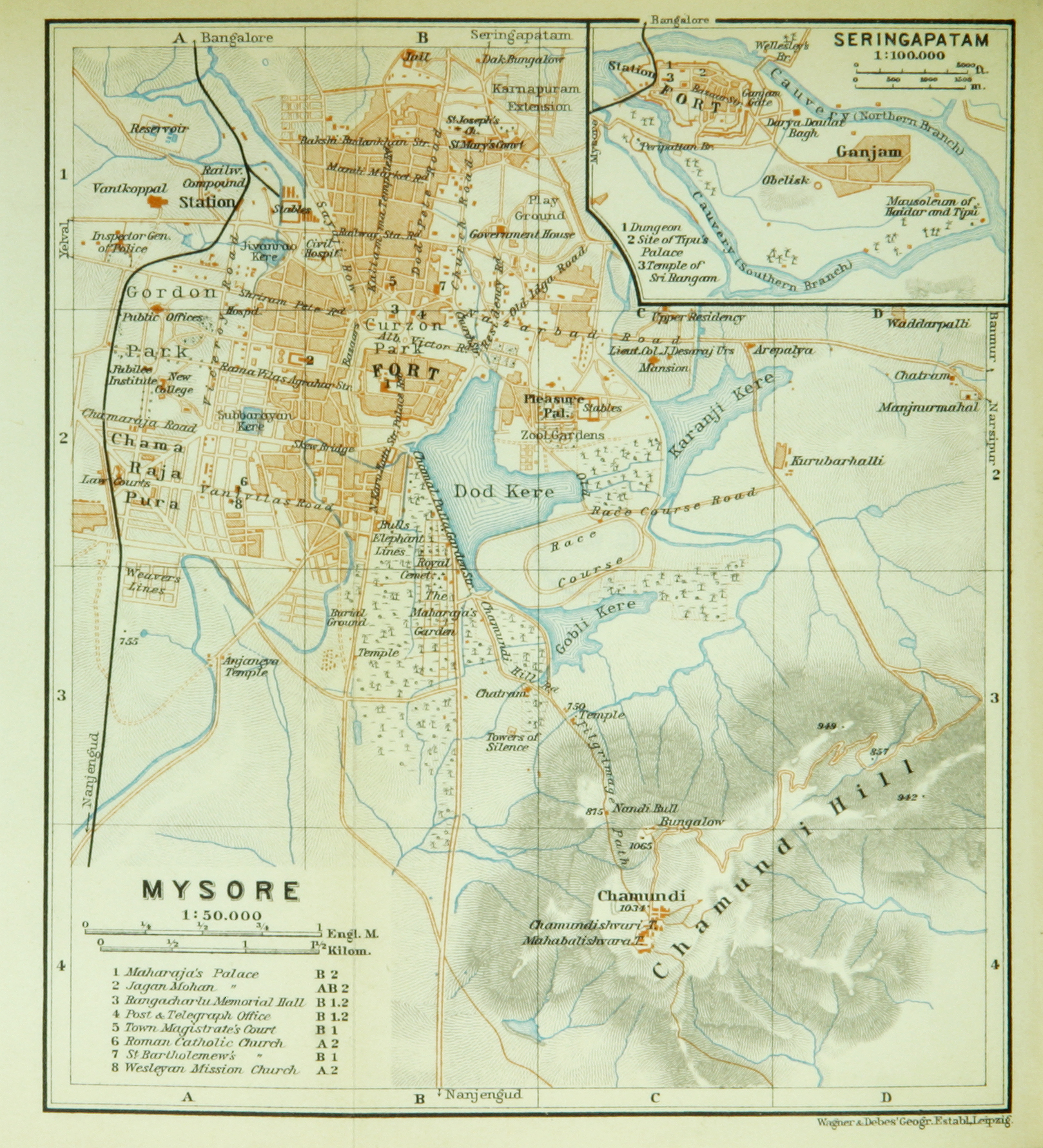
Map of Mysore and nearby Srirangapatna, c. 1914

In 1876–77, towards the end of the period of direct British rule, Mysore suffered from the Great Famine of 1876–1878, in which nearly a fifth of the population died. In 1881, Maharaja Chamaraja Wadiyar X was given control of Mysore, in a process called rendition, but with a resident British officer and a diwan to handle the Maharaja's administration, and the city of Mysore regained its status as the capital. The Mysore municipality was established in 1888 and the city was divided into eight wards. In 1897 an outbreak of bubonic plague killed nearly half of the population of the city. With the establishment of the City Improvement Trust Board (CITB) in 1903, Mysore became one of the first cities in Asia to undertake planned urban development. Public demonstrations and meetings were held there during the Quit India movement and other phases of the Indian independence movement.

Until the independence of British India (which did not include Mysore) in 1947, Mysore remained a Princely State within the British Indian Empire, with the Wodeyars continuing their rule. After Indian Independence, Mysore city remained as part of the Mysore State, now known as Karnataka. Jayachamarajendra Wodeyar, then king of Mysore, was allowed to retain his titles and was nominated as the Rajapramukh (appointed governor) of the state with a £20,000 payment. He died in September 1974 and was cremated in Mysore.

Over the years, Mysore became well known as a centre for tourism; the city remained largely peaceful, except for occasional riots related to the Kaveri River Water Dispute. Among the events that took place in Mysore and made national headlines were a fire at a television studio that claimed 62 lives in 1989, and the sudden deaths of many animals at the Mysore Zoo.

== Geography ==
=== Area and extent ===
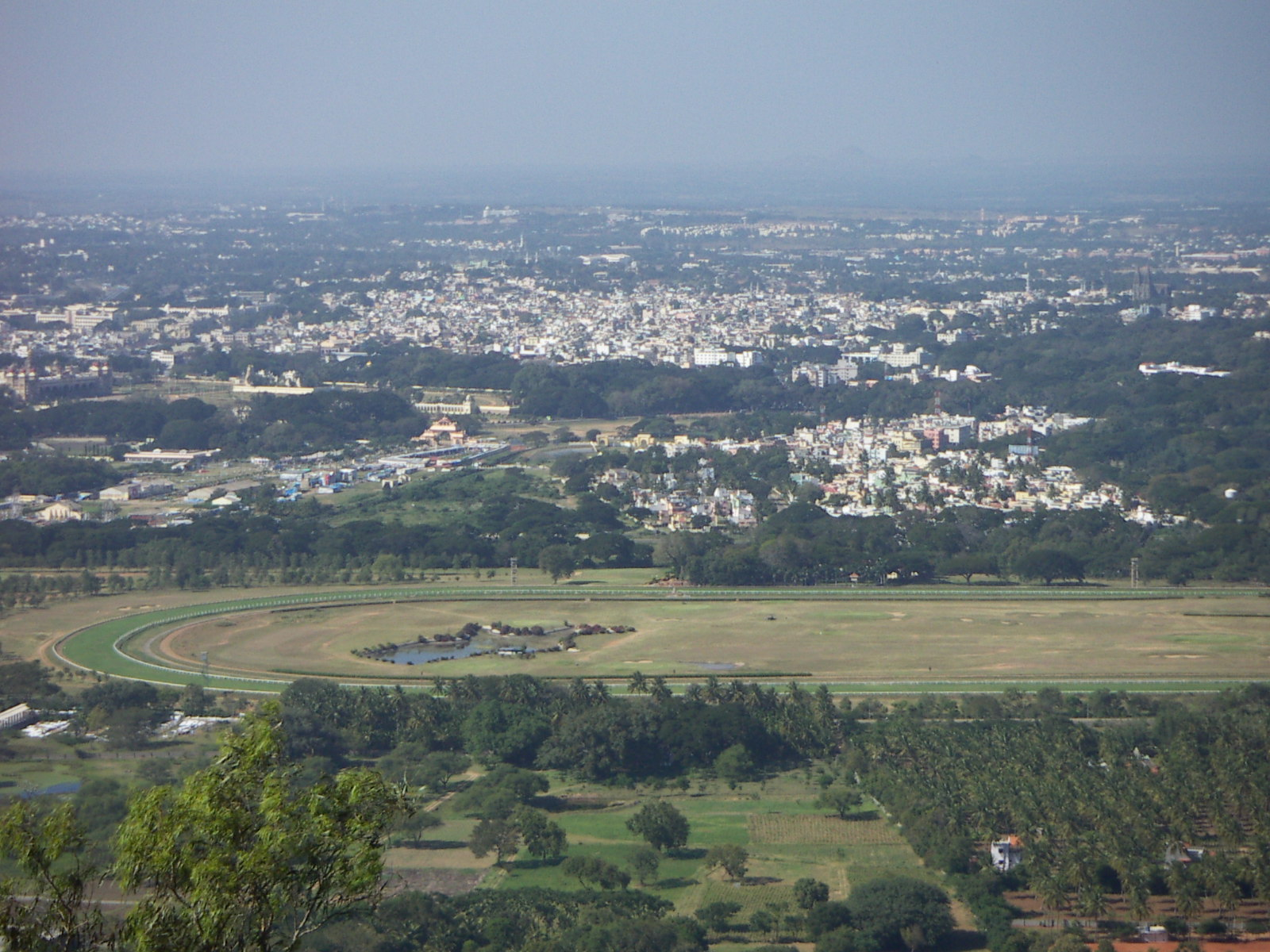
View of the city from Chamundi Hills

Mysore is located at 12.30°N 74.65°E and has an average altitude of 770 metres (2,526 ft). It is spread across an area of 286.05 km^{2} (110 sq mi) at the base of the Chamundi Hills in the southern region of Karnataka. Mysore is the southernmost city of Karnataka and is a neighbouring city of the states of Kerala and Tamil Nadu in the south, flanked by the state cities Madikeri, Chamarajanagara, and Mandya. People in and around Mysore extensively use Kannada as a medium of language. Mysore has several lakes, such as the Kukkarahalli, the Karanji, and the Lingambudhi lakes. Mysore has The Biggest 'Walk-Through Aviary' called Karanji Lake in India. In 2001, total land area usage in Mysore city was 39.9% residential, 16.1% roads, 13.74% parks and open spaces, 13.48% industrial, 8.96% public property, 3.02% commercial, 2.27% agriculture and 2.02 water. The city is located between two rivers: the Kaveri River that flows through the north of the city and the Kabini River, a tributary of the Kaveri, that lies to the south.

=== Climate ===
Mysore has a tropical savanna climate (Aw) bordering on a hot semi-arid climate (BSh) under the Köppen climate classification. The main seasons are Summer from March to May, the monsoon season from June to October and winter from November to February. The highest temperature recorded in Mysore was 39.9 °C (104 °F) on 25 April 2016, and the lowest was 7.7 °C (46 °F) on 16 January 2012. In the early hours of 20 December 2025, Mysore city recorded its lowest temperature in December at 8.4 °C. The city has an average annual rainfall is 798.6 mm (31.44 in). As per Karnataka State Natural Disaster Monitoring Centre, Mysore received 1,358 mm (53.5 in) rainfall in 2022.

Climate data for Mysore (1991–2020, extremes 1901–2020)
Month	Jan	Feb	Mar	Apr	May	Jun	Jul	Aug	Sep	Oct	Nov	Dec	Year
Record high °C (°F)	33.9 (93.0)	36.1 (97.0)	38.5 (101.3)	39.9 (103.8)	39.0 (102.2)	37.4 (99.3)	35.8 (96.4)	33.9 (93.0)	34.2 (93.6)	35.0 (95.0)	32.8 (91.0)	32.1 (89.8)	39.9 (103.8)
Mean daily maximum °C (°F)	29.3 (84.7)	31.4 (88.5)	33.6 (92.5)	34.3 (93.7)	33.4 (92.1)	30.0 (86.0)	28.7 (83.7)	28.6 (83.5)	29.5 (85.1)	29.4 (84.9)	28.7 (83.7)	28.3 (82.9)	30.4 (86.7)
Mean daily minimum °C (°F)	16.3 (61.3)	17.3 (63.1)	19.4 (66.9)	21.0 (69.8)	21.2 (70.2)	20.4 (68.7)	19.9 (67.8)	19.8 (67.6)	19.7 (67.5)	19.7 (67.5)	18.7 (65.7)	16.9 (62.4)	19.2 (66.6)
Record low °C (°F)	7.7 (45.9)	8.6 (47.5)	10.4 (50.7)	14.9 (58.8)	15.6 (60.1)	12.6 (54.7)	15.8 (60.4)	16.5 (61.7)	13.4 (56.1)	11.2 (52.2)	9.6 (49.3)	8.7 (47.7)	7.7 (45.9)
Average rainfall mm (inches)	1.1 (0.04)	2.5 (0.10)	12.6 (0.50)	84.5 (3.33)	127.8 (5.03)	76.6 (3.02)	84.2 (3.31)	96.9 (3.81)	102.3 (4.03)	162.7 (6.41)	67.5 (2.66)	12.9 (0.51)	831.5 (32.74)
Average rainy days	0.2	0.2	1.1	4.9	7.3	6.0	8.1	7.9	6.9	8.5	4.3	0.9	56.2
Average relative humidity (%) (at 17:30 IST)	50	49	45	50	62	73	76	75	72	72	70	61	63
Average ultraviolet index	10	12	12	12	12	12	12	12	12	12	10	10	12
Source 1: India Meteorological Department
Source 2: Weather Atlas

== Demographics ==
Historical population
Year	Pop.	±%
1891	74,648	—
1901	68,111	−8.8%
1911	71,306	+4.7%
1921	83,951	+17.7%
1931	107,142	+27.6%
1941	150,540	+40.5%
1951	244,323	+62.3%
1961	253,865	+3.9%
1971	355,685	+40.1%
1981	479,081	+34.7%
1991	653,345	+36.4%
2001	799,228	+22.3%
2011	920,550	+15.2%
Source: Census of India

As per the 2011 Census, Mysore city had an estimated population of 920,550 consisting of 461,042 males and 459,508 females, making it the third most populous city in Karnataka Mysore urban agglomeration is the second largest urban agglomeration in the state and is home to 1,060,120 people, consisting of 497,132 males and 493,762 females. According to 2011 census, Mysore was the largest non-metropolitan city in India and had the highest basic infrastructure index of 2.846. Mysore was estimated to have crossed 1 million in 2017 making it a metropolitan city. For the year 2022, the projected population of Mysuru Metropolitan Area, which includes Mysore City Corporation, Hootagalli City Municipal Council, and Bogadi, Srirampura, Rammanahalli and Kadakola Town Panchayats is 1,261,000, as per the United Nations' World Urbanization Prospects - 2018.

Religions in Mysore city (2011)
Religion	Percent
Hinduism	73.65%
Islam	21.92%
Christianity	2.71%
Jainism	1.13%
Other or not stated	0.59%

The gender ratio of Mysore is 1,000 females to every 1,000 males and the population density is 6,910.5 per square kilometre (17,898/sq mi). According to the census of 2001, 73.65% of the city population are Hindus, 21.92% are Muslims, 2.71% are Christians, 1.13% are Jains and the remainder belong to other religions. The population exceeded 100,000 in the census of 1931 and grew by 20.5 per cent in the decade 1991–2001. As of 2011, the literacy rate of the city is 86.84 per cent, which is higher than the state's average of 75.6 per cent.

Languages of Mysore (2011)
Religion	Percent
Kannada	60.51%
Urdu	21.2%
Telugu	4.82%
Tamil	4.58%
Others	8.89%

Kannada is the most widely spoken language in the city. Approximately 19% of the population live below the poverty line, and 9% live in slums. According to the 2001 census, 35.75% of the population in the urban areas of Karnataka are workers, but only 33.3% of the population of Mysore are. Members of Scheduled castes and scheduled tribes constitute 15.1% of the population. According to the National Crime Records Bureau of India, the number of cognisable crime incidents reported in Mysore during 2010 was 3,407 (second in the state, after Bangalore's 32,188), increasing from 3,183 incidents reported in 2009.

The residents of the city are known as Mysoreans in English and Mysoorinavaru in Kannada. The dispute between Karnataka and Tamil Nadu over the sharing of Kaveri river water often leads to minor altercations and demonstrations in the city. Growth in the information technology industry in Mysore has led to a change in the city's demographic profile; likely strains on the infrastructure and haphazard growth of the city resulting from the demographic change have been a cause of concern for some of its citizens.

== Administration and utilities ==
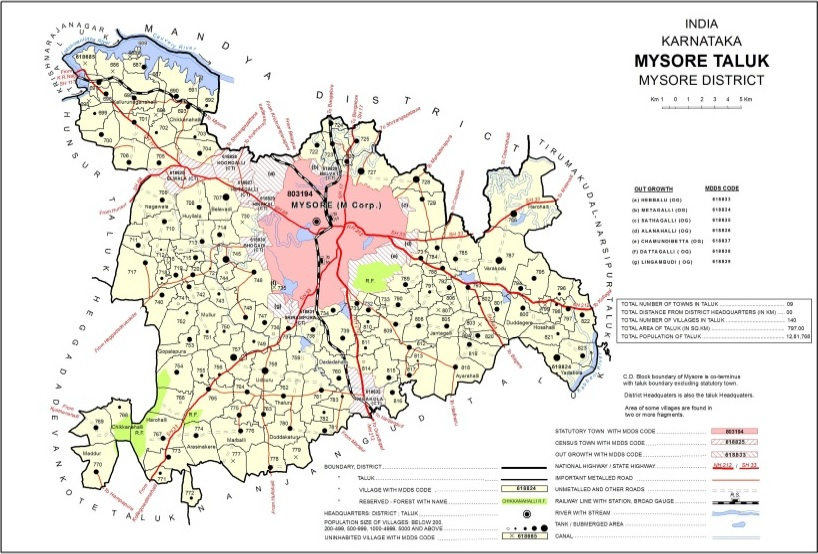
Map of Mysore taluk (2011)

The civic administration of the city is managed by the Mysore City Corporation, which was established as a municipality in 1888 and converted into a corporation in 1977. Overseeing engineering works, health, sanitation, water supply, administration and taxation, the corporation is headed by a Mayor, who is assisted by commissioners and council members. The city is divided into 65 wards and the council members (also known as corporators) are elected by the citizens of Mysore every five years. The council members, in turn, elect the mayor. The annual budget of the corporation for the year 2011–2012 was ₹4.27 billion (equivalent to ₹9.6 billion or US$100 million in 2026). Among 63 cities covered under the Jawaharlal Nehru National Urban Renewal Mission, Mysore City Corporation was adjudged the second-best city municipal corporation and was given the "Nagara Ratna" award in 2011. The present MCC Commissioner is Shri.Tanveer Asif.

Urban growth and expansion is managed by the Mysore Urban Development Authority (MUDA), which is headed by a commissioner. Its activities include developing new layouts and roads, town planning and land acquisition. One of the major projects undertaken by MUDA is the creation of an Outer Ring Road to ease traffic congestion. Citizens of Mysore have criticised MUDA for its inability to prevent land mafias and ensure lawful distribution of housing lands among city residents. The Chamundeshwari Electricity Supply Corporation is responsible for electric supply to the city.

The Mysuru City Police, headed by a Commissioner of Police (CP), is responsible for policing and law enforcement in the city. At present, the Commissionerate oversees 18 police stations, including a Women's Police Station, five traffic subdivisions, and one Cyber, Economic and Narcotics (CEN) Police Station. Karnataka Fire and Emergency Services, provide fire and emergency services in the city.

Drinking water for Mysore is sourced from the Kaveri and Kabini rivers. The city got its first piped water supply when the Belagola project was commissioned in 1896. As of 2011, Mysore gets 193,000 cubic metres (42.5 million imperial gallons) of water per day. Mysore sometimes faces water crises, mainly during the summer months (March–June) and in years of low rainfall. The city has had an underground drainage system since 1904. The entire sewage from the city drains into four valleys: Kesare, Malalavadi, Dalavai and Belavatha. In an exercise carried out by the Urban Development Ministry under the national urban sanitation policy, Mysore was rated the second cleanest city in India in 2010 and the cleanest in Karnataka. In Mysore, the Jal Diwali Campaign empowered SHGs to collectively address water conservation challenges. 90 women heads of 30 women's Self-Help Groups (SHGs) in Mysuru city were introduced to the nitty-gritty of water supply, by a visit to Mysuru City Corporation's (MCC) Water Treatment Plant at Hongalli near Krishna Raja Sagar (KRS) Dam in Mandya district.

The citizens of Mysore elect five representatives to the Legislative assembly of Karnataka through the constituencies of Chamaraja, Krishnaraja, Narasimharaja, Hunsur and Chamundeshwari. Mysore city, being part of the larger Mysore Lok Sabha constituency, also elects one member to the Lok Sabha, the lower house of the Indian Parliament. The politics in the city is dominated by three political parties: the Indian National Congress (INC), the Bharatiya Janata Party (BJP), and the Janata Dal (Secular) (JDS).

== Economy ==
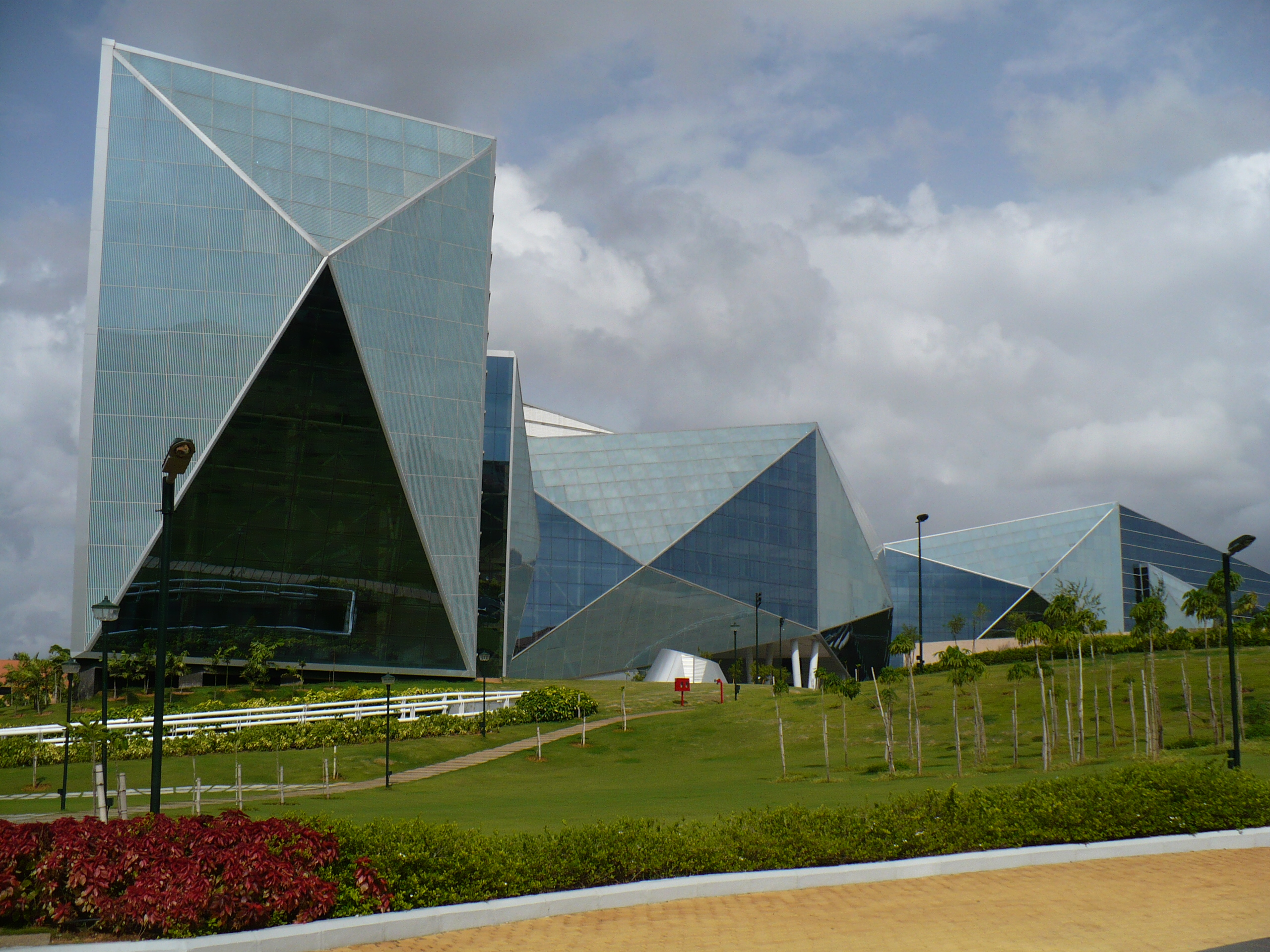
Infosys office at Hebbal, Mysore

Tourism and IT are the major industries in Mysore. The city attracted about 3.15 million tourists in 2010. Mysore has traditionally been home to industries such as weaving, sandalwood carving, bronze work and the production of lime and salt. It has many big IT companies like Infosys and Wipro. The planned industrial growth of the city and the state was first envisaged at the Mysore economic conference in 1911. This led to the establishment of industries such as the Mysore Sandalwood Oil Factory in 1917 and the Sri Krishnarajendra Mills in 1920. Mysore has emerged as an industrial hub in Karnataka next to Bangalore. Mysore is part of the Bidar-Mysore Industrial Corridor. Major drivers of the economy are tourism, finance, manufacturing and industry which includes chemicals, petrochemicals, machinery, automobile, engineering, textiles and food processing sectors. A new industrial corridor plan is underway between Mysore and Bangalore.

For the industrial development of the city, the Karnataka Industrial Areas Development Board (KIADB) has established four industrial areas in and around Mysore, in the Belagola, Belawadi, Hebbal and Hootagalli areas. One of the major industrial areas near Mysore is Nanjangud which will be a satellite town to Mysore. Nanjangud industrial area hosts a number of industries like AT&S India Pvt Ltd, Nestle India ltd, Reid and Taylor, Jubiliant, TVS, and Asian Paints. Nanjangud Industrial area also boasts being 2nd highest VAT / Sales Taxpayer which is more than ₹4 billion (US$42 million) after Peenya which is in state capital Bangalore. JK Tyre has its manufacturing facility in Mysore. The city has emerged as a hub of automobile industries in Karnataka.

The major software companies in Mysore are Infosys, ArisGlobal, Larsen & Toubro Infotech, Excelsoft Technologies and Triveni Engineering. The growth of the information technology industry in the first decade of the 21st century has resulted in the city emerging as the second largest software exporter in Karnataka (as of), next to Bangalore. Mysore also has many shopping malls, including the Mall of Mysore which is one of the largest malls in India and Karnataka. Retail is also a major part of the economy in Mysore.

Mysore also hosts many central government organisations like CFTRI, DFRL, CIPET, BEML, RMP (Rare Material Project), RBI Note printing Press and RBI Paper Printing Press.

== Culture ==
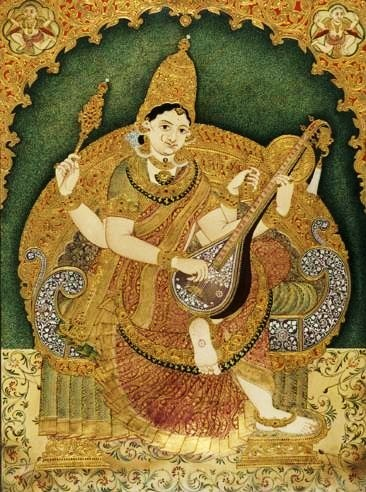
Mysore painting depicting Hindu goddess Saraswati

Referred to as the cultural capital of Karnataka, Mysore is well known for the festivities that take place during the period of Dasara; the state festival of Karnataka. The Dasara festivities, which are celebrated over a ten-day period, were first introduced by King Raja Wodeyar I in 1610. On the ninth day of Dasara, called Mahanavami, the royal sword is worshipped and is taken on a procession of decorated elephants, camels and horses. On the tenth day, called Vijayadashami, the traditional Dasara procession (locally known as Jumboo Savari) is held on the streets of Mysore which usually falls in the month of September or October. The idol of the goddess Chamundeshwari is placed on a golden mantapa on the back of a decorated elephant and taken on a procession, accompanied by tabla, dance groups, music bands, decorated elephants, horses and camels. The procession starts from the Mysore Palace and culminates at a place called Bannimantapa, where the banni tree (Prosopis spicigera) is worshipped. The Dasara festivities culminate on the night of Vijayadashami with a torchlight parade, known locally as Panjina Kavayatthu.

Mysore is called the City of Palaces because of several ornate examples in the city. Among the most notable are Amba Vilas, popularly known as Mysore Palace; Jaganmohana Palace, which also serves as an art gallery; Rajendra Vilas, also known as the summer palace; Lalitha Mahal, which has been converted into a hotel; and Jayalakshmi Vilas. The palace of Mysore burned down in 1897, and the present structure was built on the same site. Amba Vilas palace exhibits an Indo-Saracenic style of architecture on the outside, but a distinctly Hoysala style in the interior. Even though the Government of Karnataka maintains the Mysore palace, a small portion has been allocated for the erstwhile royal family to live in. The Jayalakshmi Vilas Mansion was constructed by Sri Chamaraja Wodeyar for his daughter Jayalakshammanni. It is now a museum dedicated to folk culture and artefacts of the royal family.

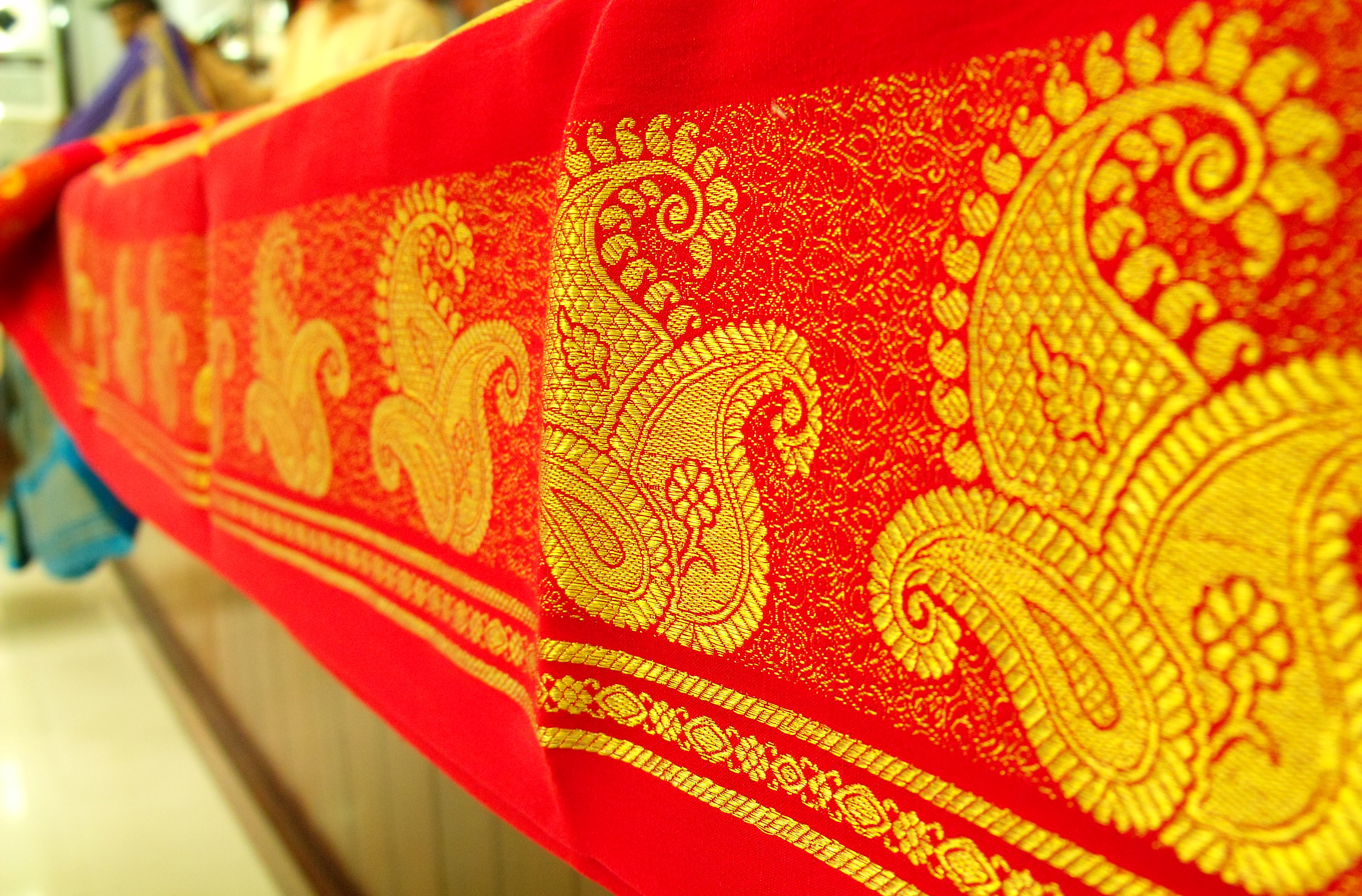
Mysore silk sari

The Mysore painting style is an offshoot of the Vijayanagar school of painting, and King Raja Wodeyar (1578–1617 CE) is credited with having been its patron. The distinctive feature of these paintings is the gesso work, to which gold foil is applied. Mysore is known for rosewood inlay work; around 4,000 craftsmen were involved in this art in 2002. The city lends its name to the Mysore silk sari, a women's garment made with pure silk and gold zari (thread). Mysore Peta, the traditional indigenous turban worn by the erstwhile rulers of Mysore, is worn by men in some traditional ceremonies. A notable local dessert that traces its history to the kitchen in the Mysore palace is Mysore pak.

Mysore is the location of the International Ganjifa Research Centre, which researches the ancient card game Ganjifa and the art associated with it. The Chamarajendra Academy of Visual Arts (CAVA) offers education in visual art forms such as painting, graphics, sculpture, applied art, photography, photojournalism and art history. The Rangayana repertory company performs plays and offers certificate courses in subjects related to theatre. Kannada writers Kuvempu, Gopalakrishna Adiga and U. R. Ananthamurthy were educated in Mysore and served as professors at the Mysore University. R. K. Narayan, a popular English-language novelist and creator of the fictional town of Malgudi, and his cartoonist brother R. K. Laxman spent much of their life in Mysore.

== Tourism ==
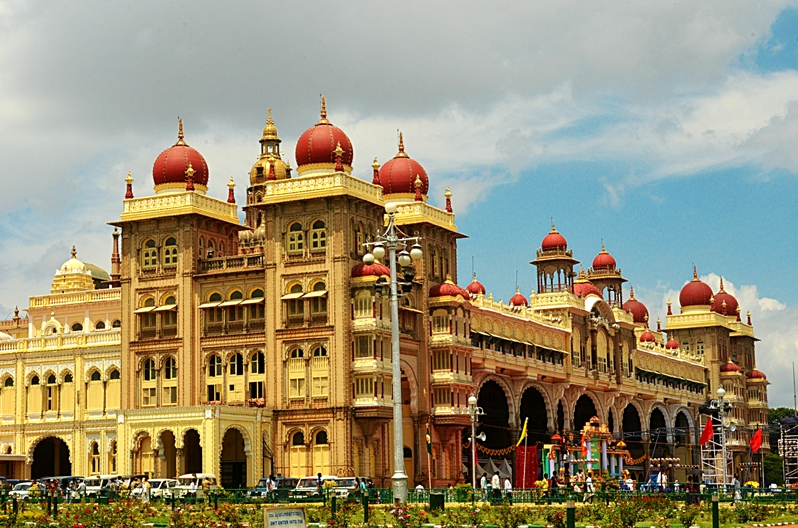
Mysore Palace

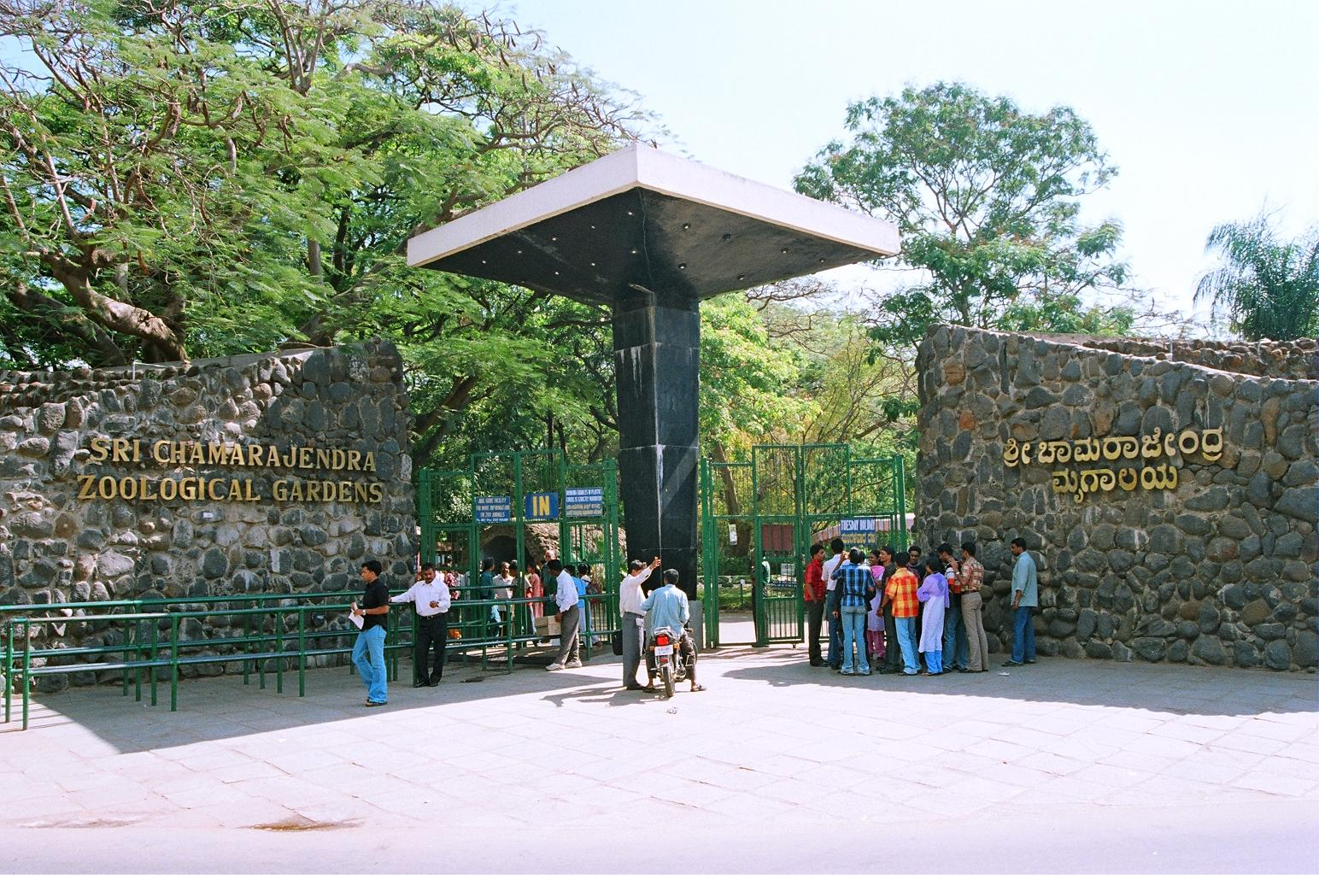
Mysore Zoo

Mysore is a major tourist destination in its own right and serves as a base for other tourist attractions in the vicinity. The city receives many tourists during the ten-day Dasara festival. One of the most visited monuments in India, the Amba Vilas Palace, or Mysore Palace, is the centre of the Dasara festivities. The Jaganmohana Palace, The Sand Sculpture Museum the Jayalakshmi Vilas and the Lalitha Mahal are other palaces in the city. Chamundeshwari Temple, atop the Chamundi Hills, and St. Philomena's Church, Wesley's Cathedral, Karanji lake are notable religious places in Mysore.

The Mysore Zoo, established in 1892, the Karanji, Kukkarahalli and the Blue Lagoon Lake are popular recreational destinations. Blue Lagoon is a lake with a mini-island located behind the KrishnaRajaSagar (KRS) water dam, from which it is mesmerising to watch the sunset and sunrise. Mysore has the Regional Museum of Natural History, the Folk Lore Museum, the Railway Museum and the Oriental Research Institute. The city is a centre for yoga-related health tourism that attracts domestic and foreign visitors, particularly those who, for years, came to study with the late Ashtanga vinyasa yoga guru K. Pattabhi Jois. Other recreational attractions in Mysore include GRS Snow Park, an indoor snow-themed entertainment facility offering artificial snow activities and experiences for visitors.

A short distance from Mysore city is the neighbouring Mandya District's Krishnarajasagar Dam and the adjoining Brindavan Gardens, where a musical fountain show is held every evening. Places of historic importance close to Mysore are Mandya District's Ranganathaswamy Temple, Srirangapatna. And other historical places are Somanathapura and Talakad. B R Hills, Himavad Gopalaswamy Betta hill and the hill stations of Ooty, Sultan Bathery and Madikeri are close to Mysore. Popular destinations for wildlife enthusiasts near Mysore include the Nagarahole National Park, the wildlife sanctuaries at Melkote, Mandya and B R Hills and the bird sanctuaries at Ranganathittu, Mandya and Kokrebellur, Mandya. Bandipur National Park and Mudumalai National Park in Tamil Nadu, which are sanctuaries for gaur, chital, elephants, tigers, leopards and other threatened species, lie between 60 and 100 kilometres (37 and 62 mi) to the south. Other tourist spots near Mysore include the religious locations of Nanjanagud and Bylakuppe and the waterfalls at neighbouring districts of Mandya's Shivanasamudra. Known for their royal grandeur, the annual Mysore Dasara celebrations are a major tourist attraction and attract large number of tourists every year.

== Transport ==
=== Road ===
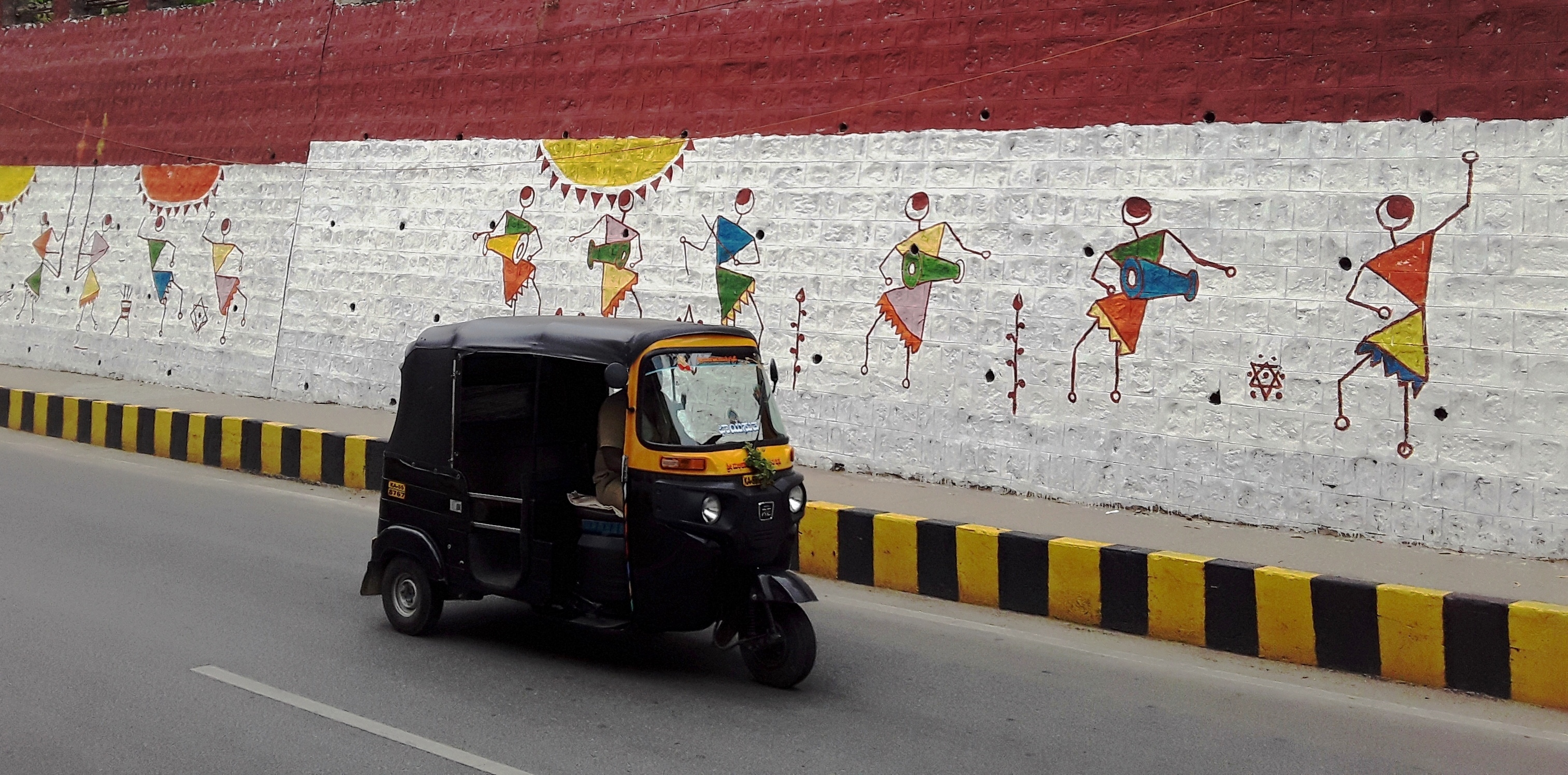
Warli paintings on a Mysore road

Mysore is connected by National Highway 212 (India) to the state border town of Gundlupet, where the road forks into the states of Kerala and Tamil Nadu. State Highway 17, which connects Mysore to Bangalore, was upgraded to a four-lane highway in 2006, reducing travel time between the two cities. A project was planned in 1994 to construct a new expressway to connect Bangalore and Mysore. After numerous legal hurdles, it remains unfinished as of 2012. State Highway 33 and National Highway 275 which connect Mysore to H D Kote and Mangalore respectively. The Karnataka State Road Transport Corporation (KSRTC) and other private agencies operate buses both within the city and between cities. A new division of KSRTC called Mysore City Transport Corporation (MCTC) has been proposed. Within the city, buses are cheap and popular means of transport, auto-rickshaws are also available and tongas (horse-drawn carriages) are popular with tourists. Mysore also has a 42.5-kilometre (26.4 mi) long ring road that is being upgraded to six lanes by the MUDA. Mysore has implemented Intelligent Transport System (ITS) to manage its city buses and ferrying commuters.

RTO code of Mysore West is KA09 and Mysore East is KA55.

A public bicycle-sharing system, Trin Trin, funded partially by the United Nations operates in the city. It is the first public bike-sharing system in India, and was started with the key objective of encouraging commuters to use bicycle instead of motorised modes of transport.

=== Rail ===
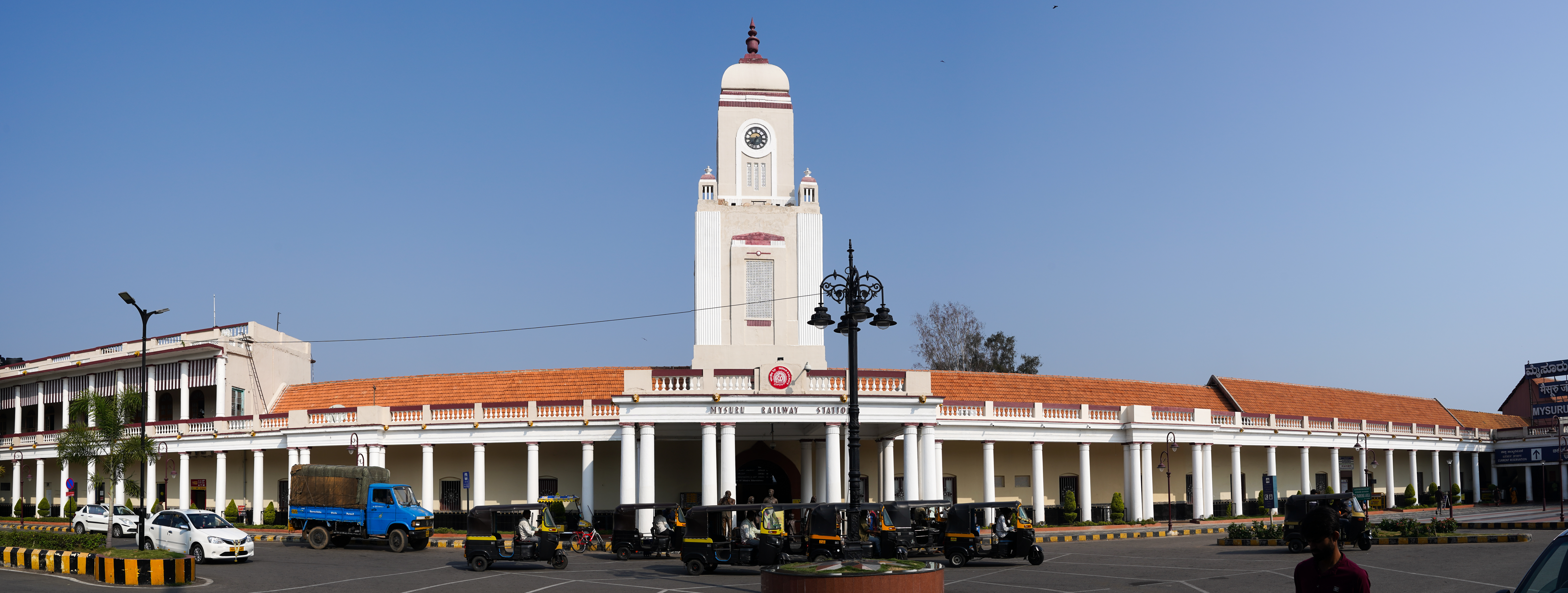
Mysore Junction railway station

Mysore Junction railway station has three lines, connecting it to KSR Bengaluru, Mangaluru Central, and Chamarajanagar. The first railway line established in the city was the Bangalore–Mysore Junction metre gauge line, which was commissioned in 1882. Railway lines that connect the city to Chamarajanagara and Mangaluru are unelectrified single track lines and the track that connects to Bengaluru is an electrified double track line. Mysore Railway Junction comes under the jurisdiction of South Western Railway zone of the Indian Railways. Within the city limits of Mysore, there are two small stations in the line which connects to Chamarajanagara. They are Ashokpuram and Chamarajapuram. The fastest train to serve the city is the Shatabdi Express which goes to Chennai Central via Bengaluru. A satellite terminal is planned at Naganahalli to reduce congestion in the main railway station. On 20 June 2022, Prime Minister Narendra Modi laid the foundation to upgrade the present city railway junction. The ₹385 crore project envisages construction of another three platforms, four pit lines and four stabling lines to make nine platforms. Additionally, the Naganahali station will be expanded with a coach complex and MEMU hub, and two more platforms to reduce congestion in the city railway junction.

=== Air ===
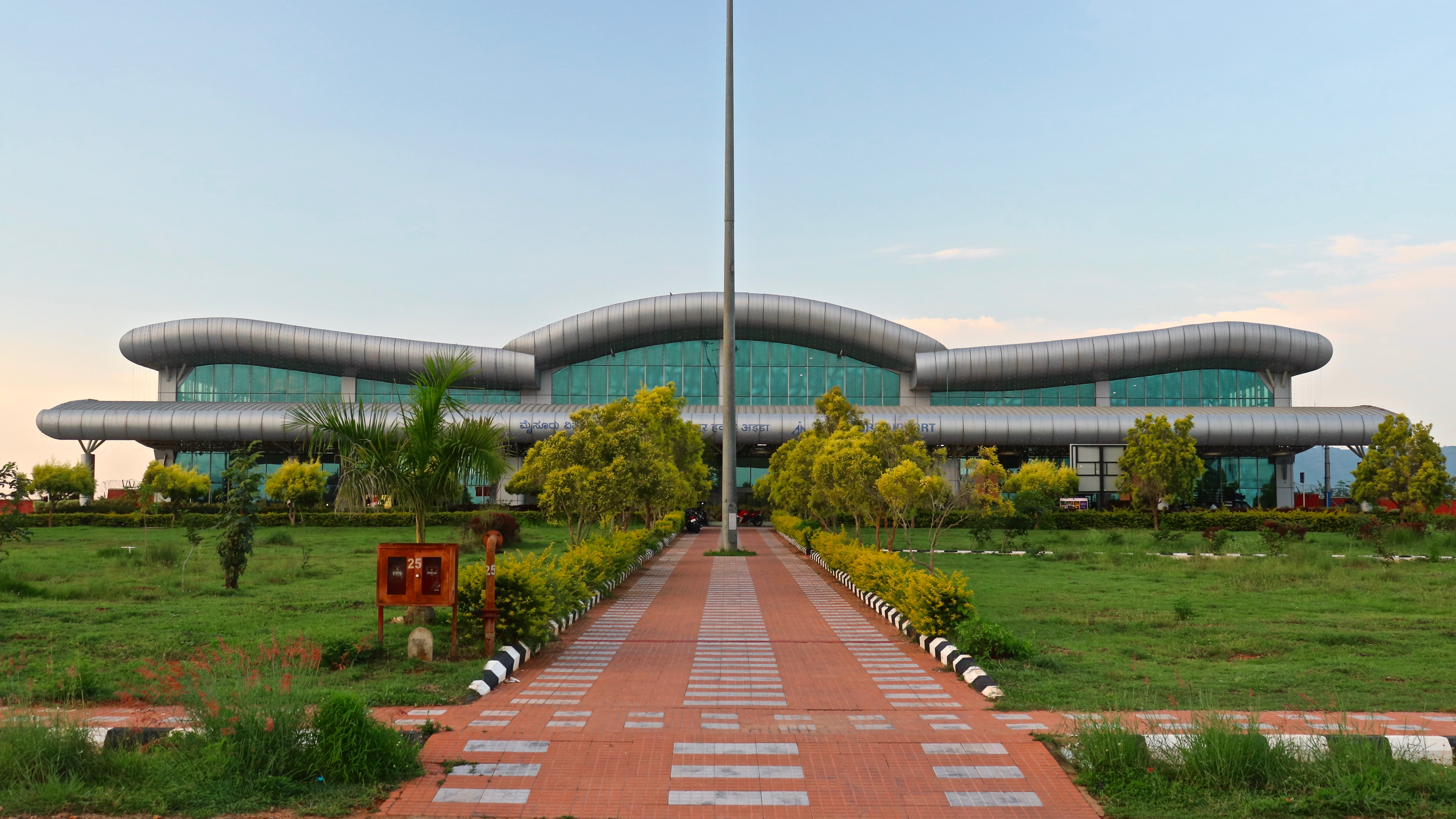
Mysore Airport

Mysore Airport is a domestic airport and is located near the village of Mandakalli, 10 kilometres south of the centre of the city. It was built by the kings of Mysore in early 1940s. Mysore Airport currently serves the city of Mysore and is connected to multiple domestic locations including Chennai and Hyderabad. The current runway is not able to handle big flights and hence a runway expansion is about to take place expanding the runway from 1.7 km to 2.8 km and will be upgraded to international airport after the expansion. The nearest International airport is Bangalore Airport.

== Education ==
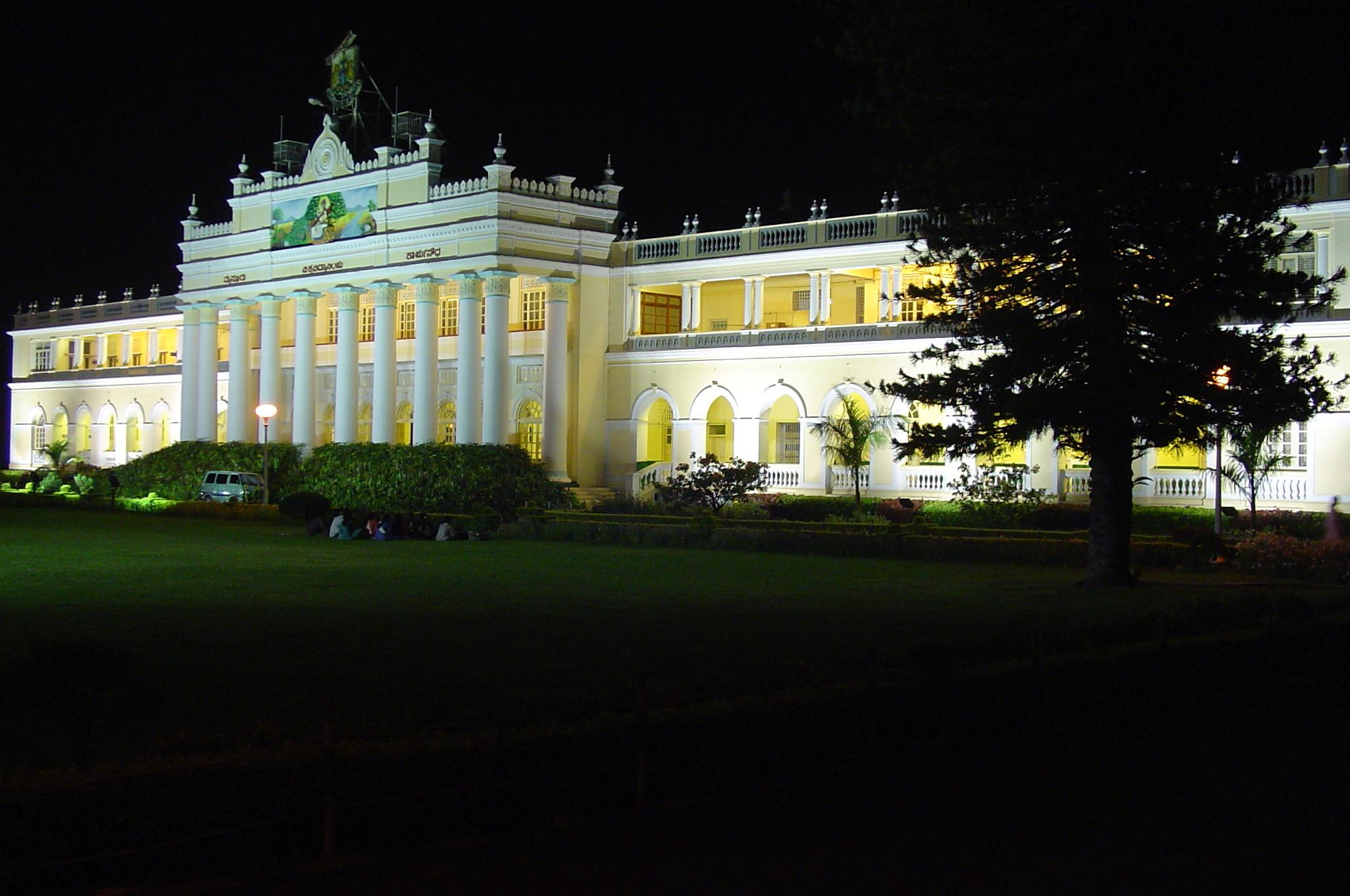
University of Mysore

Before the advent of the European system of education in Mysore, Agraharas (Brahmin quarters) provided Vedic education to Hindus, and madrassas provided schooling for Muslims. Modern education began in Mysore when a free English school was established in 1833. Maharaja's College was founded in 1864. A high school exclusively for girls was established in 1881 and was later renamed Maharani's Women's College. The Industrial School, the first institute for technical education in the city, was established in 1892; this was followed by the Chamarajendra Technical Institute in 1913. While the modern system of education have made inroads, colleges such as the Mysore Sanskrit Pāthaśhāla, established in 1876, still continue to provide Vedic education.

The education system was enhanced by the establishment of the University of Mysore in 1916. This was the sixth university to be established in India and the first in Karnataka. It was named Manasagangotri ("fountainhead of the Ganges of the mind") by the poet Kuvempu. The university caters to the districts of Mysore, Mandya, Hassan and Chamarajanagar in Karnataka. About 127 colleges, with a total of 53,000 students, are affiliated with the university. Its alumni include Kuvempu, Gopalakrishna Adiga, S. L. Bhyrappa, U. R. Ananthamurthy and N.R. Narayana Murthy. Engineering education began in Mysore with the establishment in 1946 of the National Institute of Engineering, the second oldest engineering college in the state. The Mysore Medical College, founded in 1924, was the first medical college to be started in Karnataka and the seventh in India. National institutes in the city include te Central Food Technological Research Institute, the Central Institute of Indian Languages, the Defence Food Research Laboratory, and the All India Institute of Speech and Hearing. The city houses a campus multi-campus, multi-disciplinary private deemed university, Amrita Vishwa Vidyapeetham.

=== Universities ===
Established	University	Type	Level	Specialisation
1916	University of Mysore	Public	Undergraduate, Post-Graduate, and Doctoral Research	Multi-disciplinary
1948	National Institute of Engineering	Private	Undergraduate, Post-Graduate, and Doctoral Research	Multi-disciplinary
1996	Karnataka State Open University	Public	Undergraduate, Post-Graduate, and Doctoral Research	Multi-disciplinary
2008	Karnataka State Music University	Public	Undergraduate and Post-Graduate	Music
2016	JSS Science and Technology University	Private	Undergraduate, Post-Graduate and Doctoral Research	Multi-disciplinary

=== Autonomous institutes ===
Established	Institute	Type	Commissioning Body/Affiliation	Level	Specialisation
1992	Mahajana Law College	Private	Affiliated to Mysore University	Undergraduate, LLB	Law
1924	Mysore Medical College & Research Institute	Public	Affiliated to Rajiv Gandhi University of Health Sciences	Undergraduate, graduate, post-graduate, and doctoral research	Medicine
1928	Yuvaraja's College, Mysore	Public	University of Mysore	Undergraduate, graduate, post-graduate, and doctoral research	Basic Science
1946	National Institute of Engineering	Government-aided private	Affiliated to Visvesvaraya Technological University	Undergraduate, post-graduate	Engineering
1950	Central Food Technological Research Institute	Public	Set up by the Council of Scientific and Industrial Research	Research and development	Food technology
1961	Defence Food Research Laboratory	Public	Set up by the Defence Research and Development Organisation	Research and development	Defence and contingency food technology
1963	Sri Jayachamarajendra College of Engineering	Private	Affiliated to JSS Science and Technology University	Undergraduate, post-graduate and doctoral research	Engineering
1963	Regional Institute of Education, Mysore (NCERT)	Government	Affiliated to University of Mysore	Undergraduate, Post-graduate and Research in the field of Teacher Education	Educational Training and Research
1966	All India Institute of Speech and Hearing	Public	Commissioned by the Central Ministry of Health and Family Welfare	Undergraduate, graduate, post-graduate, and doctoral research	Audiology, speech, and hearing
1945	Sarada Vilas College	Private	Affiliated to Mysore University	Undergraduate, Graduate, LLB, Pharmacy	Educational
1997	Vidya Vardhaka College of Engineering	Private	Affiliated to Visvesvaraya Technological University	Undergraduate, Post Graduate, Research and Development	Engineering

== Media ==
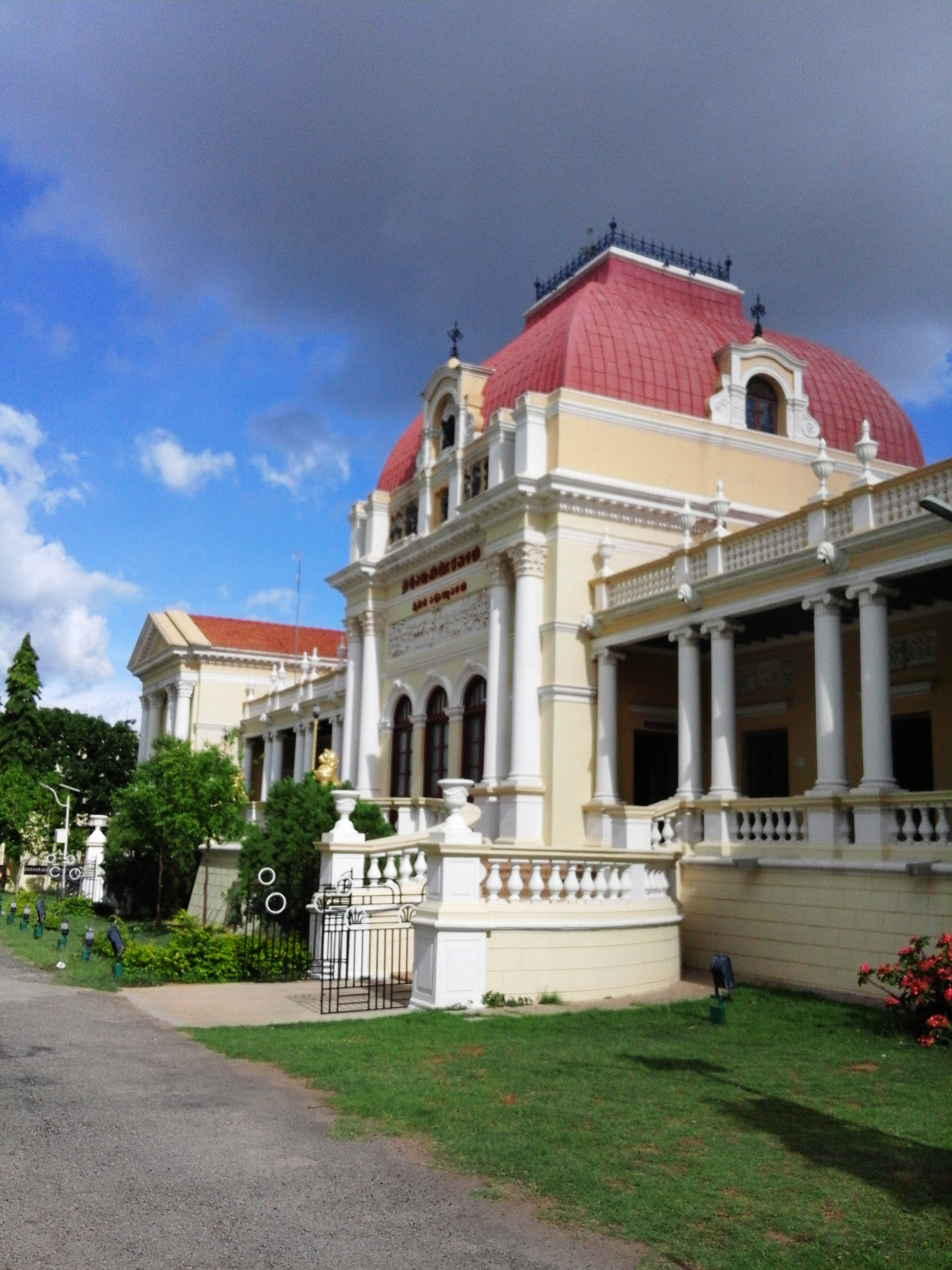
Oriental Library

Newspaper publishing in Mysore started in 1859 when Bhashyam Bhashyacharya began publishing a weekly newspaper in Kannada called the Mysooru Vrittanta Bodhini, the first of a number of weekly newspapers published in the following three decades. A well-known Mysore publisher during Wodeyar rule was M. Venkatakrishnaiah, known as the father of Kannada journalism, who started several news magazines. Many local newspapers are published in Mysore and carry news mostly related to the city and its surroundings, and national and regional dailies in English and Kannada are available, as in the other parts of the state. Sudharma, the only Indian daily newspaper in Sanskrit, is published in Mysore.

Mysore was the location of the first private radio broadcasting station in India when Akashavani (voice from the sky) was established in the city on 10 September 1935 by M.V. Gopalaswamy, a professor of psychology, at his house in the Vontikoppal area of Mysore, using a 50-watt transmitter. The station was taken over by the princely state of Mysore in 1941 and was moved to Bangalore in 1955. In 1957, Akashvani was chosen as the official name of All India Radio (AIR), the radio broadcaster of the Government of India. The AIR station at Mysore broadcasts an FM radio channel at 100.6 MHz, and Gyan Vani broadcasts on 105.6. BIG FM, Radio Mirchi and Red FM are the three private FM channels operating in the city.

Mysore started receiving television broadcasts in the early 1980s, when Doordarshan (public service broadcaster of the Indian government) started broadcasting its national channel all over India. This was the only channel available to Mysoreans until Star TV started satellite channels in 1991. Direct-to-home channels are now available in Mysore.

== Sports ==
The Wodeyar kings of Mysore were patrons of games and sports. King Krishnaraja Wodeyar III had a passion for indoor games. He invented new board games and popularised the ganjifa card game. Malla-yuddha (traditional wrestling) has a history in Mysore dating back to the 16th century. The wrestling competition held in Mysore during the Dasara celebrations attracts wrestlers from all over India. An annual sports meeting is organised there during the Dasara season too.

In 1997 Mysore and Bangalore co-hosted the city's biggest sports event ever, the National Games of India. Mysore was the venue for six sports: archery, gymnastics, equestrianism, handball, table tennis and wrestling. Cricket is by far the most popular sport in Mysore. The city has five established cricket grounds. Javagal Srinath, who represented India for several years as its frontline fast bowler, comes from Mysore. Other prominent sportsmen from the city are Prahlad Srinath, who has represented India in Davis Cup tennis tournaments; Reeth Abraham, a national champion in the heptathlon and a long jump record holder; Sagar Kashyap, the youngest Indian to officiate at the Wimbledon Championships; and Rahul Ganapathy, a national amateur golf champion. The Mysore race course hosts a racing season each year from August through October. India's first youth hostel was formed in the Maharaja's College Hostel in 1949.

== Notable people ==
- Srimushnam Srinivasa Murthy (1923–2009), Gandhian Freedom Fighter and Kannada writer

== Sister cities ==
- Cincinnati, Ohio, United States (2012)
- Nashua, New Hampshire, United States (2016)

== See also ==
- C V Rangacharlu Memorial Hall
- List of cities in India by population
- Mahisha kingdom
- List of tourist attractions in Mysore
- Mysuru Local Planning Area
- Largest Indian cities by GDP
