= Mysore North =

Northern cluster of Mysore city

- Location within Karnataka Location within India
- Coordinates: 12.35149°N 76.64535°E
- Country: India
- State: Karnataka
- District: Mysuru
- Time zone: UTC+5:30 (IST)

Mysore North is a cluster of suburbs in the northern side of Mysore. The city is divided as Northern and Southern clusters or blocks for administration. Mysore North hosts separate Zone for many Government offices like Block Educational Officer (Education department), Sub-Registrar's Office (Revenue department) and many other departments.

== Northern suburbs of Mysore ==
- R. S. Naidu Nagar
- Kanteerava Narasimharaja Pura
- Karunapura
- Hebbal
- Mandi Mohalla
- Udayagiri
- Rajeev Nagar
- Rajendranagar
- Gokulam
- Gayathripuram
- Bamboo Bazar
- Bannimantap
- Kesare
- Hale Kesare
- Hanumanthanagar
- Vijayanagar
- Jayalakshmipuram
- Yelwal

== Landmarks ==
- Bannimantap Parade Grounds
- Dufferin Clock Tower
- St. Philomena's Cathedral
- St. Philomena's College
- Visvesvaraya Circle

== Bus Station ==
The bus station located in R. S. Naidu Nagar was renovated and expanded by KSRTC as an initiative by JNNURM. Bus stand hosts amenities and services for the passengers like ATMs, India Post outlet and dedicated store for payment of Payment Centers

== Infant Jesus Church ==
A campus by name Pushpashrama is located in R. S. Naidu Nagar with close proximity to the Naidu Nagar Bus station. This area claims to host a Shrine which is believed to have constructed the structure resembling the Maharaja's Palace. A grand Gateway (30 feet high and 20 feet wide) is located at the entrance. A Grotto is located right to the Gateway and famous for its architecture. A Church with Octagonal base shape is located in Pushpashrama. The Church hosts special prayers during Christmas and will be decorated, illuminated for the special occasion. Cake mixing ceremonies and other Christmas related celebrations on Christmas day and several initiatives will be taken up at the venue.

== Image gallery ==
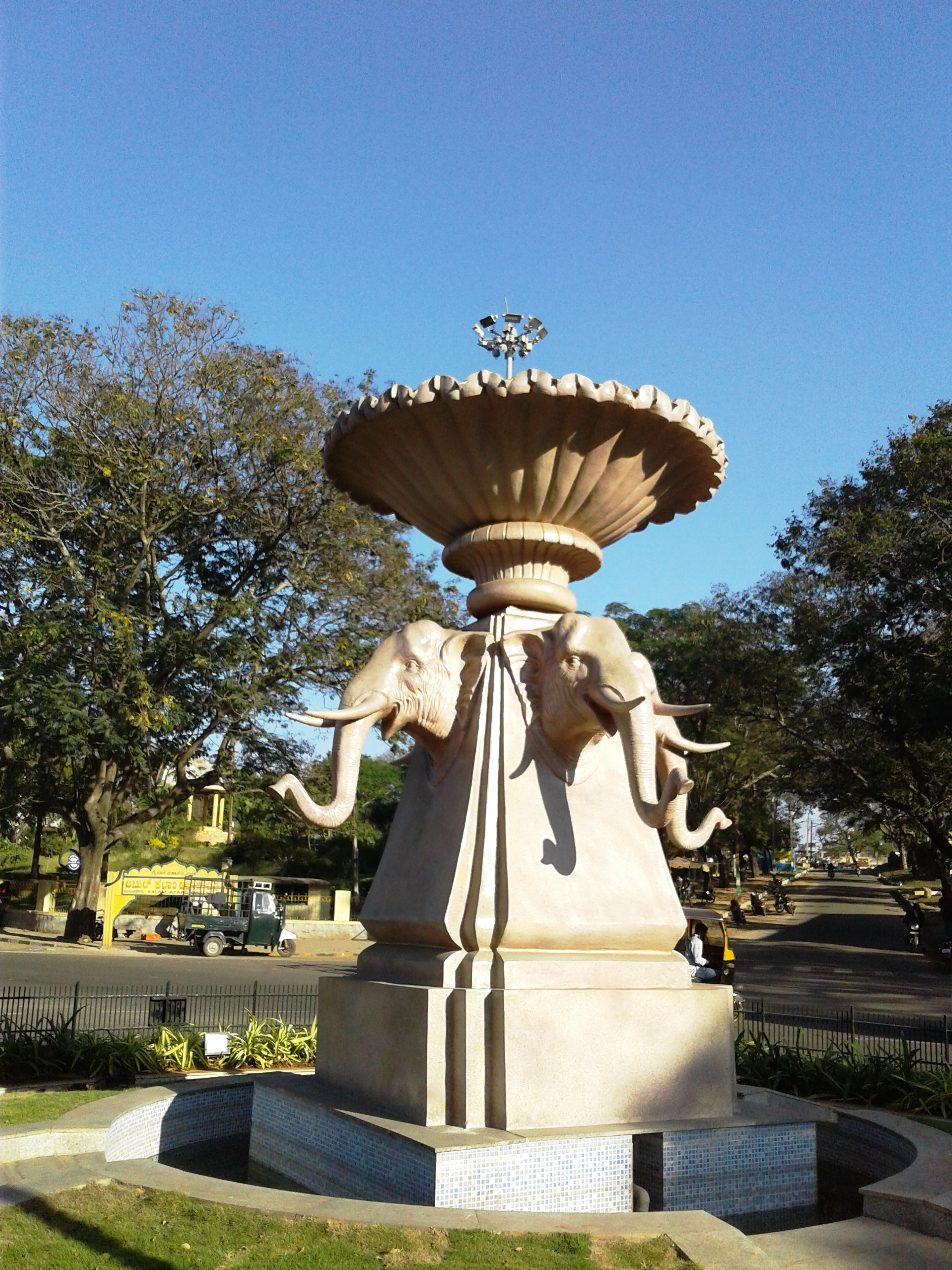
Bannimantap Circle

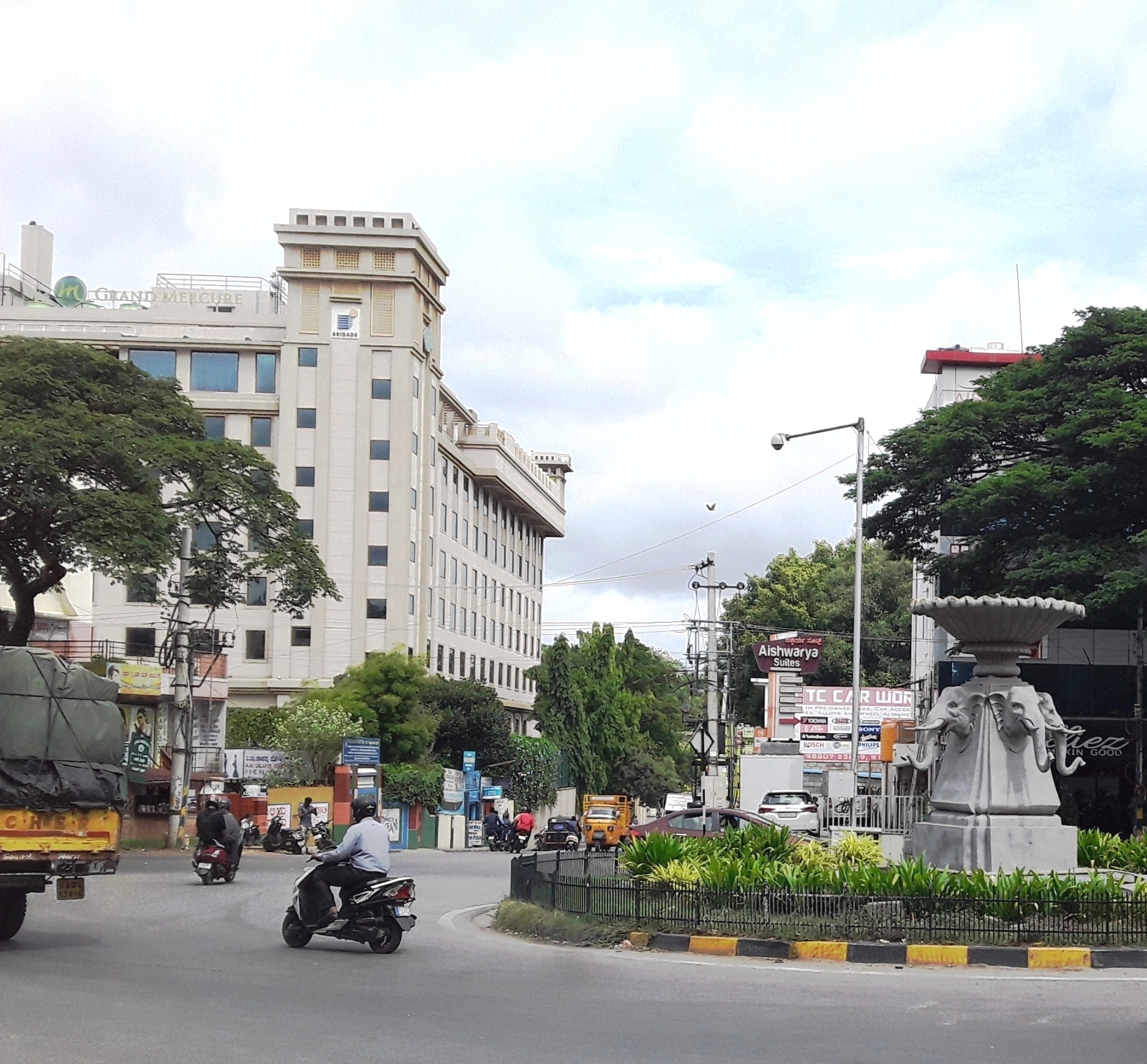
Highway Circle in Bannimantap

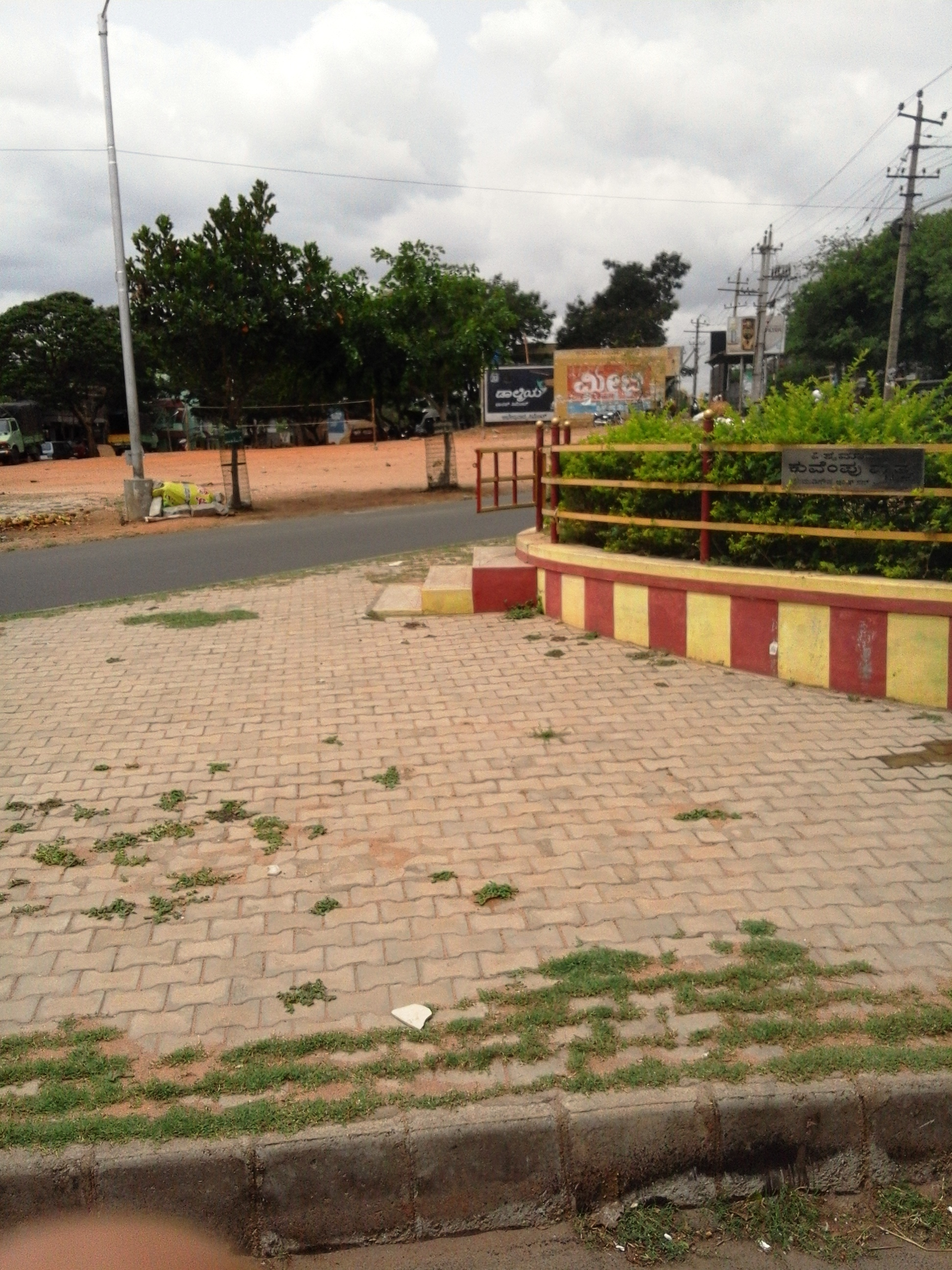
Surya Bakery Junction

Gokulam, North Mysore

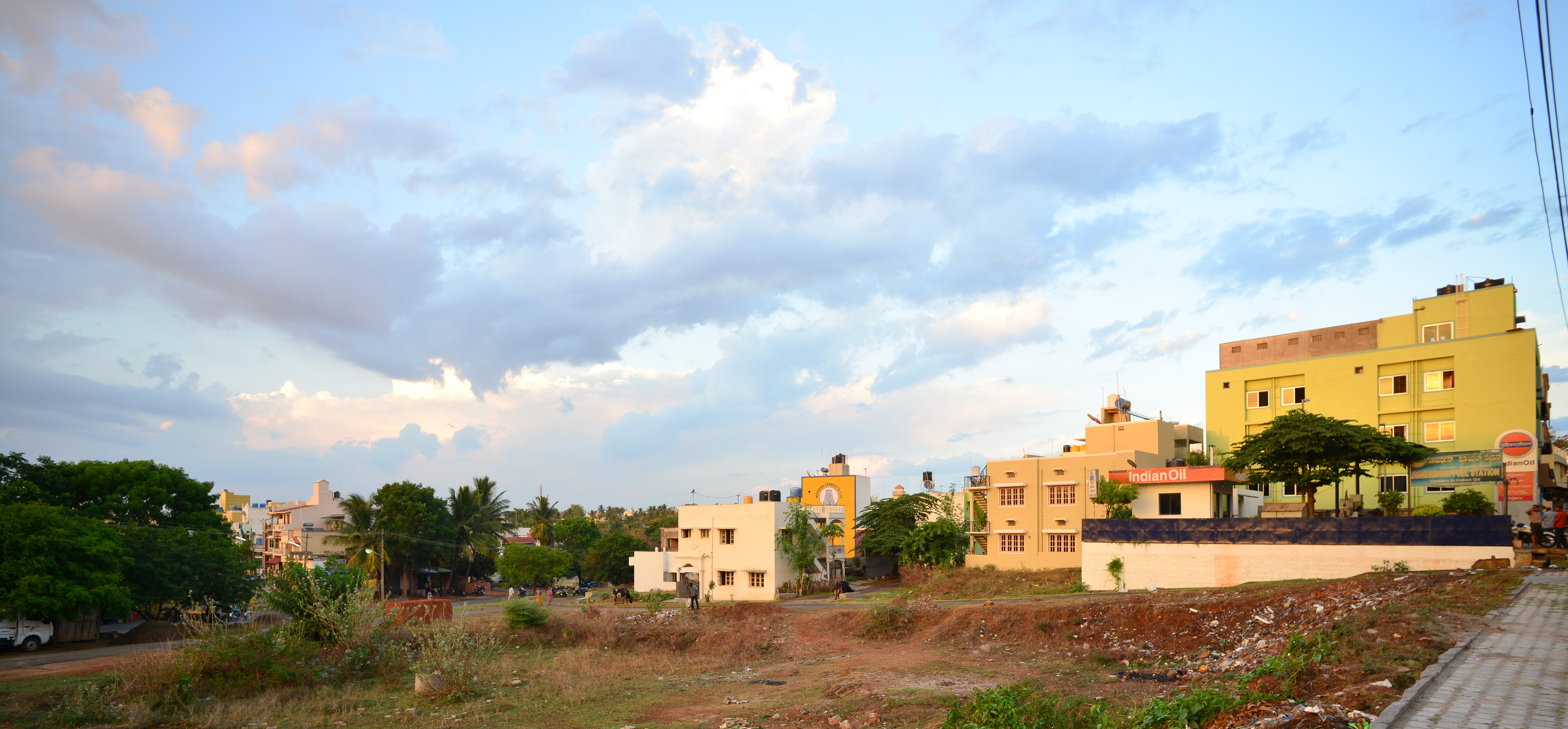
Gayathripuram, North Mysore

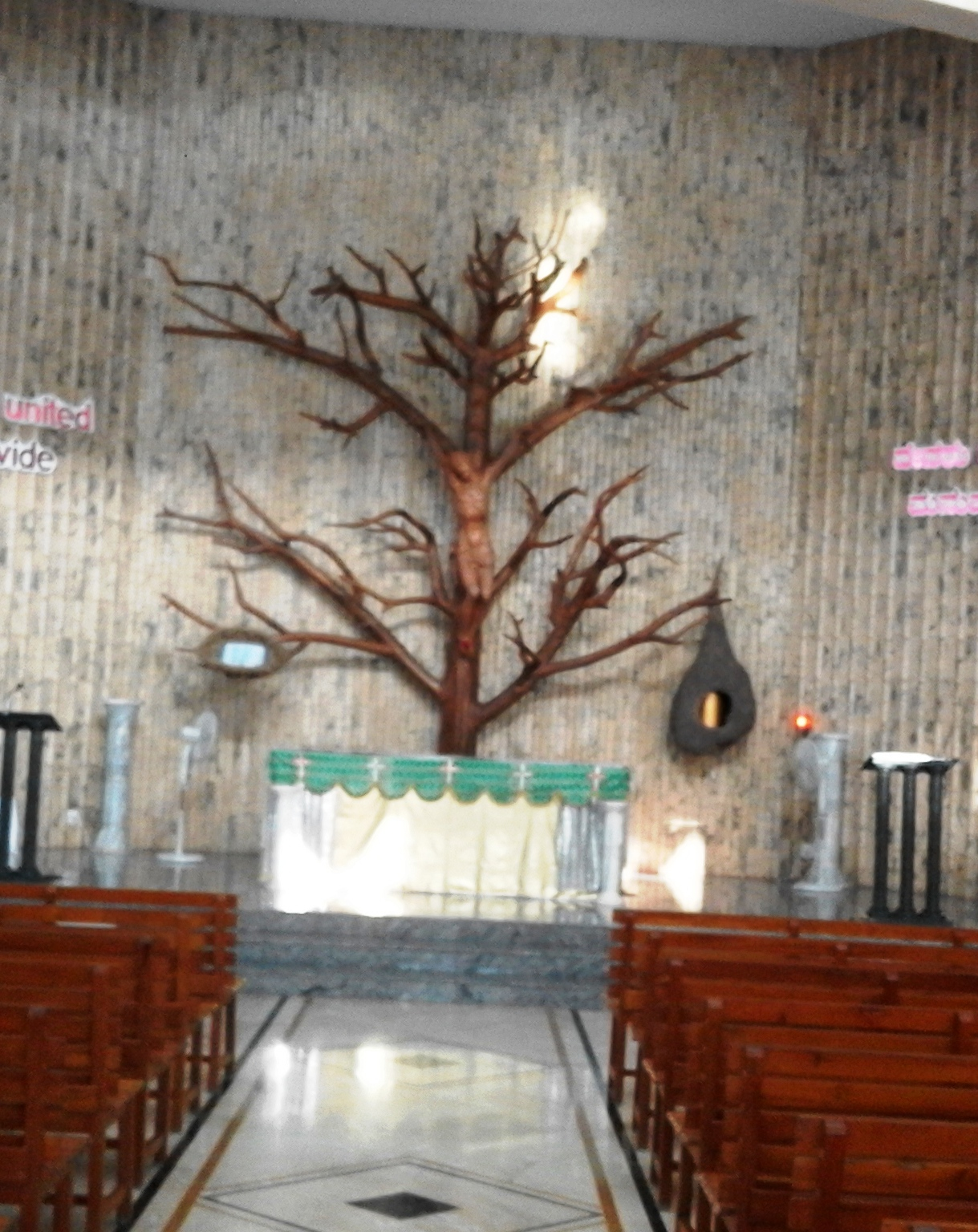
Infant Jesus Church

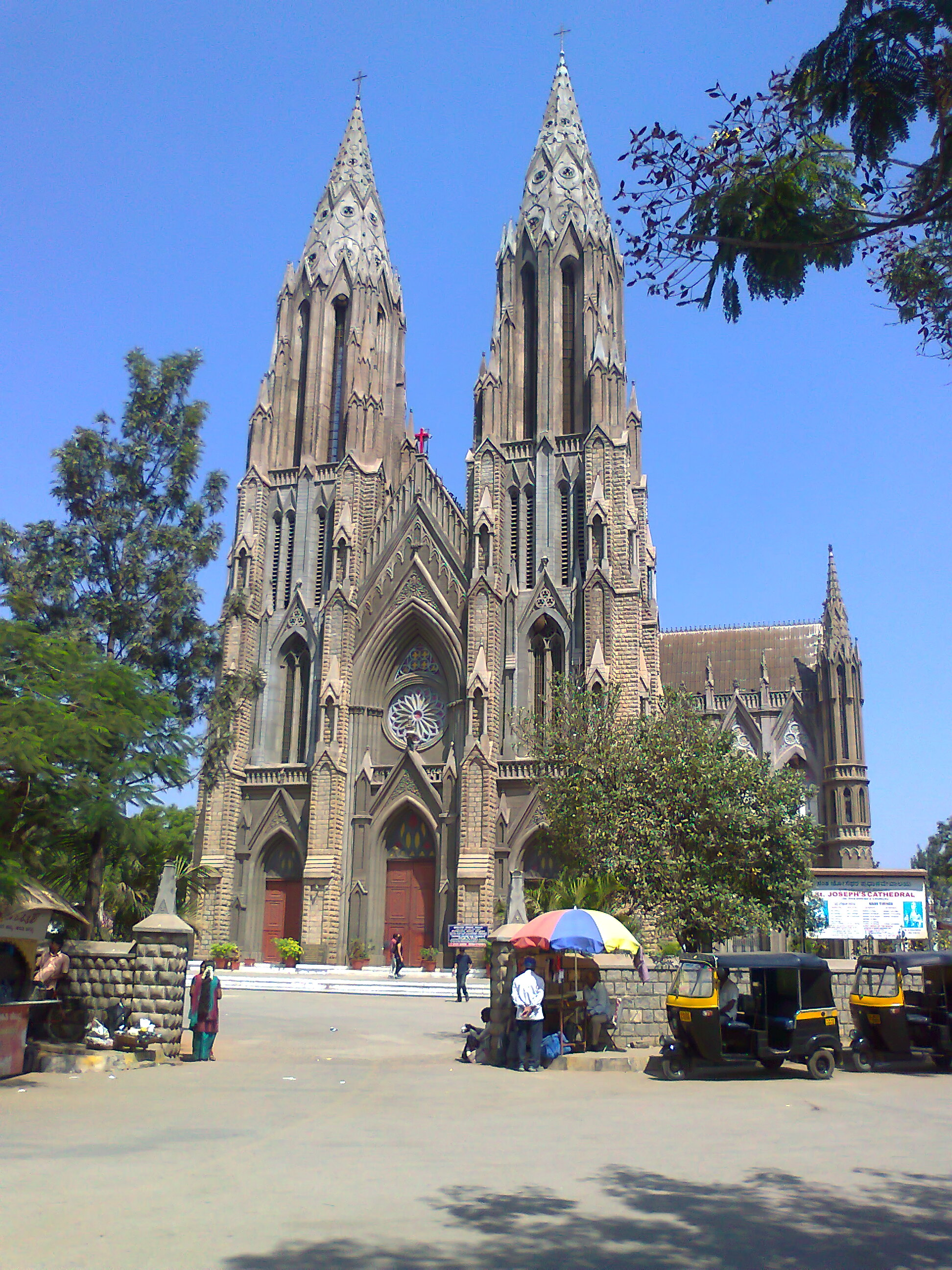
St.Philomena's Church

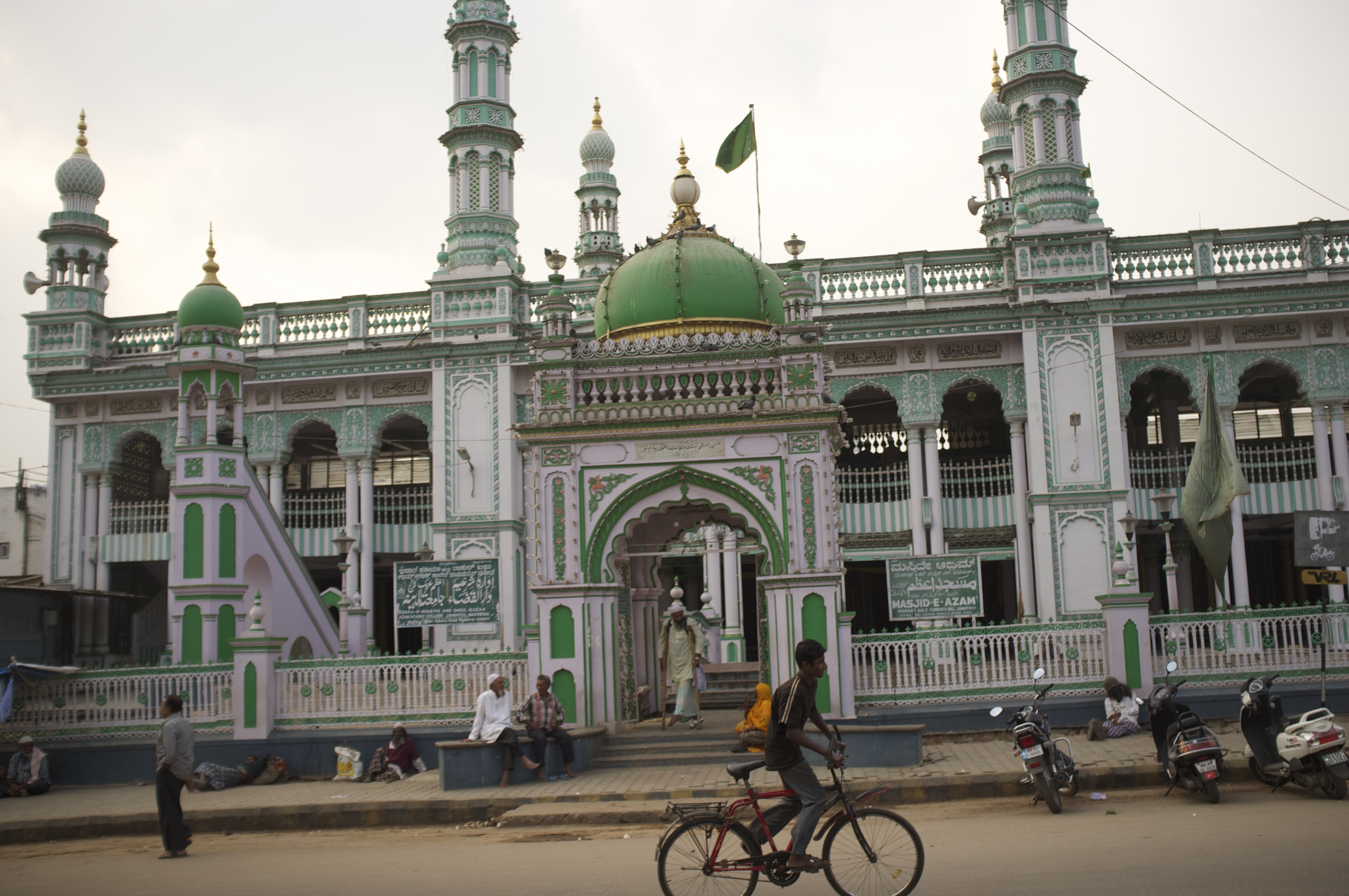
Mosque in Mysore

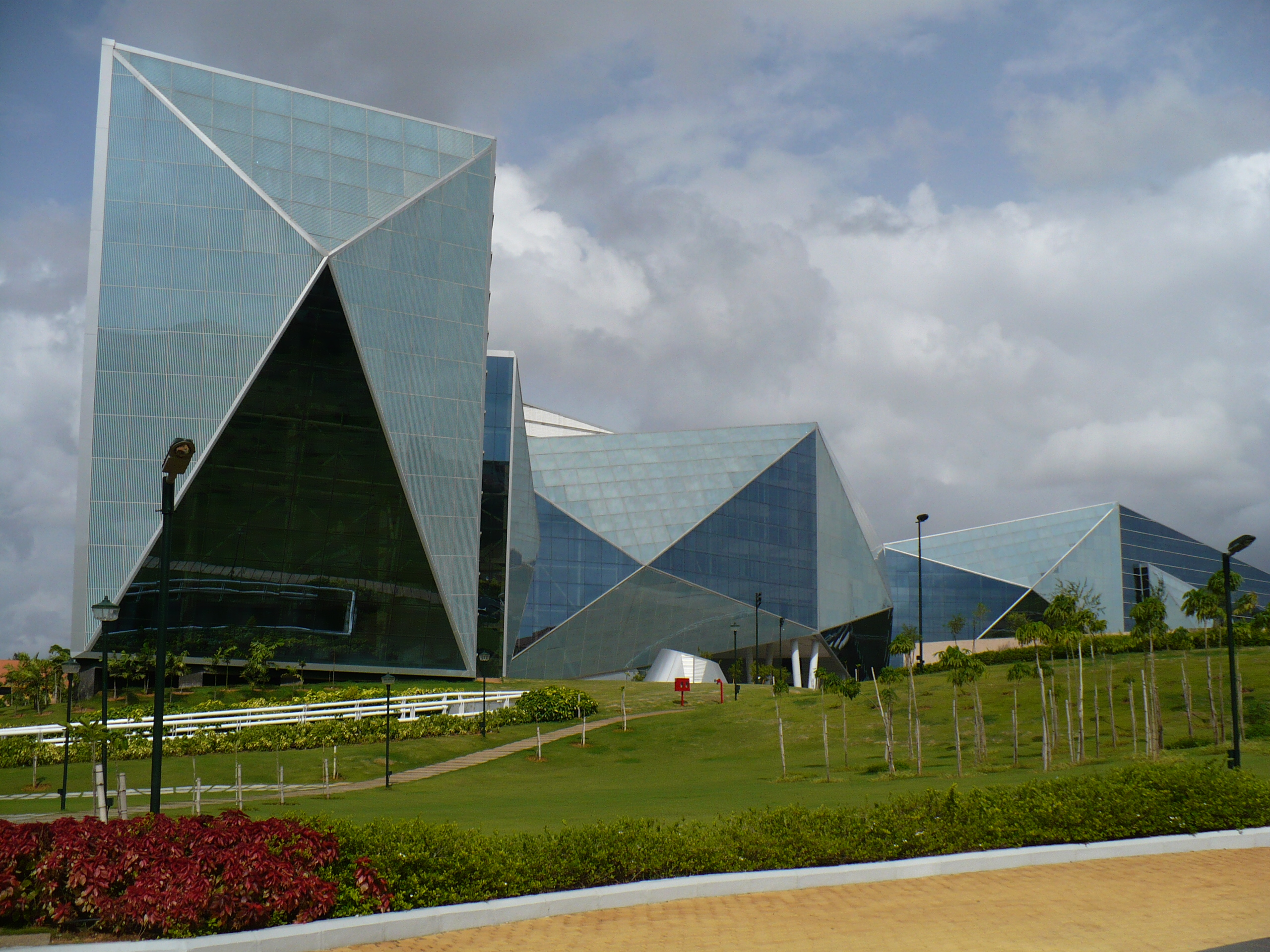
Infosys campus in Hebbal

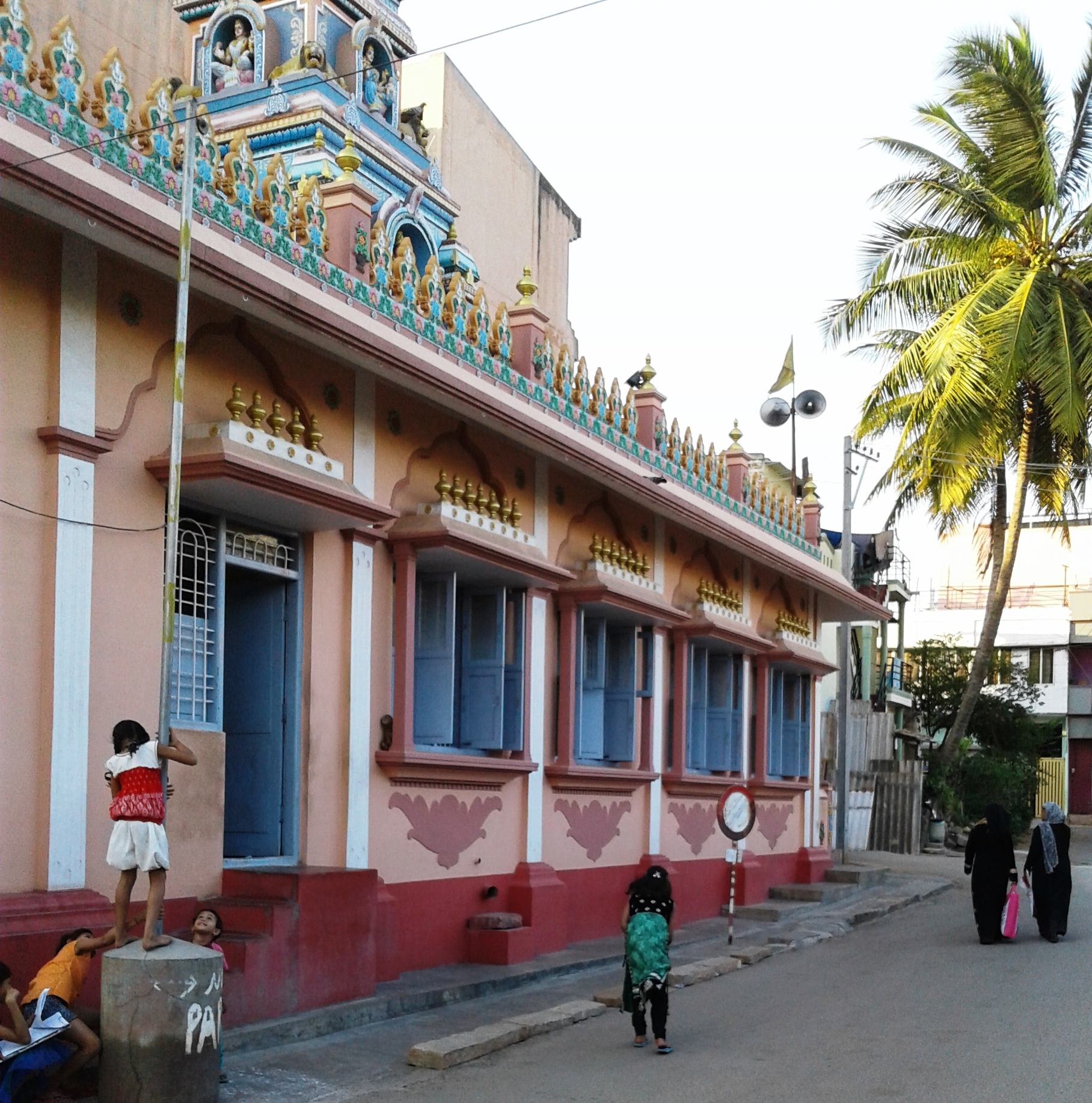
Hindu Temple in Ashoka Road

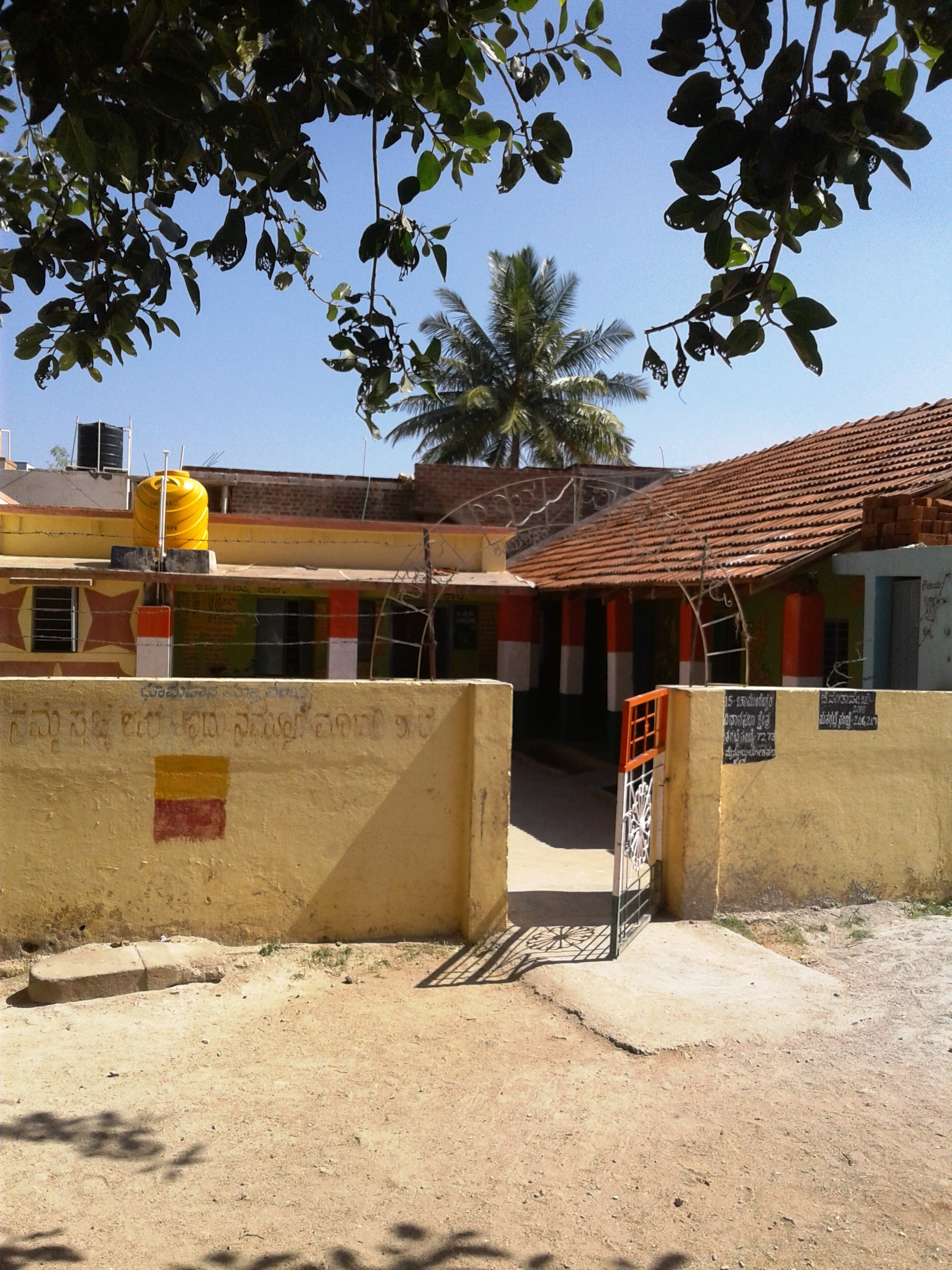
Government school in Kamalikere Hundi, Hale Kesare

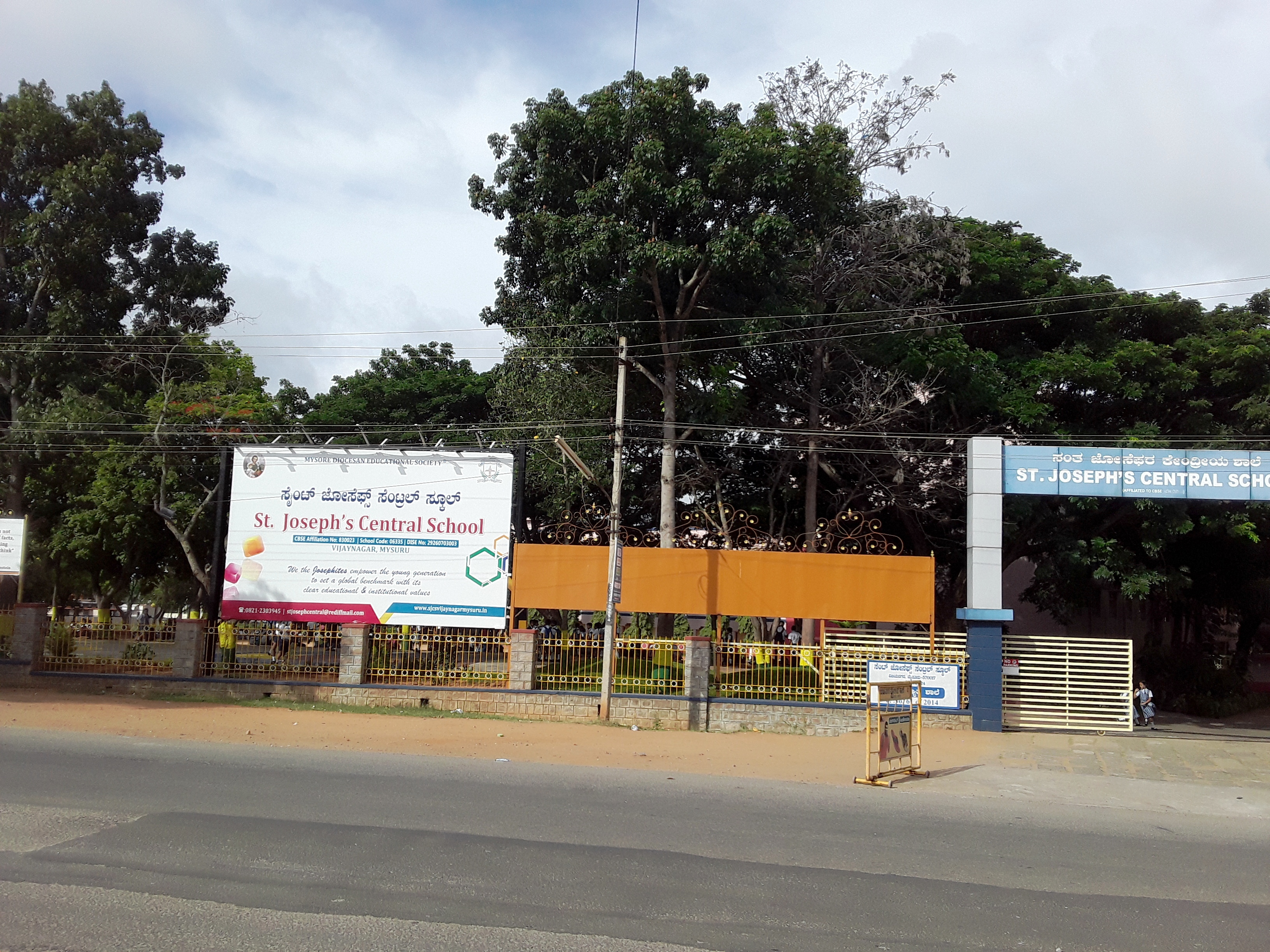
St.Joseph's School in Vijayanagar

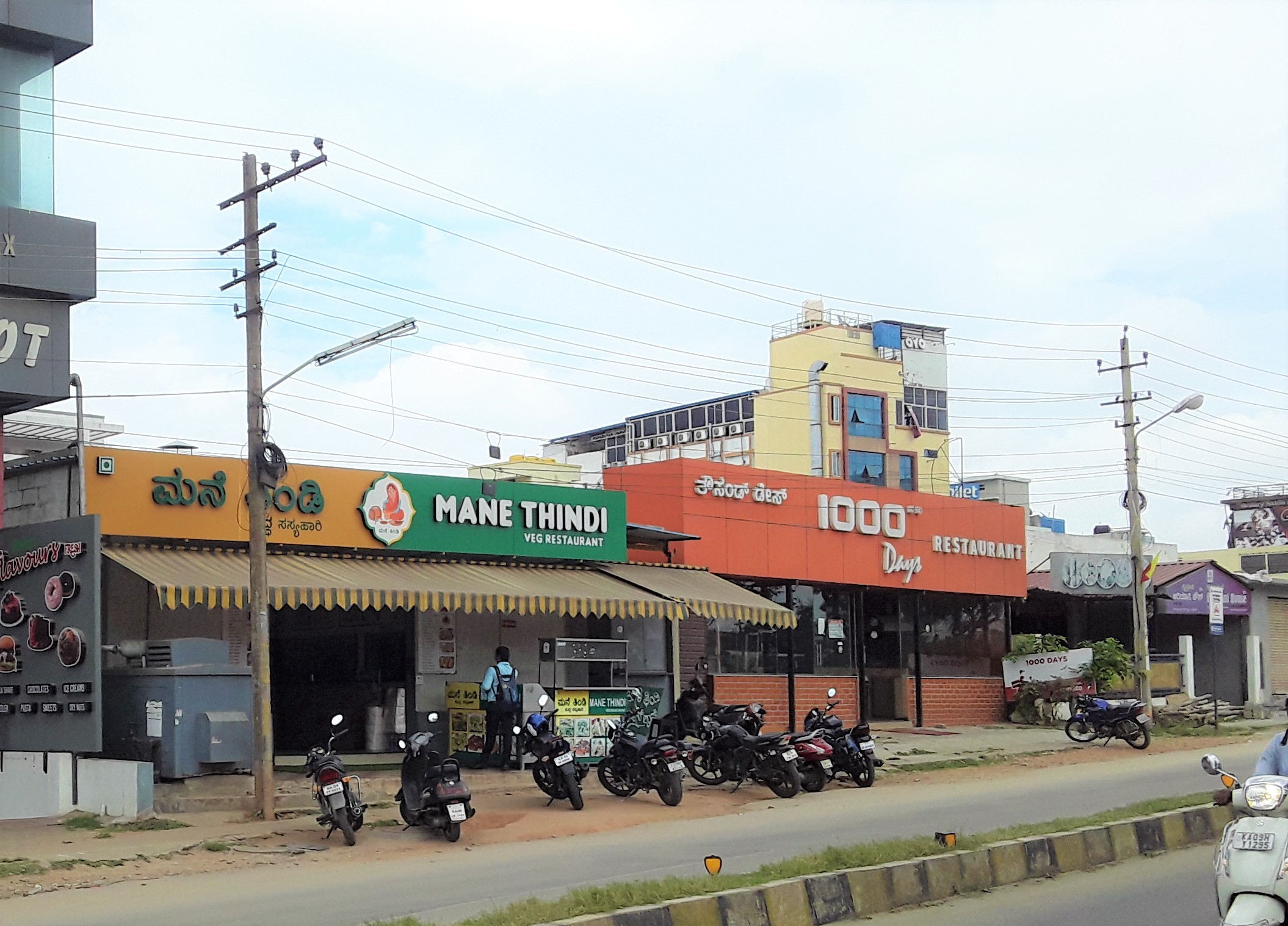
Water Tank Junction, Vijayanagar

== See also ==
- Hebbal
- Mandi Mohalla
- St. Philomena's Cathedral, Mysore
- Hale Kesare, village near R. S. Naidu Nagar
- Hanumanthanagar
