= Udayagiri, Mysore =

Udayagiri
- Location within Karnataka Location within India
- Coordinates: 12.323504191283428°N 76.67461786832315°E
- Country: India
- State: Karnataka
- District: Mysuru
- Time zone: UTC+5:30 (IST)
- PIN: 570019
- Vehicle registration: KA-55

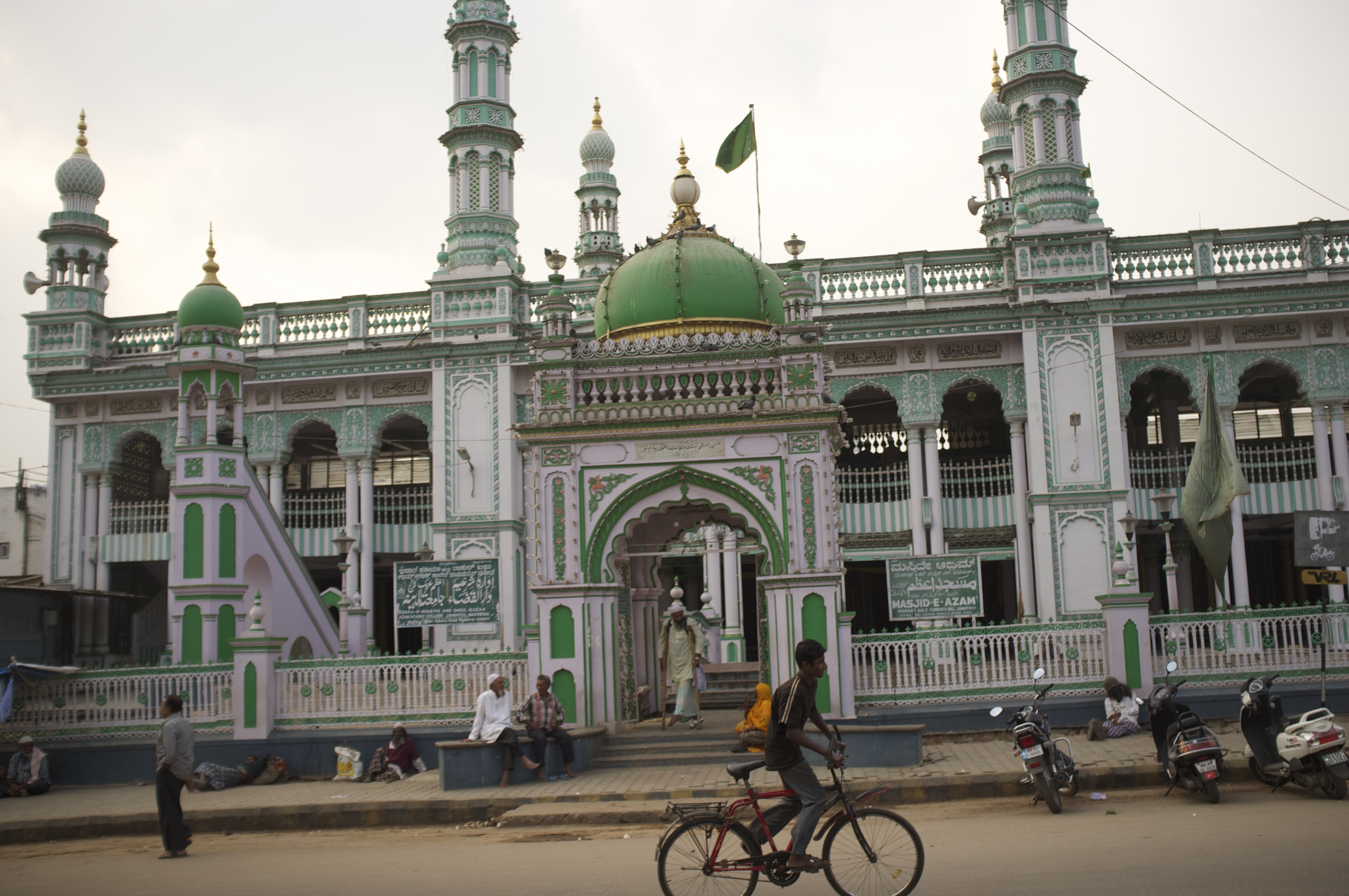
North of Mysore is mostly Muslim populated

Udayagiri is a suburb in the northern side of Mysore.

This locality has Muslim Majority population, alike most part of North-Eastern Mysore and hence there are many properties belonging to Wakf board. Shanti Nagar, Rajeev Nagar, KEB Colony and many other localities are a part of Udayagiri Suburb.

== Library ==
Syed Issaq, a daily wage worker, had collected more than 11,000 books and made a library so that poor men can read books. The Library was burnt on 9 April 2021 for unknown reasons and Syed told that he will not cow down and rebuild the library from the scratch. Mysore MP Pratap Simha, on 14 April 2021 handed over a cheque for Rs. 50,000 to rebuild the library of Syed Isak at Rajivnagar 2nd Stage, which was destroyed earlier. Pratap Simha, condemning the incident, said that he had spoken with the City Police Commissioner to conduct a thorough probe into the incident and bring the culprits to book. He ensured that the Government was with Syed Isak and BJP has extended all help to Syed, who had built the library on his own and looking after it since a decade and also said that the library stood on a Civic Amenity (CA) site and added that he would speak with Mysuru Urban Development Authority (MUDA) Chairman and take steps to rebuild the burnt down library on the same spot.

== Associations ==
Dr. B.R. Ambedkar Sangha and Udayagiri Kannada Sangha are some of the associations located here. Former Mayor of Mysore, Mr. Ayub Khan is a resident of Udayagiri.

== Lakes ==
Devanur Lake is one of the Lakes present in Mysore North. In recent times, the lake is polluted due to inflow of untreated waste from Sewage lines and Industries. Public in the nearby localities are constantly demand for the restoration and rejuvenation of the Lake.

== Image gallery ==
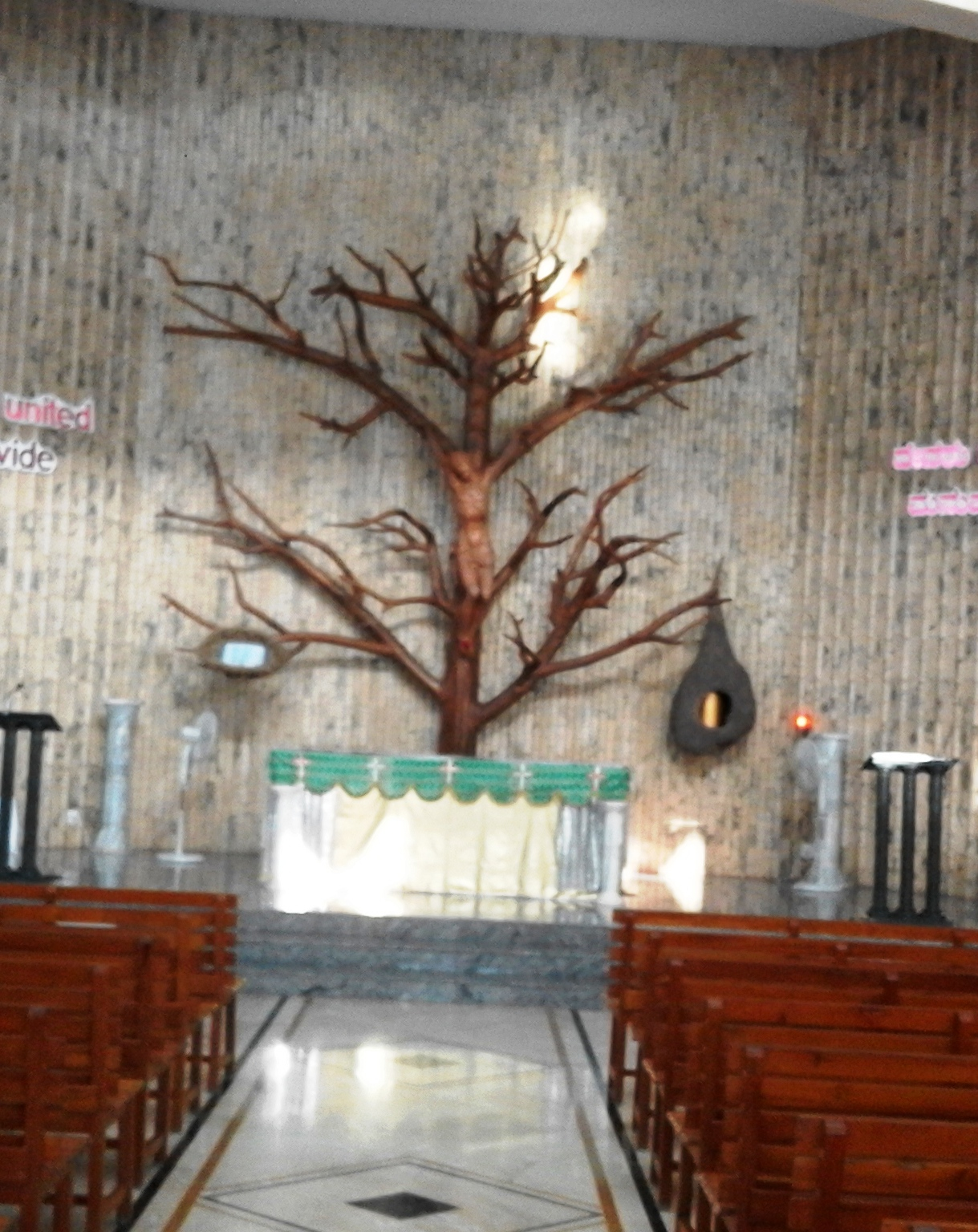
Infant Jesus Church

== See also ==
- Mysore North
- Hebbal, Mysore
- Mandi Mohalla
- St. Philomena's Cathedral, Mysore
- Hale Kesare
- Hanumanthanagar
- Mandi Mohalla
- Vijayanagar

Bada Mayan
