= Kanteerava Narasimharaja Pura =

Kanteerava Narasimharaja Pura Kanthirava Narasimharajapura
- Interactive map of Kanteerava Narasimharaja Pura
- Coordinates: 12.321656603285048°N 76.67868843921602°E
- Country: India
- State: Karnataka
- District: Mysore
- Time zone: UTC+5:30 (IST)
- PIN: 570019
- Telephone code: 0821
- Vehicle registration: KA-55

Kanthirava Narasimharajapura or K. N. Pura is a locality in the northern part of Mysore. Soligara Colony and Ghousianagar are prominent localities of Kanthirava Narasimharajapura. This locality is sometimes referred as Kantheerava Narasarajapura.

== History ==
Labourers from different parts of the state migrated to Mysore in search of work, following severe drought in 1980s. They settled at Kanteerava Narasimharajapura (located East of Kyathamaranahalli), as many affordable houses were vacant.

== Etymology ==
The locality was named after Kanteerava Narasimharaja Wadiyar, Yuvaraja of Mysore Kingdom (1894–1940).

== Education ==
Srikanteshwara Vidya Samsthe is a popular educational institution located in Kanthirava Narasimharajapura.

== Transport ==
Buses are available from the Mysore city bus stand to Kanthirava Narasimharajapura.

== See also ==
- Bannimantap Parade Grounds
- Naidu Nagar
- Hebbal
- Hale Kesare
- Mandi Mohalla
