= Bannimantap Parade Grounds =

Parade ground

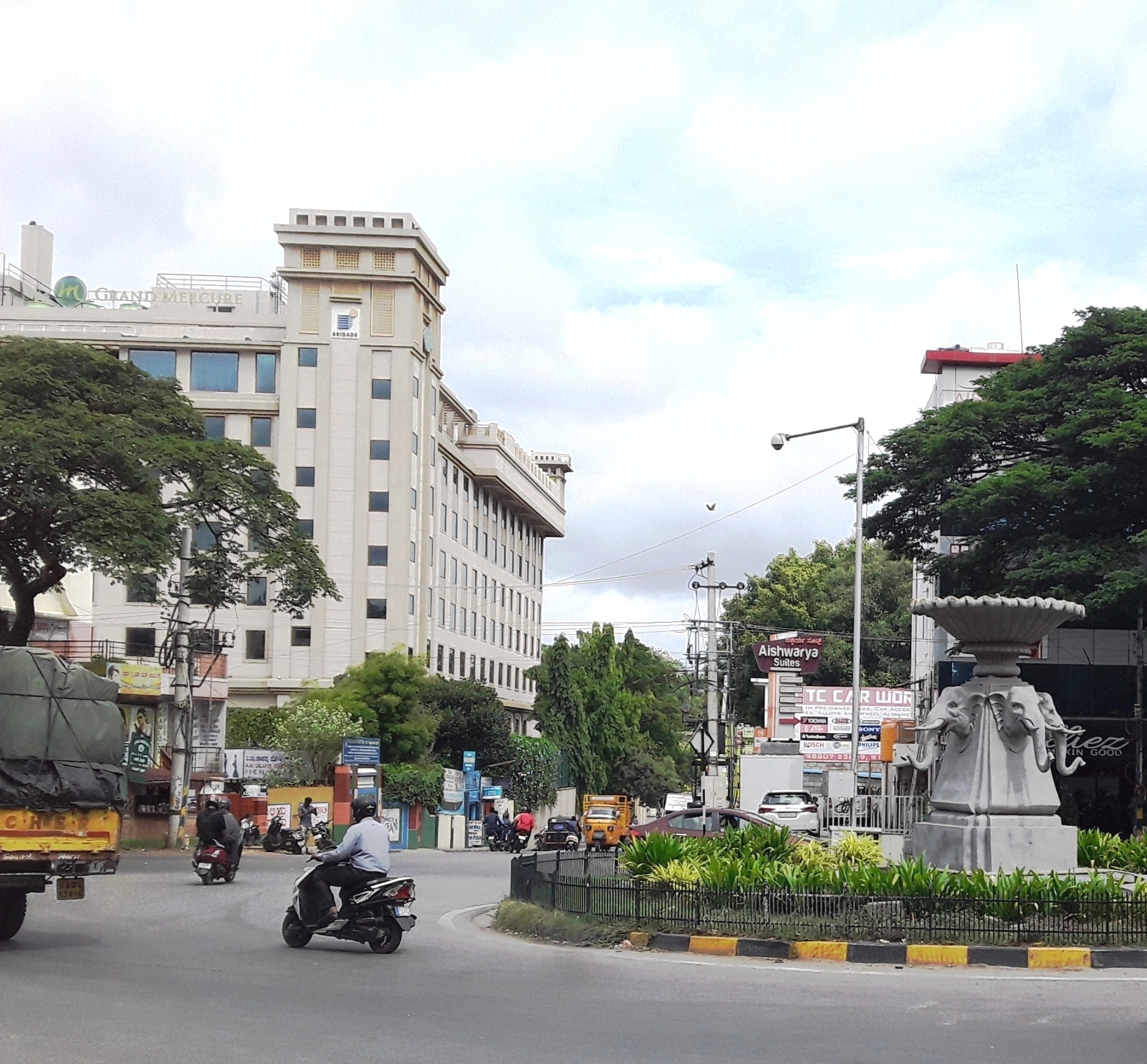
Highway Circle in Bannimantap

Bannimantap is an historical place in the Indian city of Mysore, Karnataka, India. where the world famous Mysore Dasara Jumbo Savari parade marks the end and after which cultural programmes are host every year on Vijayadashami in the presence of the Governor of Karnataka, Chief Minister of Karnataka and other Council of Ministers of the Govt. of Karnataka.

== Etymology ==
Bannimantap is derived from the word banni mara which means Prosopis cineraria tree in Kannada language. Whereas Mantapa or mandapa in the Indian architecture means outdoor hall or pavilion for the public rituals.

== History ==
Historical evidences of more than 400 years indicate Maharajas of Mysore offered pooja to the Bannimara (Banni Tree) located in the northern part of the Mysore (the present day Bannimantap).

== Current use ==
The Mysore Dasara festivities are carried out at this venue which features the Dasara Air Show.

== See also ==
- Hanumanthanagar
- Naidu Nagar
- Hebbal
- Hale Kesare
- Mandi Mohalla
