= Vijayanagar, Mysore =

Hebbal, Mysore
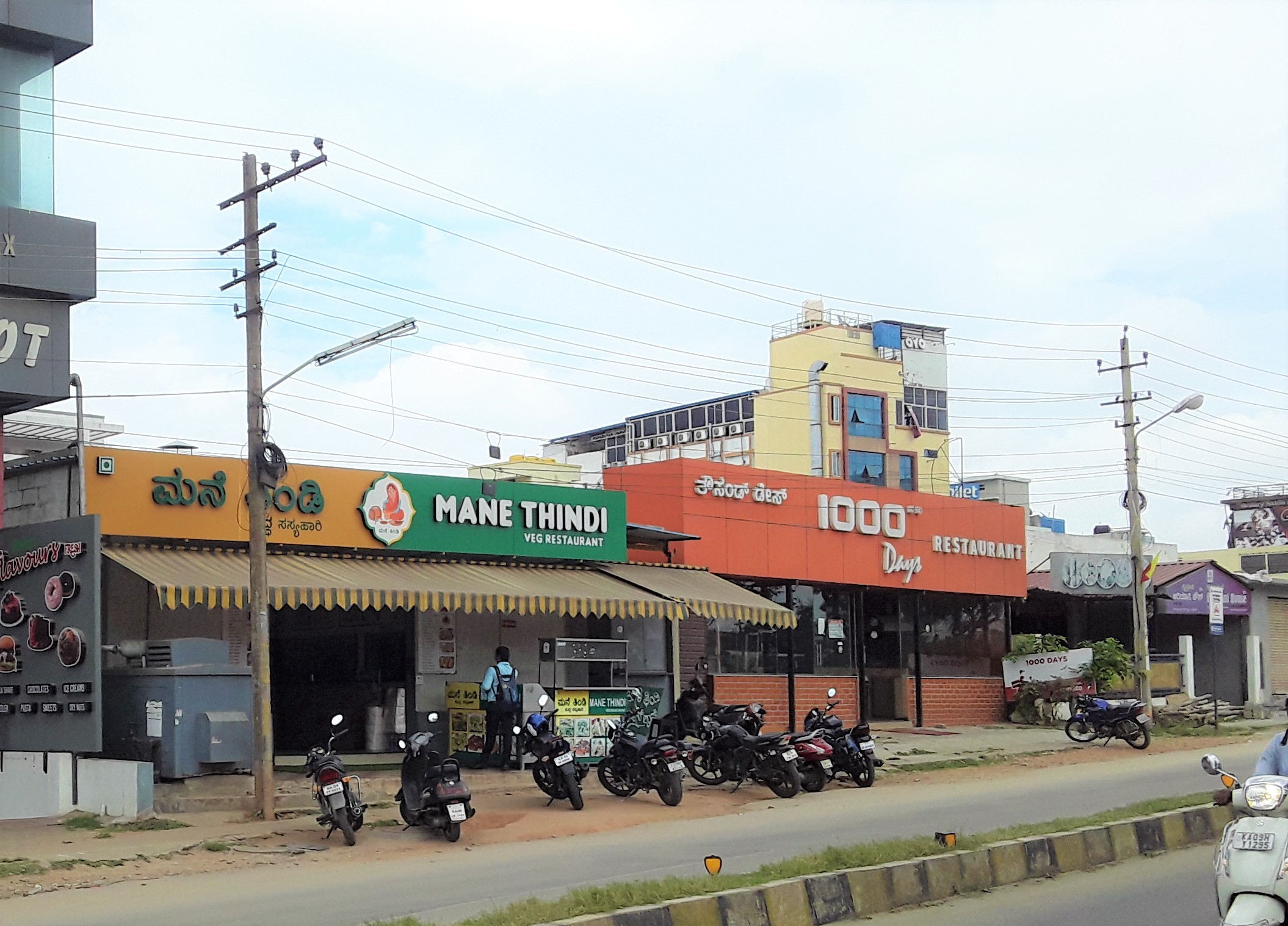
- Water Tank Junction, Vijayanagar, Mysore
- Interactive map of Hebbal, Mysore
- Coordinates: 12.329226220123761°N 76.61353555703394°E
- Country: India
- State: Karnataka

Vijayanagar and Hebbal are two areas of Mysore city in India. the growth of technology-related industry in the first decade of the 21st century has resulted in the city emerging as the second largest software exporter in the state of Karnataka, next to Bangalore.

== History ==
Traditionally, Mysore has been home to industries such as weaving, sandalwood carving, bronze work, and the production of lime and salt.

== Layouts in Vijayanagar ==
Vijayanagar was expanded in 4 stages.

=== Vijayanagar First Stage ===
Located Northwest of Hunsur Road a.k.a. NH275 and South of High Tension double Road, Vijayanagar 1st stage is one of the prominent localities in Mysore due to proximity towards Infosys campus Yoga Narasimhaswamy Temple, Vidya Vardhaka College of Engineering, Vidya Vardhaka Polytechnic, MUDA Sports ground and Cosmopolitan club are some popular landmarks in the locality.

=== Vijayanagar Second Stage ===
Located North of Hunsur Road a.k.a. NH275 and South of High Tension double Road, Vijayanagar is one of the prominent localities in Mysore. Ring Road a.k.a. NH 275K marks the Western boundary of the Layout. Sankranti Cirle, Vijayanagar Water Tank, Podar International School, St.Joesph's Central School, Sadvidya Semi-Residential PU College, Headquarters of Chamundeshwari Electricity Supply Corporation, IT centre of Karnataka Gramin Bank (formerly Headquarters of Kaveri Grameena Bank), Sangam Circle, Krishnadevaraya Circle, Hampi Circle and Vidya Vardhaka College of Engineering MBA Cell are the remarkable locations.

=== Vijayanagar Third Stage ===
Located North of Vijayanagar fourth stage, South of Hinkal and east of Ring Road a.k.a. NH 275K, 3rd stage is home for Sri Saptamatrika Chowdeshwari Temple, Sangam Circle, Vijayashripura, Basavaraja Circle, Mahaveera Circle. Jayachamarajendra College of Engineering campus marks the Eastern Boundary for 3rd stage. Vijayanagar Third Stage was included to Corporation limits on 19 October 2021.

=== Vijayanagar fourth stage (first phase) ===
Also known as Garudachar layout, the first phase of Vijayanagar fourth stage is located South of Vijayanagar third stage and east of Mysore Ring Road a.k.a. NH 275K. Twin Neem Tree, Mahalakshmi Bhandar are the Bus stops located here. Royal Concorde International School, Sri Adichunchanagiri Math, Kanchi Kamakshi Temple, Jaggesh Convention hall, and the Heritage Club are popular locations in this Community. Jayachamarajendra College of Engineering campus marks the Eastern Boundary for 3rd stage. Bhogadi 2nd stage is the Southern boundary for the Area.

=== Vijayanagar fourth stage (second phase) ===
Also known as Vinayaka layout, it is located along 80 Feet Road. Second phase is urbanized between Belawadi Road and Mysore Ring Road, which marks Western and Eastern boundary. Marimallappa Educational Institution, Swami Vivekananda Educational Institution, National Public School, Govt first grade college, Sankalp Temple trees are popular sites here. Hootagalli 3rd phase (which is often referred as Vijayanagar fourth stage – 3rd phase) is the Northern Boundary. RMP Layout, Preethi Layout, Deepa Nagar marks the Southern boundary for the Area.

== Notable organizations ==
- Podar International School
- Infosys Mysore
- Larsen and Toubro Mysore
- Vidya Vardhaka College of Engineering
- Sadvidya Semi-Residential PU College
- Starmark software Pvt Ltd Mysore

== See also ==
- Hebbal
- Mandi Mohalla
- Hanumanthanagar
- Hale Kesare, village near R.S.Naidu Nagar

== Gallery ==
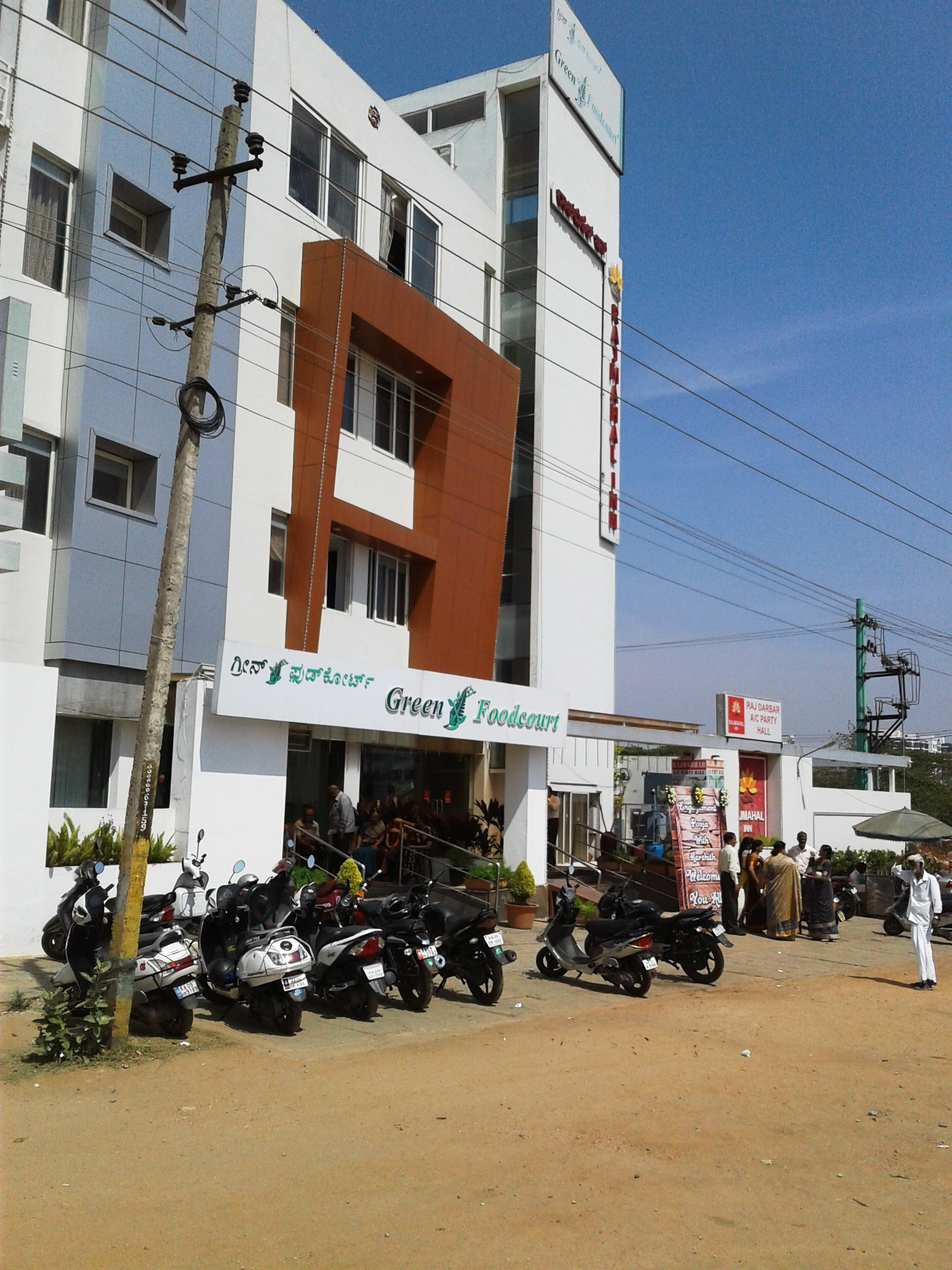
Aishwariya Junction

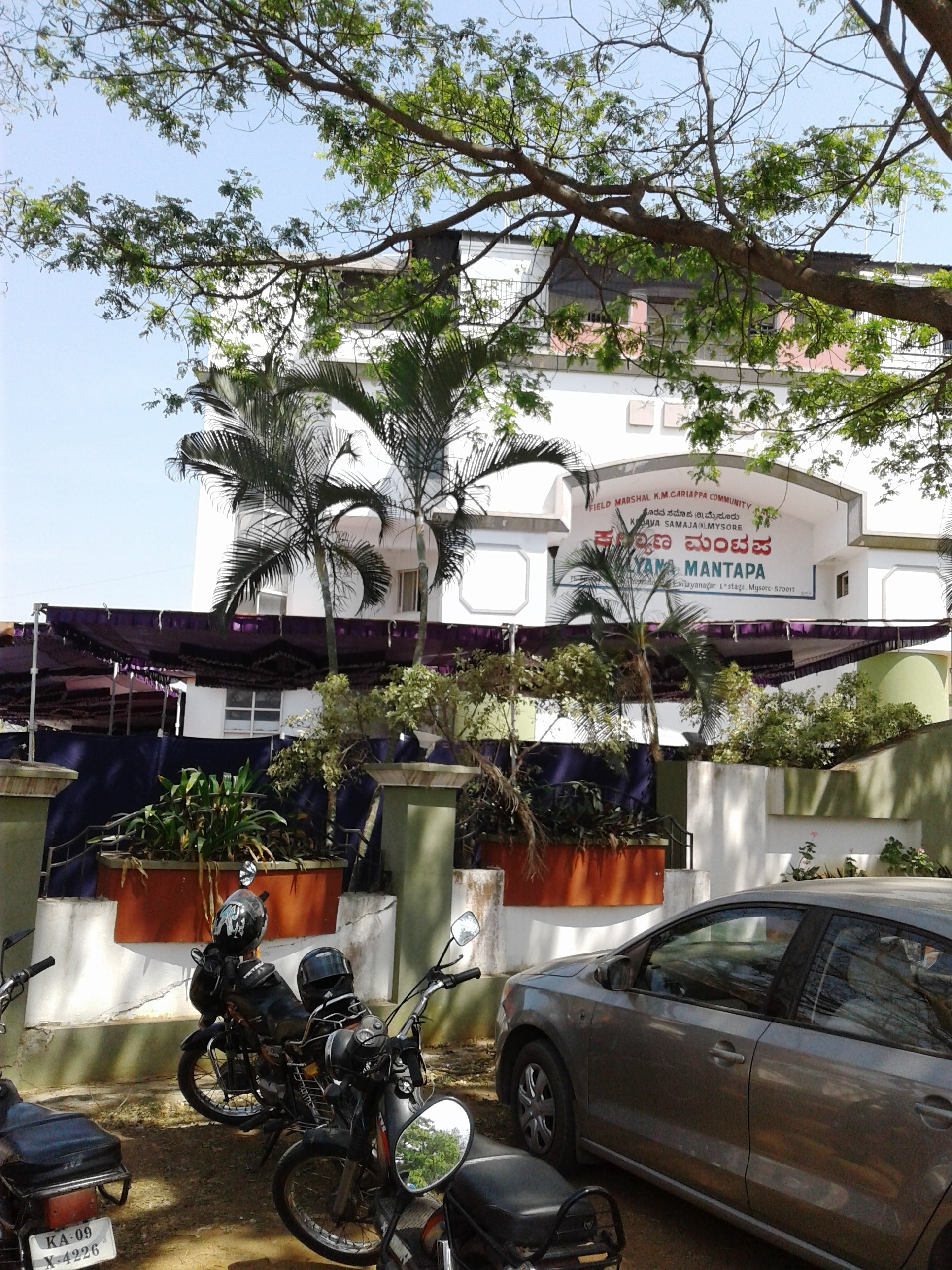
Kodava Community Hall

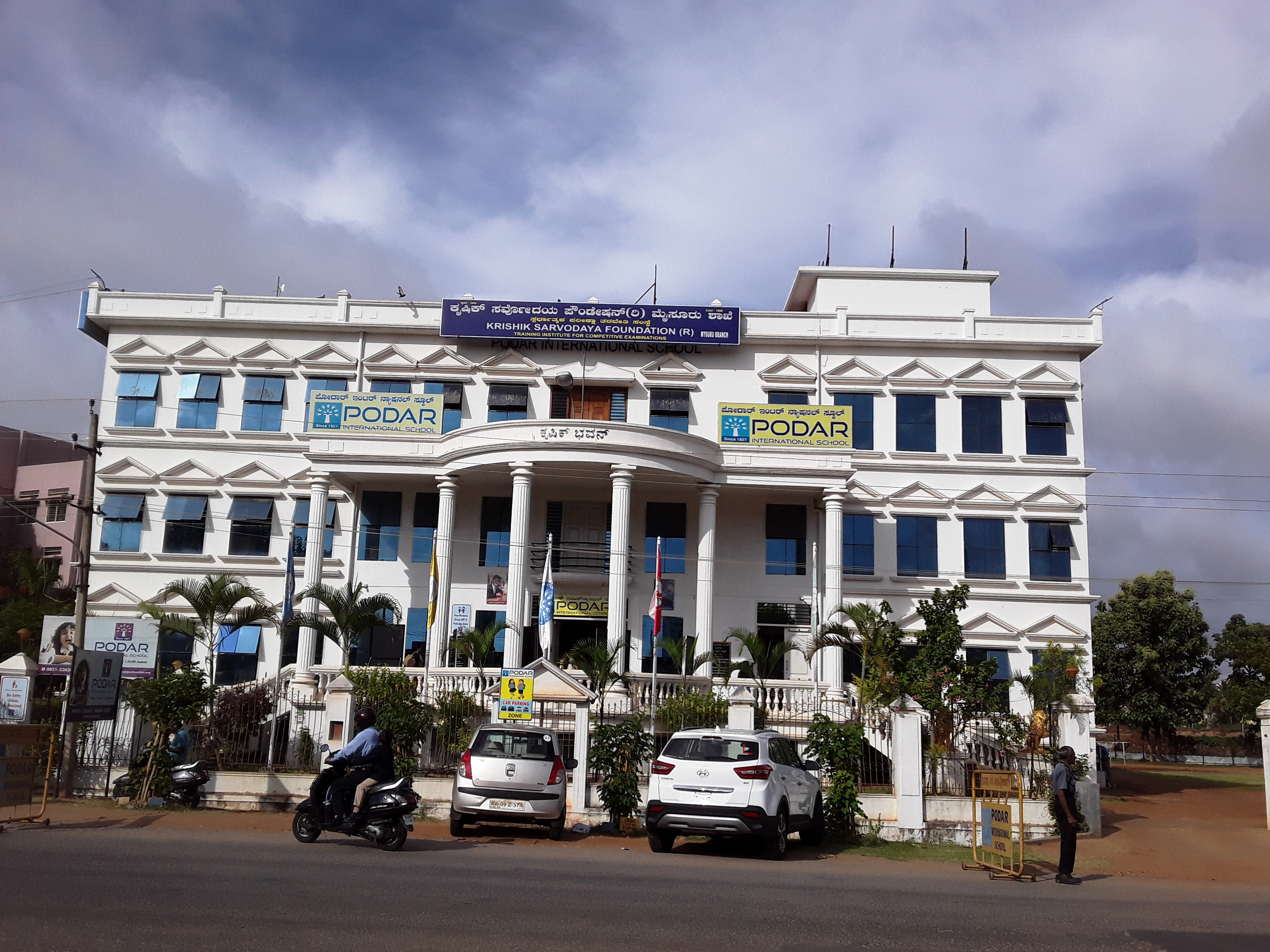
Podar International School

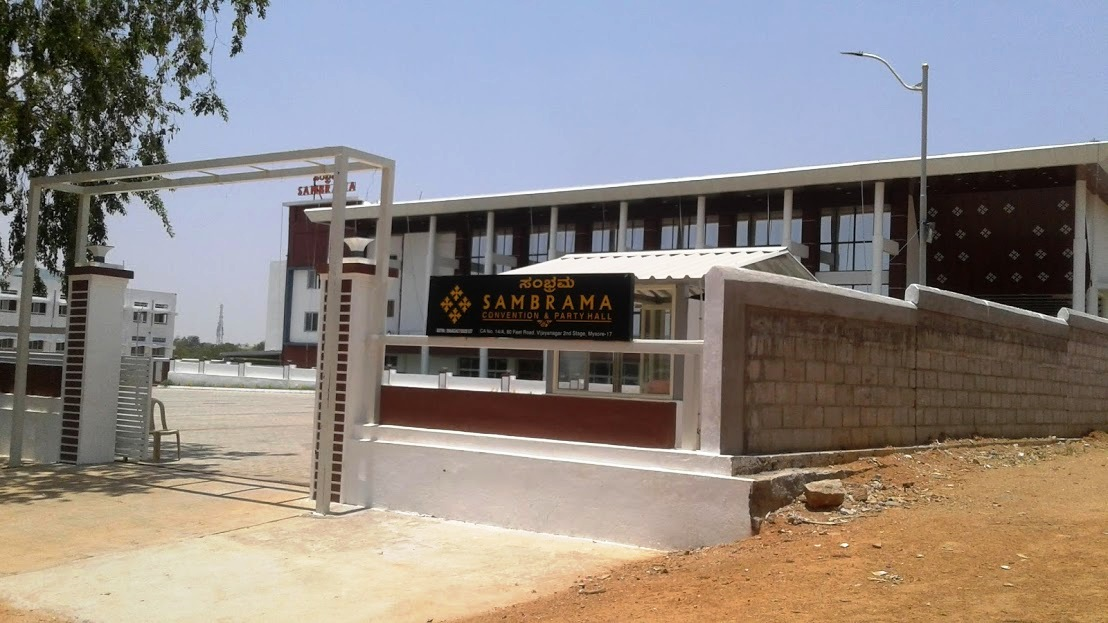
Sambrama Convention Centre

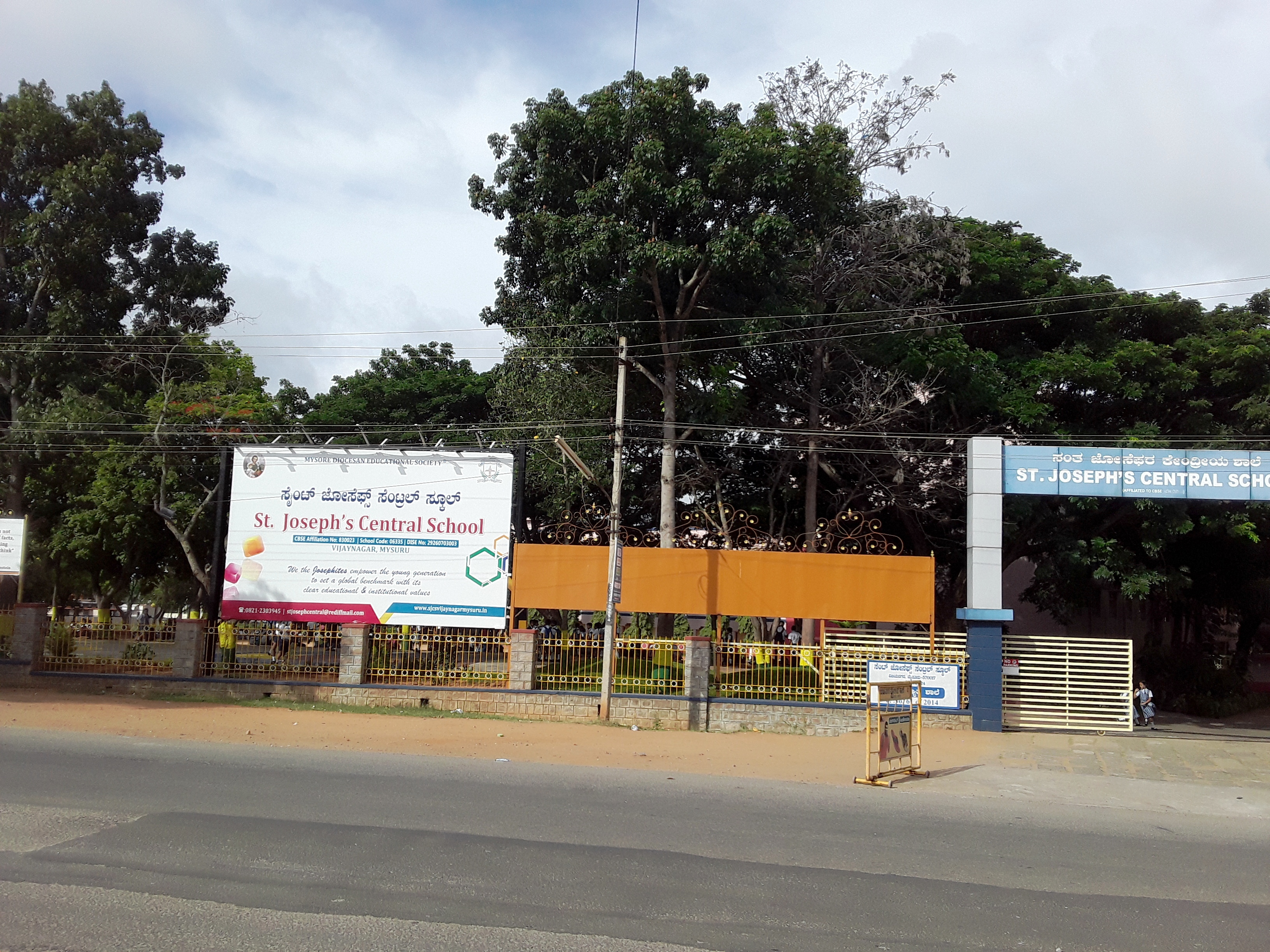
St.Joseph's School
