= R. S. Naidu Nagar =

Suburb of Mysore, India

R.S Naidu Nagar Naidu Nagar
- Nickname: RS Naidu Nagar
- Location within Karnataka Location within India
- Coordinates: 12.35149°N 76.64535°E
- Country: India
- State: Karnataka
- District: Mysuru
- Time zone: UTC+5:30 (IST)
- PIN: 570007
- Vehicle registration: KA-55

R. S. Naidu Nagar is a suburb in the northern side of Mysore. The local language spoken here is Kannada.

== Bus Station ==
KSRTC has built a special bus station for this locality. The residential quarters for the government officials of Mysore are mostly located in Naidu Nagar.

== Infant Jesus Church ==
Infant Jesus Shrine is located at Pushpashrama in Naidu Nagar some five kilometres from Mysore palace. The gateway of the church stands 30 feet high. There is a grotto on the right side containing a life-sized statue of Infant Jesus. The church is built in an octagonal diamond shape with granite stone. There are three huge teakwood doors to enter the church. There are carvings of St. Teresa and St. John on the right side door. The left side entrance has carvings of St. Theresa and St. Edith Stein. The altar has a globe and a tree. The church has fourteen stained windows decorated with beautiful pictures. There is a small chapel on the back of the church on the mezzanine floor.

== Veerashaiva Basava Balaga ==
Veerashaiva Basava Balaga, a social organization was started in 2017 to spread the Human value messages of 12th Century Social reformer Basaveshwara in R.S. Naidu Nagar. It was inaugurated by MP Pratap Simha at a programme held at the ground near Nagalingeshwara Temple.

== Image gallery ==
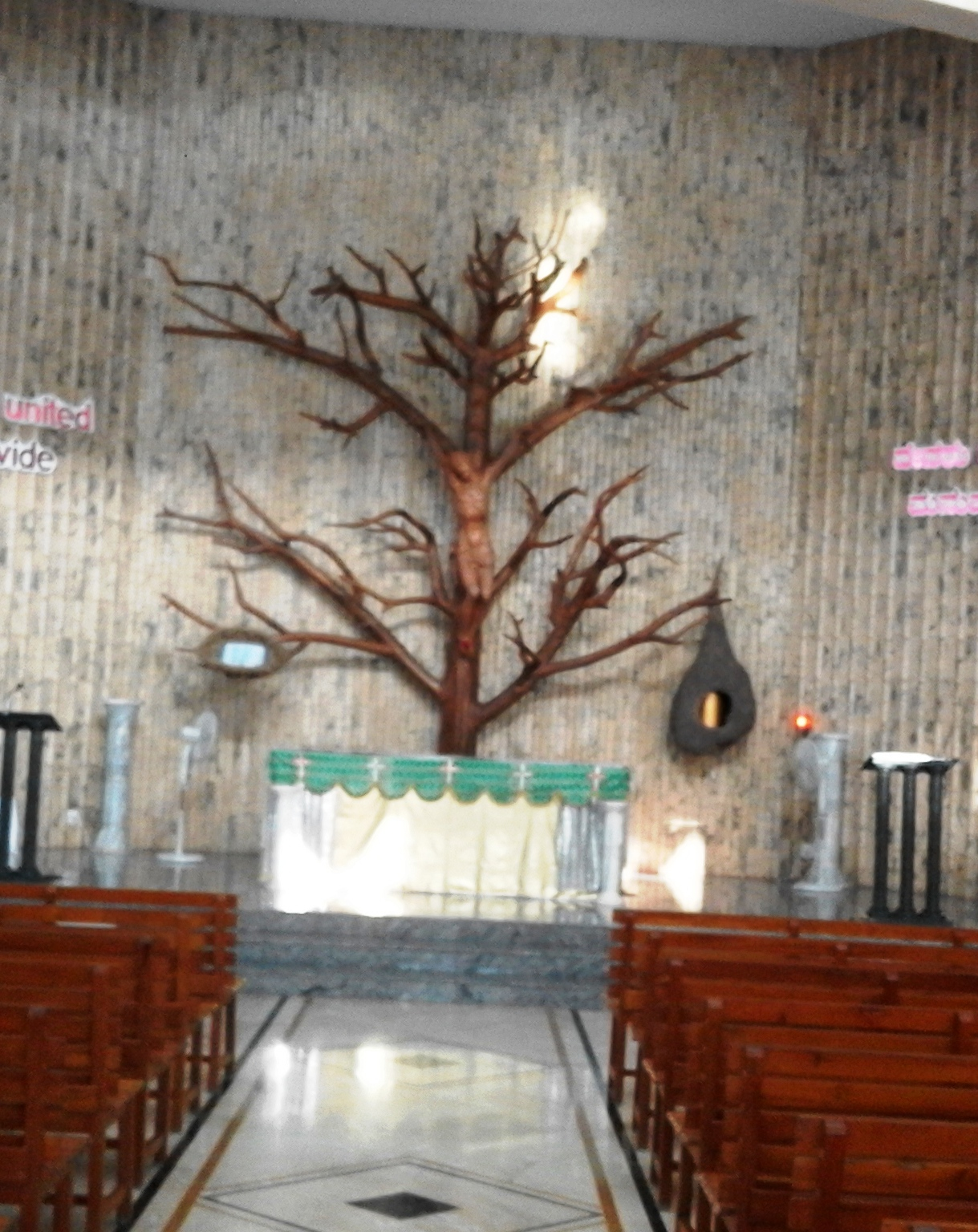
Infant Jesus Church

== See also ==
- Mysore North
- Hebbal, Mysore
- Mandi Mohalla
- St. Philomena's Cathedral, Mysore
- Hale Kesare
- Hanumanthanagar
- Mandi Mohalla
- Vijayanagar
