= Karunapura =

Suburb of Mysore city, India

Coordinates: 12.323692059054965°N 76.66293468922038°E

Karunapura is a suburb of Mysore city in Karnataka state, India.

== History ==
Karunapura was established by the Wesleyan Missionaries in 1898 pestilence in Mysuru. The people who lived near Veeranagere when deadly plague took many lives at the end of 19th century. The Maharaja decided to move them from the highly insanitary and infectious area to a better place by offering the poor vacant sites on the outskirts. Rev. Holdsworth, in whose wife's name stands the popular Holdsworth Memorial Hospital, now governed by Church of South India, were granted a piece of land and settlement was named as Karunapura, meaning the City of Mercy.

== Location ==
Located between Veeranagere, Narasimharaja Mohalla, Gayathripuram is one of the old localities in Mysore.
