= Gayathripuram =

Coordinates: 12.322615655460954°N 76.66792096395413°E

Gayathripuram is a locality of Mysore, city in South Indian state of Karnataka, India.

== Location ==
Located between Veeranagere, Narasimharaja Mohalla, Gandhinagar and Kanteerava Narasimharaja Pura, Gayathripuram is one of the localities formed during Maharaja's rule.
