= Kesare =

- village
- Country: India
- State: Karnataka
- District: Mysore
- Talukas: Mysore

Government
  - Type: Panchayat raj
  - Body: Gram panchayat

Population (2001)
  - Total: 5,289

Languages
  - Official: Kannada
- Time zone: UTC+5:30 (IST)
- ISO 3166 code: IN-KA
- Vehicle registration: KA
- Website: karnataka.gov.in

Kesare is a village in the southern state of Karnataka, India. It is located in the Mysore taluk of Mysore district.

== Demographics ==
As of 2001 India census, Kesare had a population of 5289 with 2696 males and 2593 females.

== See also ==
- Mysore
- Districts of Karnataka
- Hale Kesare
