= Belagola =

Belagola Mandya Belgola
- village
- Location in Karnataka, India
- Coordinates: 12°23′29″N 76°36′35″E
- Country: India
- State: Karnataka
- District: Mandya
- Talukas: Shrirangapattana

Government
  - Body: Grama Panchayath

Area
  - Total: 14.71 km^{2} (5.68 sq mi)
- Elevation: 780 m (2,560 ft)

Population (2011)
  - Total: 10,122
  - Density: 688.1/km^{2} (1,782/sq mi)

Languages
  - Official: Kannada
- Time zone: UTC+5:30 (IST)
- PIN: 571606
- Vehicle registration: KA-11
- Nearest city: Mysore
- Lok Sabha constituency: Mandya Lok Sabha constituency
- Vidhan Sabha constituency: Shrirangapattana Assembly constituency

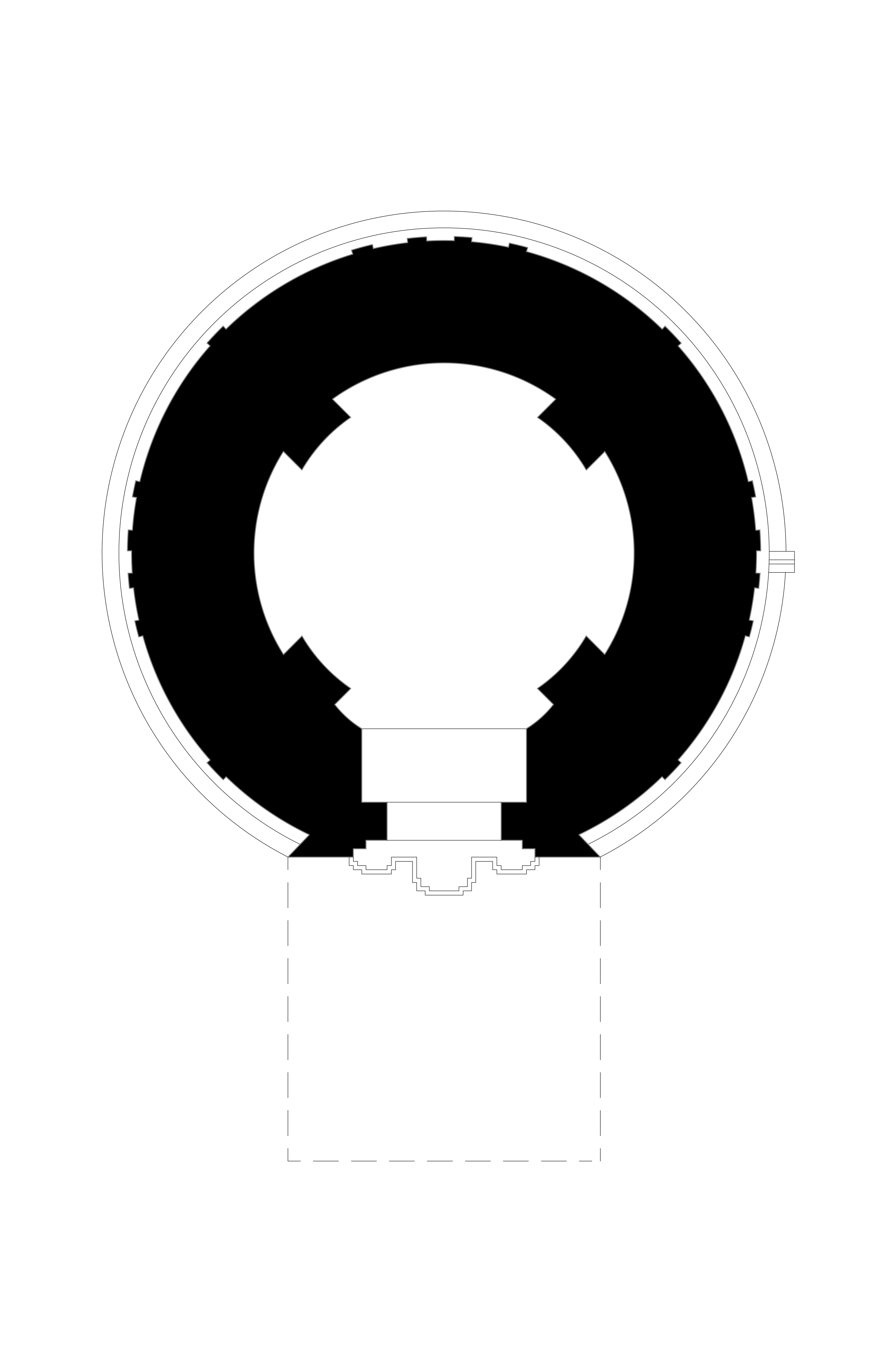
Floor plan of the Bhaktavatsala temple in Belagola, Narasimha in a round sanctum.

Belagola , sometimes referred to as Mandya Belagola to distinguish it from Shravana Belagola, is a village in the southern state of Karnataka, India. It is located about 15 kilometers north-northwest of Mysuru city in the Shrirangapattana taluk of Mandya district in Karnataka. It is around 7 km from famous K.R.S Dam.

The village has several temple of which two are historically important and close to each other – the Bhaktavatsala temple and the Janardhana temple. The Bhaktavatsala temple is notable for its circular sanctum plan, one among the few such plans seen in South India.

As of 2001 India census, Belagola had a population of 9216 with 4644 males and 4572 females.

== See also ==
- Mandya
- Districts of Karnataka
