= Hale Kesare =

Coordinates: 12.355131°N 76.670093°E

Hale Kesare is a small village in Mysore district of Karnataka state in India.

== Location ==
Hale Kesare village is located immediately north of the ring road near R.S.Naidu Nagar satellite bus station, Mysore Towards Teachers Layout Nagunahalli Road

== Education ==
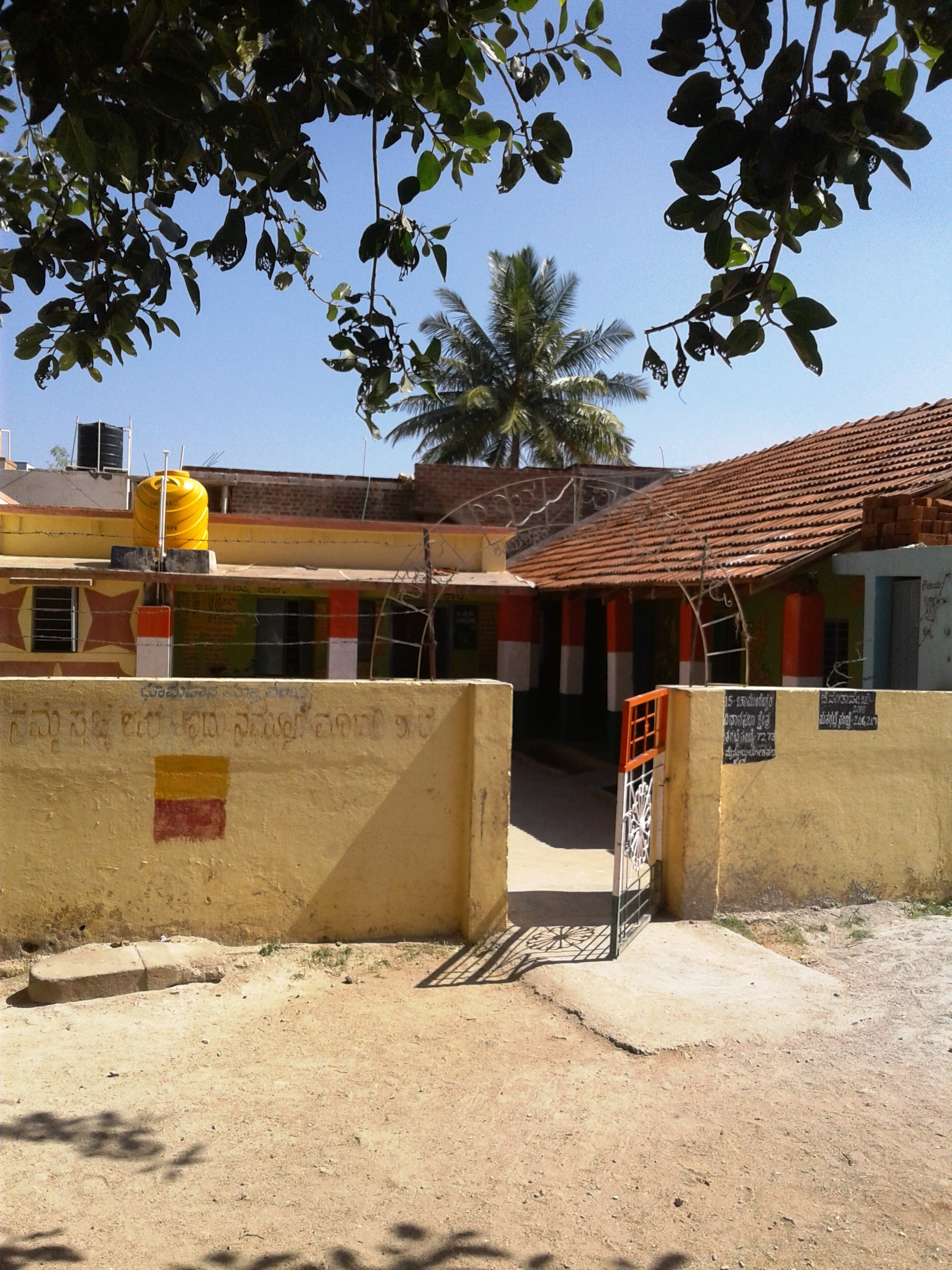
Kamalikere School

- Flos Carmeli ICSE School.
- Government Primary School, Hale Kesare.
- Hale Kesare Anganvadi.

== Post Office ==
There is a post office at Hale Kesare and the PIN code is 570003 It comes under Note Mudrana Nagar

== Landmarks ==
Hale Kesare village has surrounded by Teachers Layout, BMR Layout, Mathrusree Layout, Vittal Layout Adjacent villages Siddlingapura a big lake called KamanaKere. The end of the village is Kamana Kere Hundi and this point is marked by a square where bus No.150.AB turns back to the city bus station. There is a primary school in this location.

== Transportation ==
Hale Kesare village is about one kilometre north of the Ring Road circling Mysore city. It is two kilometres from R.S.Naidu satellite bus station. Direct buses are also available from Mysore city bus station every half an hour (Bus No.150.AB). The nearest railway station is Mysore.

== See also ==
- Mandi Mohalla
- St. Philomena's Cathedral, Mysore
- Hanumanthanagar
- Belagola
- Kesare
- Mysore North, Naidu Nagar
