= Hanumanthanagar, Mysuru =

Hanumanth Nagar Hanumanthanagara
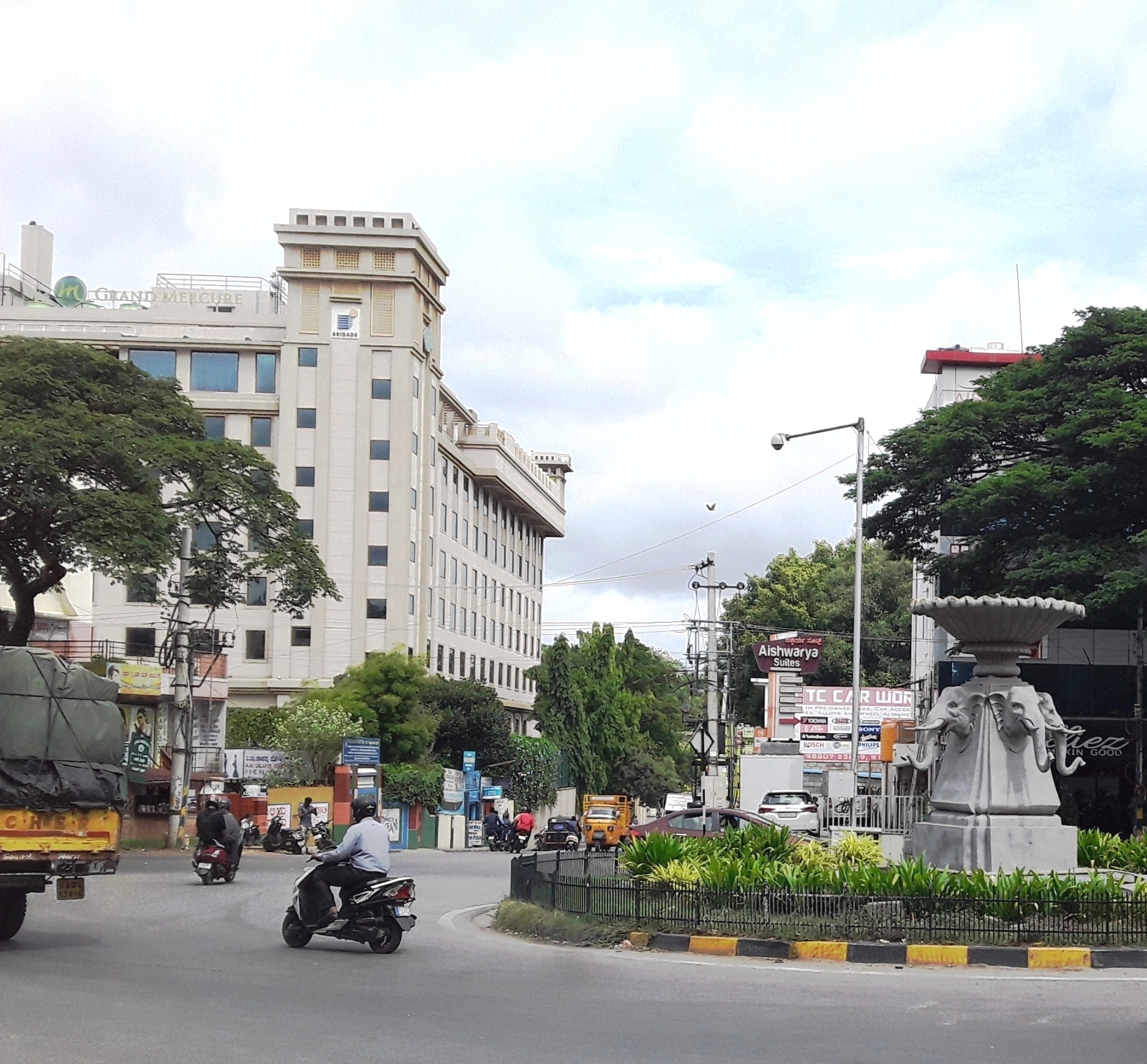
- Highway Circle in Hanumanthanagar, Bannimantap
- Interactive map of Hanumanth Nagar
- Coordinates: 12.340401°N 76.651979°E
- Country: India
- State: Karnataka
- District: Mysore
- Time zone: UTC+5:30 (IST)
- PIN: 570015
- Telephone code: 0821
- Vehicle registration: KA-55

Hanumanthanagar is a locality in Bannimantap, a suburb of Mysore coming on the Northern side of the city. It is part of Mysore district in Karnataka state of India. Hanumanth Nagar is famous for the Jumbo Savari with the golden Howdah, a part of Mysore Dasara, which marks an end of the procession in Bannimantap via Highway Circle of Hanumanth Nagar.

== Etymology ==
The name comes from Sri Veeranjaneyaswamy Temple in the aea

== Landmarks ==
- Highway Circle
- Nalapad Residency
- Bannimantap Parade Grounds
- Karnataka Gramin Bank (formerly known as Kaveri Grameena Bank)

== Transportation ==
From the Mysore city bus stand to Hanumanthanagar buses are available.

Nearby bus stops at HUDCO Layout.

== See also ==
- Bannimantap Parade Grounds
- Naidu Nagar
- Hebbal
- Hale Kesare
- Mandi Mohalla
