= Mandi Mohalla =

Suburb of Mysore, India

Coordinates: 12.316270°N 76.654037°E

Mandi Mohalla or Laskhar Mohalla is a suburb of Mysore city in Karnataka state of India.

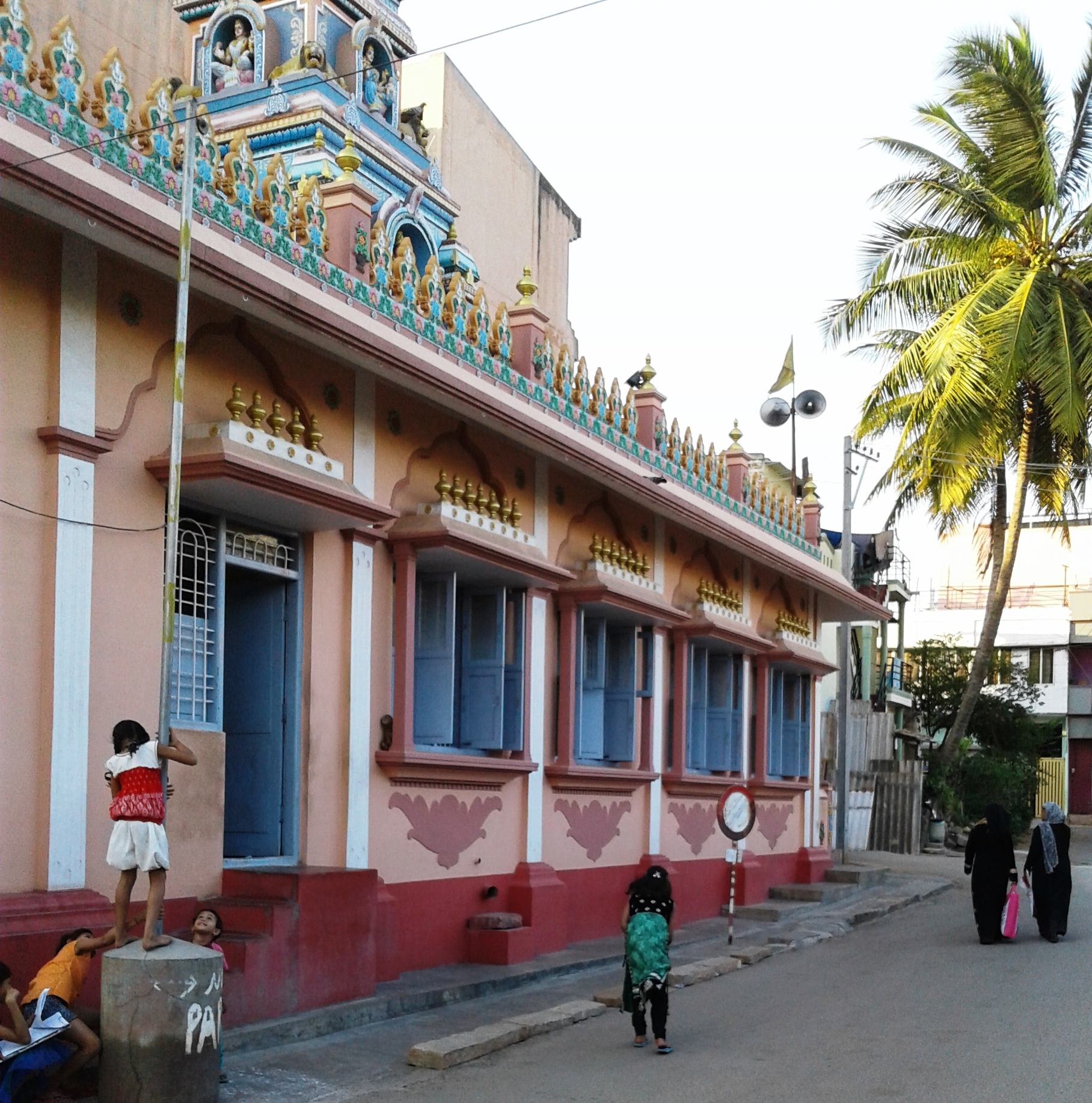
Hindu temple on Ashoka Road

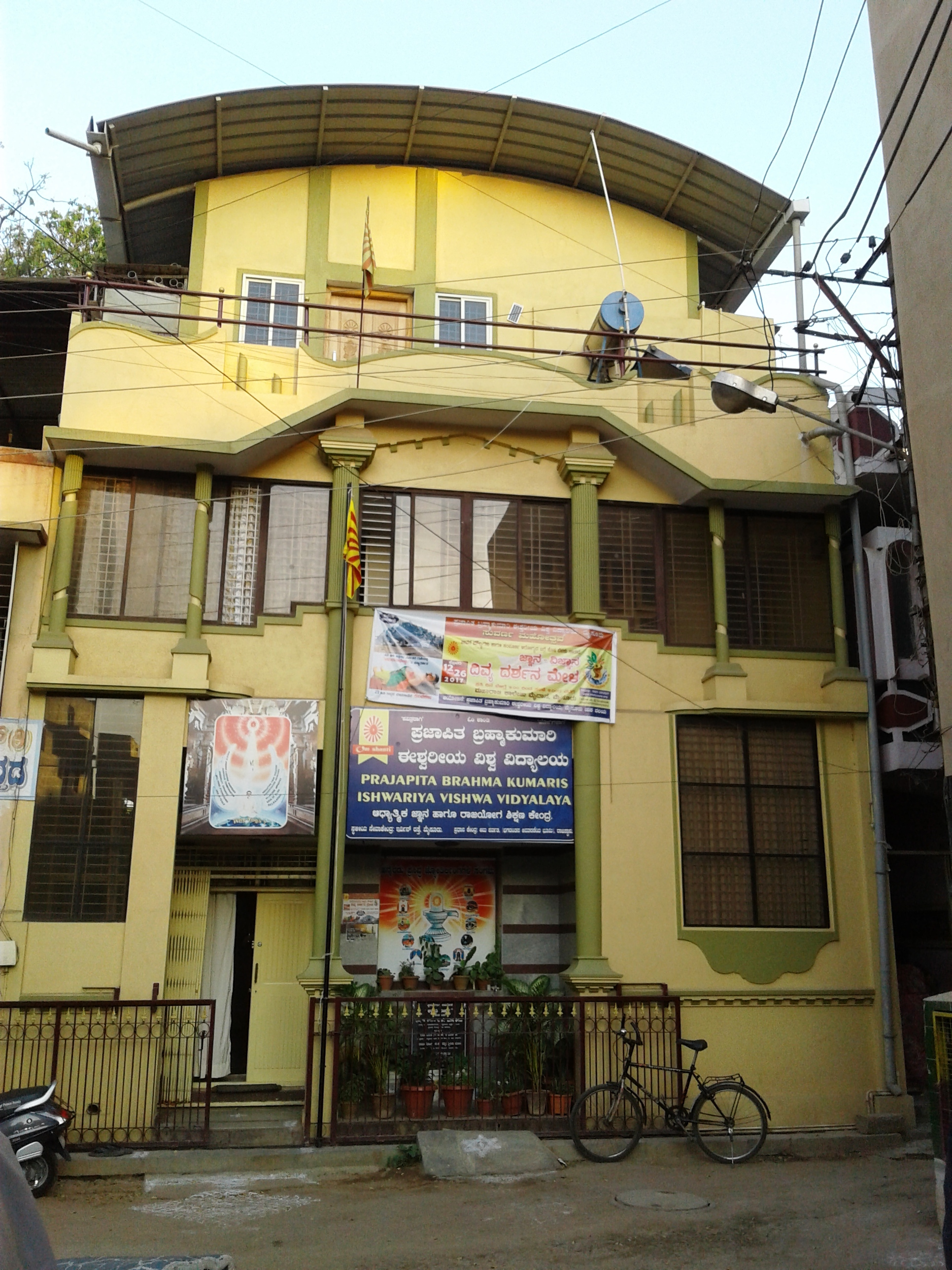
Brahmakumari Temple, Mandi Mohalla

== Location ==
Mandi Mohalla township is located in the downtown area of Mysore city. It is on the eastern side of Mysore Junction railway station and on the northern side of Mysore bus station. The southern boundary of Mandi Mohalla is the Irwin Road and northern end is Bannimantap, There are many masjid in the area, most famous being Masjid E Azam built in 1925 situated in Ashoka Road, Jamiya Masjid built in 1927 situated on Irwin Road, Dargahi masjid builded in late 1950's or 60's in Sawday Road. Mysore's oldest graveyard dating back to 16th century is present here, there are graves from time immemorial, which proves muslims are settled here from a very long time, they graveyard spread across 56 acres, consists on many graves including those of sufi saints

== Economy ==
Mandi Mohalla is kind of second hand market popular for mobile telephones, accessories and repair shops. Fake CDs and duplicate electronic products are often sold here. Crime rate is very high in Mandi Mohalla and is considered the most crime prone area of Mysore. There is a separate police station here.

== Post Office ==
There is a post office at Mandi Mohalla and the postal code is 570021. The main roads in Mandi Mohalla are Ashoka Road, Geetha Road and the K.T.Street. The main tourist attraction is the St. Philomena's Cathedral, Mysore.

== Important Streets ==
- Kali Temple Street
- Kabir Road
- Akbar Road Cross
- Ashoka Road
- Sawday Road
- Turabali Street
- Pulikeshi Road
- Anegundi Road
- Cove Road
- Erekette Street
- Eshwari Temple Road
- Benki Nawab Street
- Sir Khazi Road
- Mahmood Khan Dawood Khan Road
- Sunni Chowk

== Image gallery ==
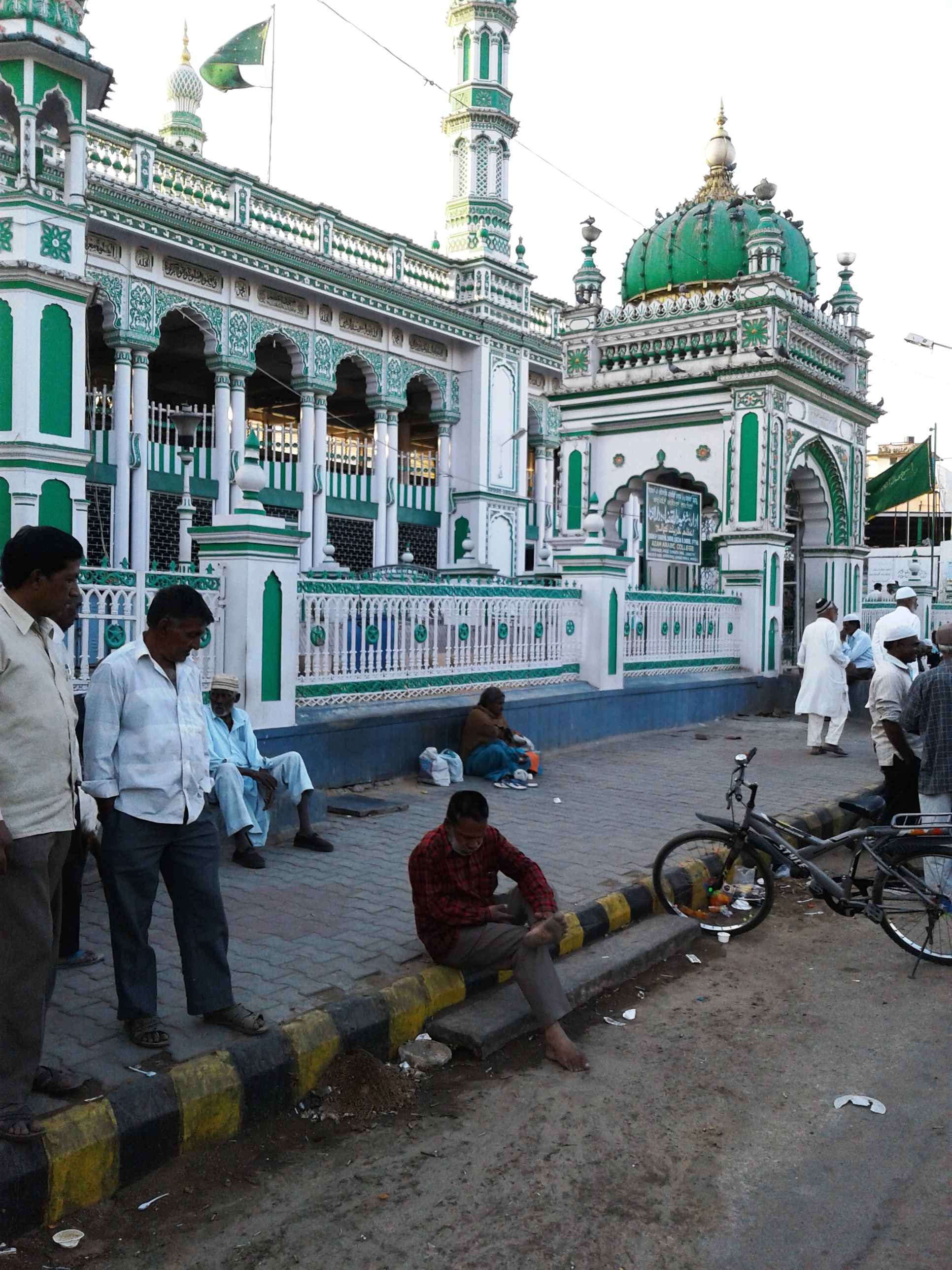
Masjid e Azam

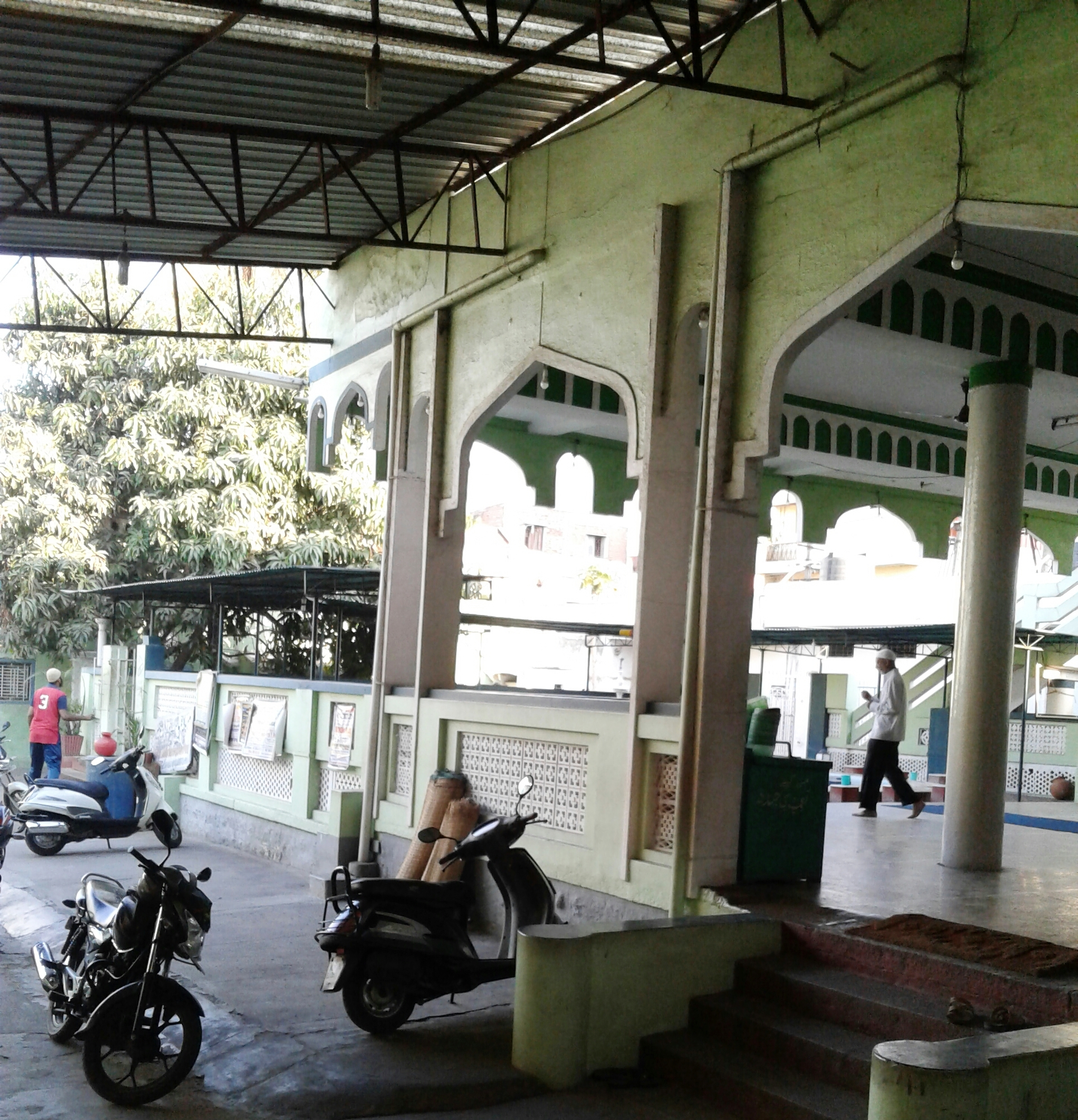
Jamia Masjid, Irwin Road

== See also ==
- Devaraj Urs Road, Mysore
- Dewan's Road, Mysore
- Hanumanthanagar
- Mysore North, Naidu Nagar
- St. Philomena's Cathedral, Mysore
- St. Philomena's College, Mysore
