= Hebbal, Mysore =

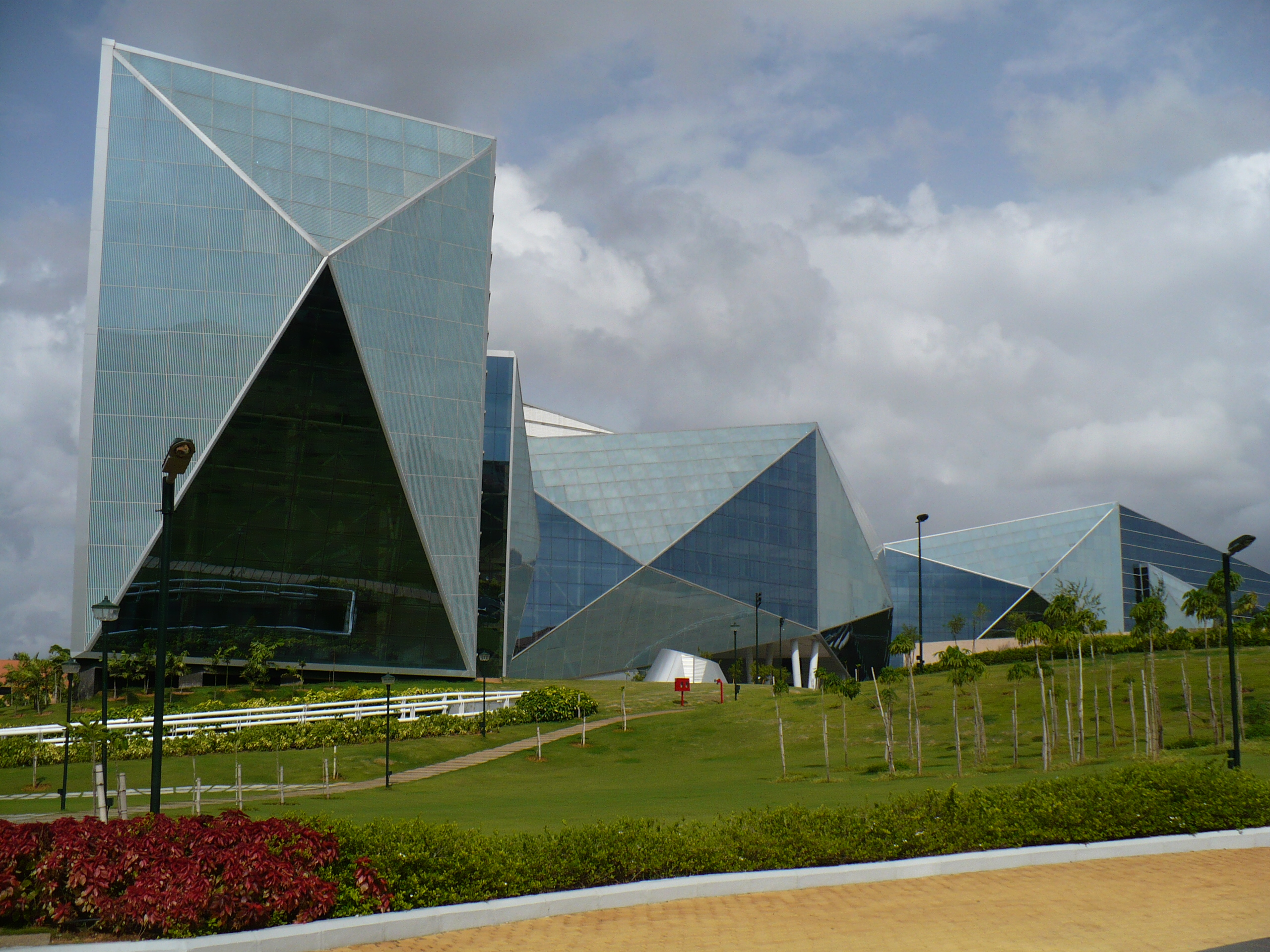
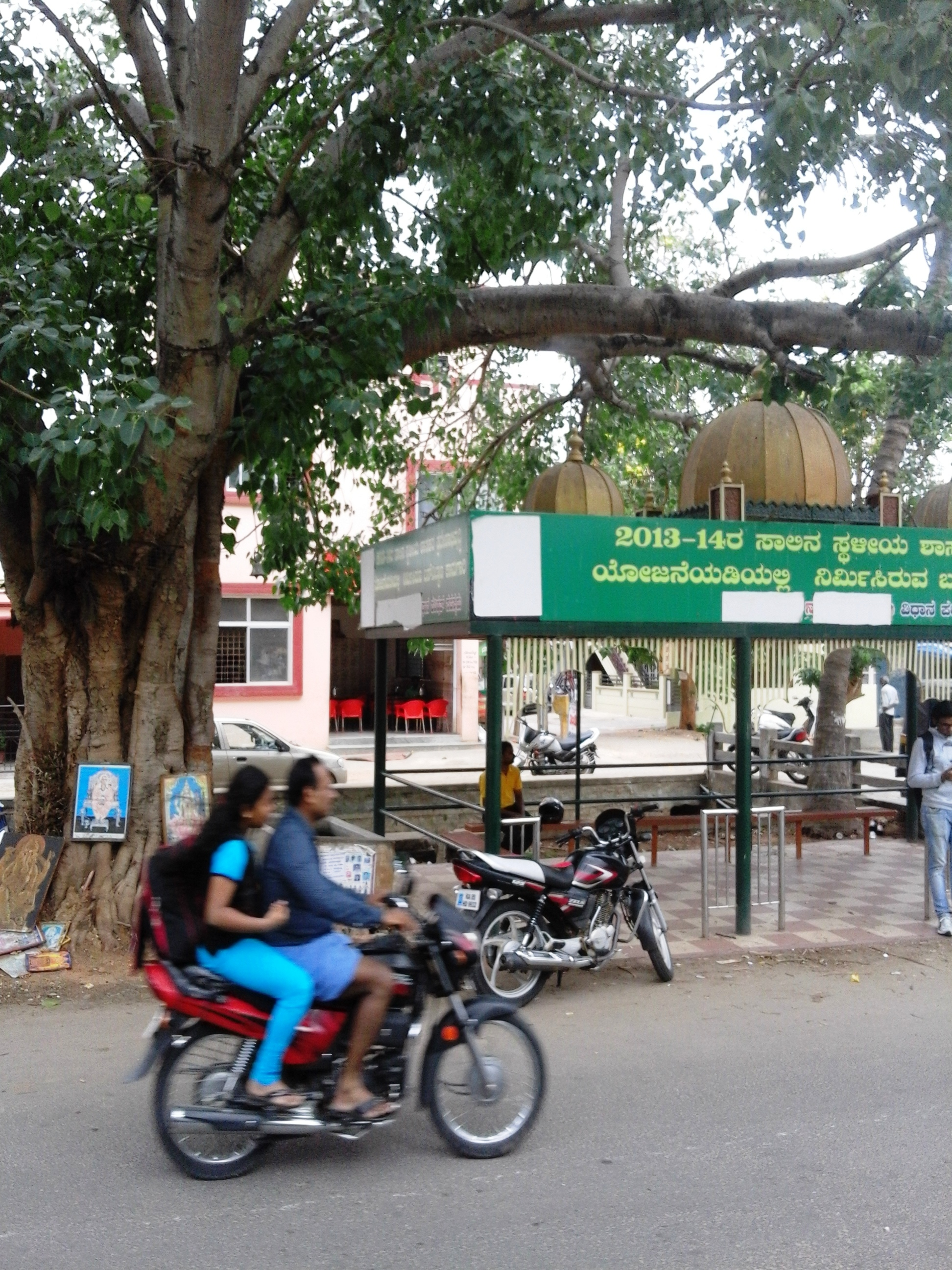
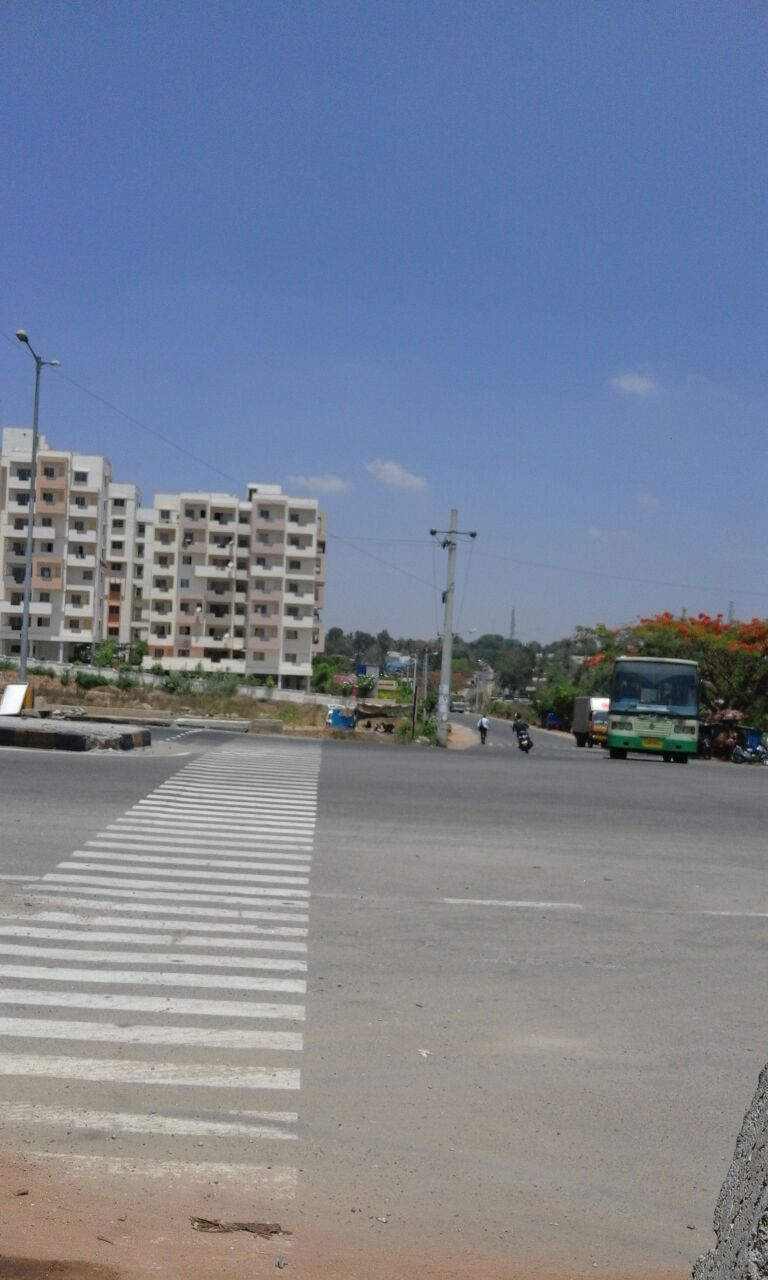
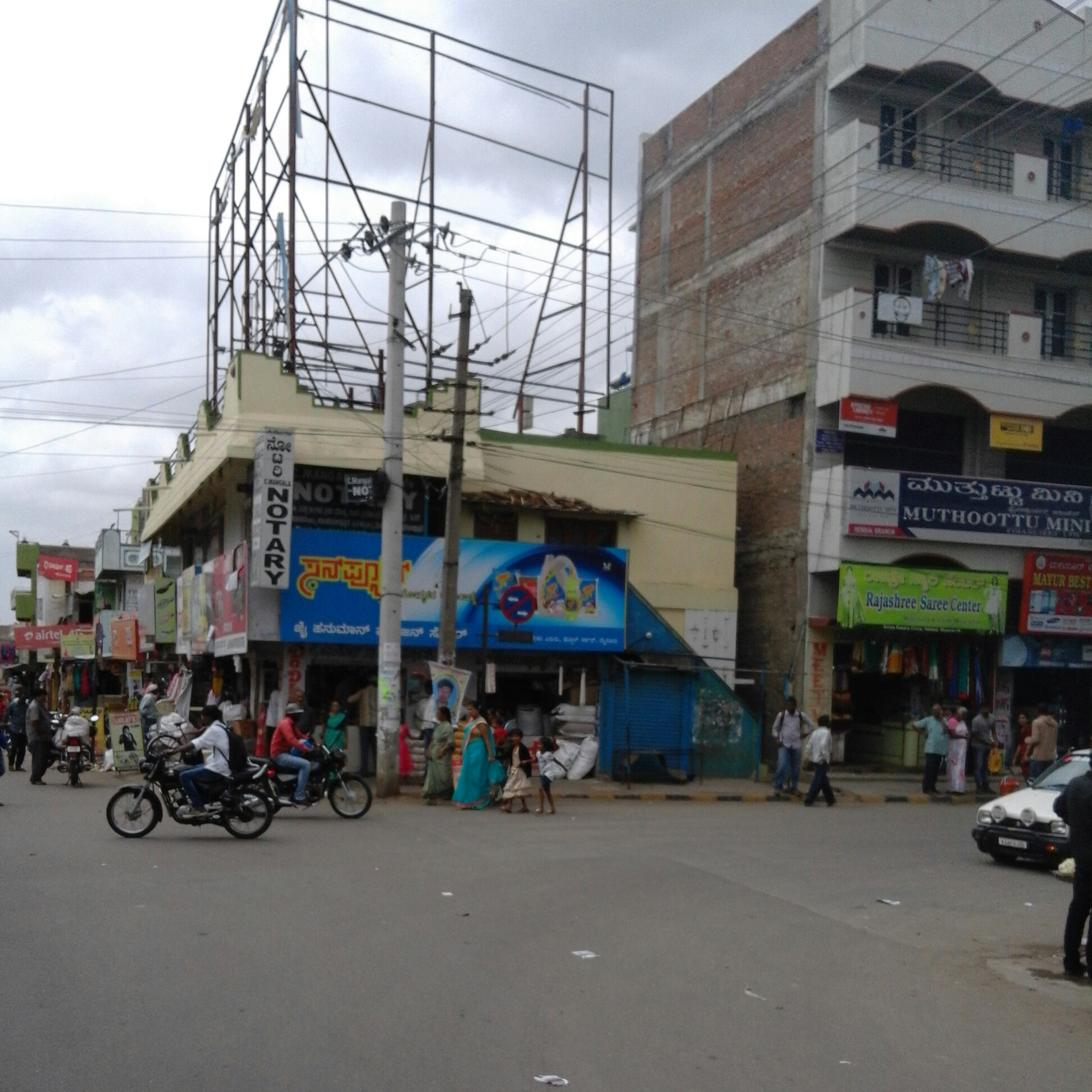
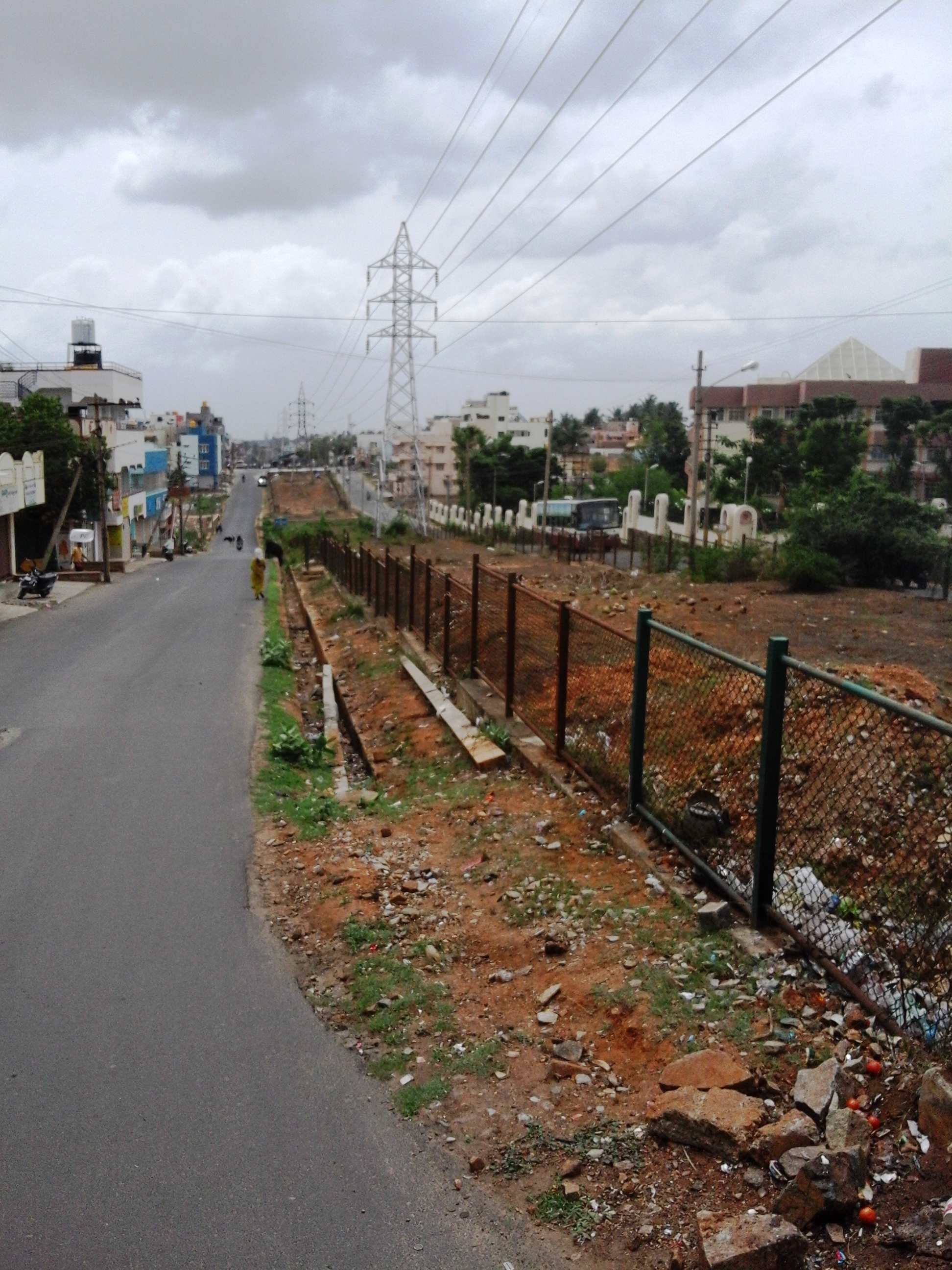
- Hebbal, Mysore
- Interactive map of Hebbal, Mysore
- Coordinates: 12.36180°N 76.60003°E
- Country: India
- State: Karnataka

Hebbal is an industrial area and suburb of Mysore city in India.

== History ==
Traditionally, Mysore has been home to industries such as weaving, sandalwood carving, bronzework, and the production of lime and salt. The planned industrial growth of the city and the state was first envisaged in the Mysore economic conference, held in 1911. This led to the establishment of industries such as the Mysore Sandalwood Oil Factory in 1917 and the Sri Krishnarajendra Mills in 1920.

== Demographics ==
As of 2001 India census, Hebbalu had a population of 1471. Males constitute 52% of the population and females 48%. Hebbalu has an average literacy rate of 71%, higher than the national average of 59.5%: male literacy is 72%, and female literacy is 71%.

== Industrial suburb ==
In a survey conducted in 2001 by Business Today, the business arm of India Today, Mysore was ranked the fifth-best city in India in which to conduct business and the second-cleanest city in India, where only Chandigarh ranked cleaner. Mysore has emerged as the hub of the tourism industry in Karnataka, attracting about 2.5 million tourists in 2006. National Parks 40–60 miles to the south include Bandipur National Park and Mudumalai National Park sanctuary for gaur, chital, elephants as well as Bengal tigers, Indian leopards and other threatened species.

For the industrial development of the city, the Karnataka Industrial Areas Development Board (KIADB) has established four industrial areas in and around Mysore and are located in Belagola, Belawadi, Hebbal (Electronic City) and Hootagalli areas. The major industries in Mysore include BEML, J. K. Tyres, Wipro, SPI, Falcon Tyres, L & T, Theorem India pvt Ltd and Infosys.

Since 2003, information technology companies have been creating bases in Mysore, with the city contributing Rs. 1100 crores (US$220 million) to Karnataka's IT exports in the financial year 2007–2008. Infosys has established one of the largest technical training centres in the world and Wipro has established its Global Service Management Center (GSMC) at Mysore. Non-IT related services have been outsourced from other countries to companies in Mysore.

== Lulls in development ==
The industrial sector in the city experienced setbacks when the automobile manufacturer Ideal Jawa and the Sri Krishnarajendra Mills closed their operations. Revival efforts, such as the takeover of the Krishnarajendra Mills by the Atlantic Spinning and Weaving Mills Ltd. have been made, but these attempts have run into other problems.

In 2011, Infosys built a 21,417-square-metre (230,530 sq ft) fire station at Hebbal at a cost of ₹ 4.5 crore for the Karnataka Fire and Emergency Services department.

== See also ==
- Hebbal Lake, Mysore
