= Vivekananda Institute, Mysore =

Vivekananda Institute for Leadership Development
- Affiliations: Mysore University
- Principal: Dr. Ramaswami Balasubramaniam
- Location: Mysore, Karnataka, India; 12.35438°N 76.61368°E
- Website: Official website

V-Lead, Mysore

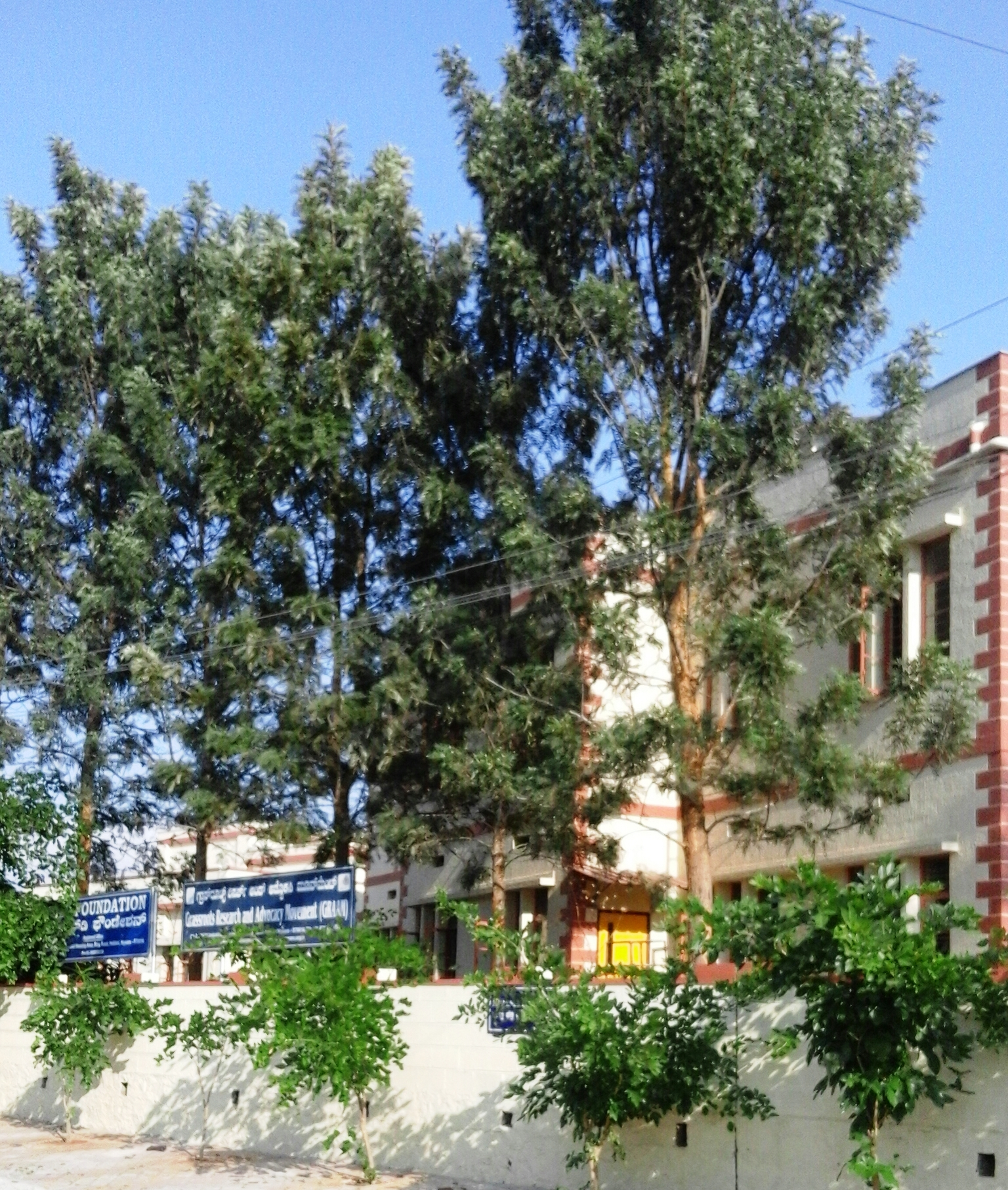
Vivekananda Institute for Leadership Development

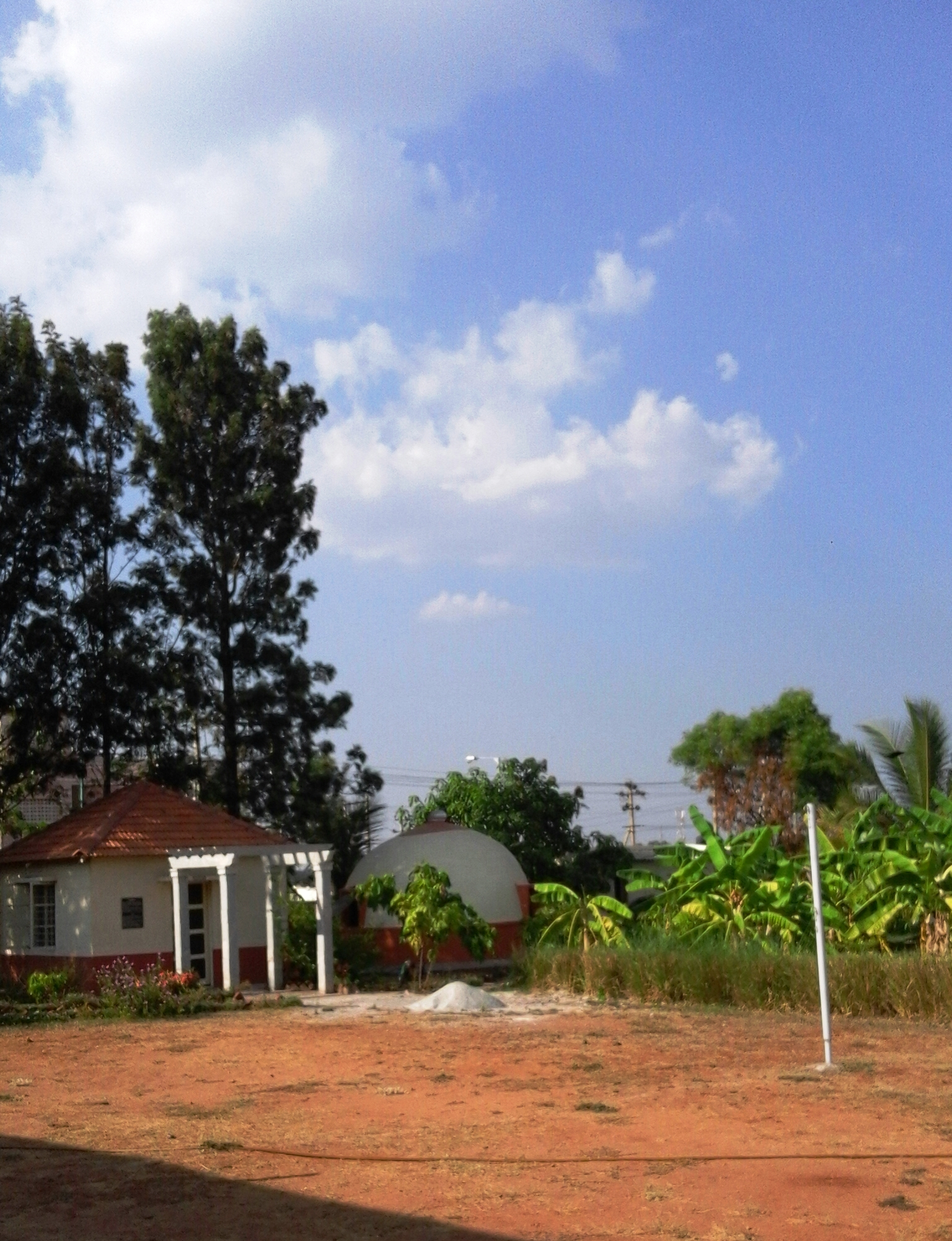
Backyard of V.Lead is very green

Vivekananda Institute for Leadership Development or V-Lead is an international research and training organisation under Swami Vivekananda Youth Movement, Saragur, India.

== The Mission ==
Vivekananda Institute for Leadership Development (V-LEAD), an initiative of Swami Vivekananda Youth Movement was established in 2002 with the mission of developing human and social capital for nation building under the training, research, advocacy and consultancy sector of SVYM. The TRAC activities of the organisation are guided by Dr. Ramaswami Balasubramaniam, Founder SVYM, a Harvard scholar and a social activist based in India.

== Academic Programmes Offered ==
- MDM Master in Development Management (Mysore University)

== Training Programmes ==
- Training to young on development issues
- Training to Non-profit organisations
- Training to government officers
- Training to corporates on Leadership/community led development.

== Community Based Programmes ==
- Voters' Awareness Programmes.
- Samudaya Jagruthi samithis
- Mass Awareness programme
- Right to Information activism
- Citizen participation committees
- Rural interventions in village sanitation drives
- Capacity Building for Monitoring committees
- Gramavani village News Letter

== Collaborations ==
Vivekananda Institute is collaborating with the following organisations for conducting various training programs:

- Administrative Training Institute, Mysore.
- University of Mysore.
- Azim Premji University, Bangalore
- State Institute for Rural Development, Mysore.
- JSS Group of Institute, Karnataka.
- Asha for Education,
- Infosys Technologies, Mysore.
- British Council, India.

== Visit of the U.S.Ambassador ==
The US Ambassador to India Mr. Richard Verma visited Vivekananda Institute on 1 April 2015. He interacted with the students of the Master in Development Management at Vivekananda Institute for Leadership Development (V-LEAD).

== See also ==
- Hebbal, Mysore
- List of educational institutions in Mysore
