= List of educational institutions in Mysore =

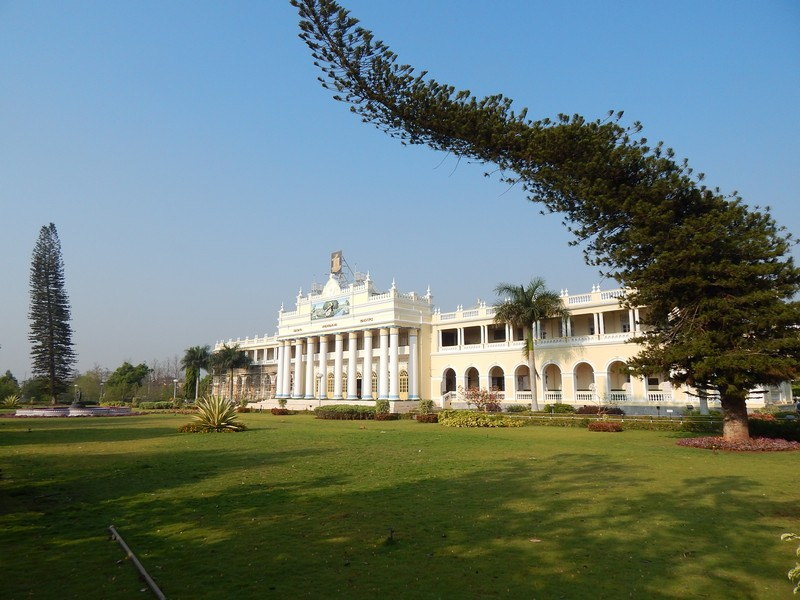
University of Mysore

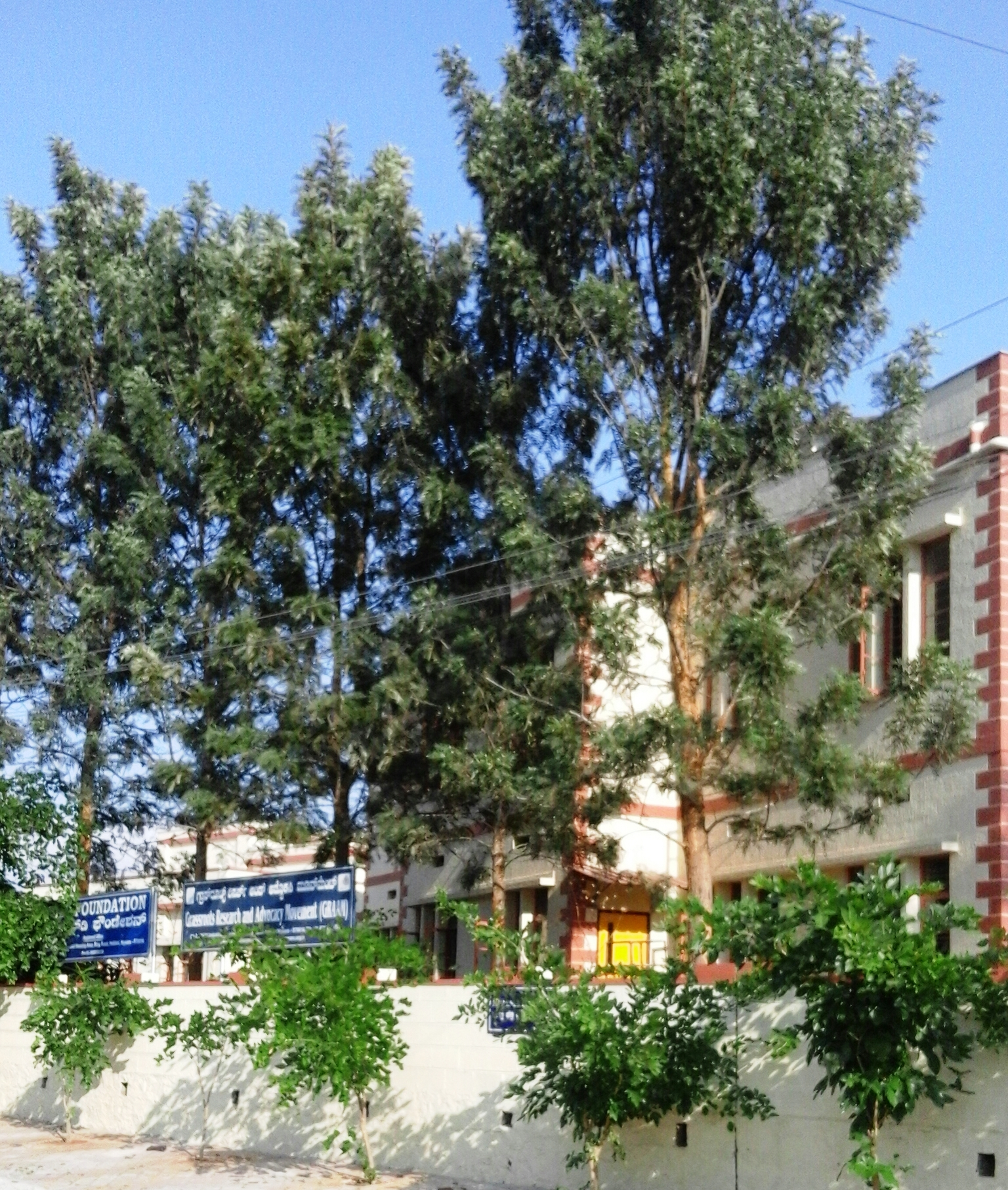
Vivekananda Institute, Hebbal, Mysore

Mysore city in Karnataka, India has become an educational hub because of good weather and a cheaper cost of living. A large number of students from different parts of India and a few hundreds of students from foreign countries live and study here. Mysore ranks 5th among Indian cities that attracts foreign students. Students from 52 countries study here for undergraduate and post-graduate courses. Around 1,000 students arrive in Mysore every year for higher studies. Most of the foreign students are from Iran, Afghanistan, China, Maldives and different parts of Africa.

== Universities ==
- University of Mysore
- Jagadguru Sri Shivarathreeswara University
- Karnataka State Music University, Mysore
- Karnataka State Open University
- Amrita University

== Colleges and institutes ==
- Institute of Management Development, Mysuru (IMD)
- Hindustan First Grade College, Mysore
- All India Institute of Speech and Hearing, Mysore
- Vivekananda Institute, Mysore
- Seshadripuram Degree College, Mysore
- Sarada Vilas College
- JSS College of Pharmacy
- Vidya Vardhaka College of Engineering
- Maharaja Institute of Technology Mysore
- National Institute of Engineering
- Maharaja's College, Mysore
- St. Philomena's College, Mysore
- Sri Jayachamarajendra College of Engineering
- Mysore Medical College & Research Institute
- Chamarajendra Academy of Visual Arts
- Vidya Vikas Institute of Engineering & Technology
- Government Ayurveda Medical College and Hospital, Mysore
- Regional Institute of Education, Mysore

== Schools ==
- Christ Public School Bogadi CBSE
- Christ School Thandavapura CBSE
- Kaliyuva Mane
- CFTRI School, Mysore
- Demonstration School, Mysore
- Parkinson Memorial School
- Atomic Energy Central School
- St. Joseph's High School, Mysore
- Marimallappa High School
- Sri Ramakrishna Vidyashala
- Sadvidya Pathashala
- Pramati Hillview Academy
- The Learning Curve International School, Mysore
