= Saraguru =

Saraguru may refer to:

- Saragur, Mysore district, Karnataka, India
- Saragooru Nanjangud, Mysore district, Karnataka, India
