= R Balasubramaniam =

Indian writer and activist

Dr Ramaswami Balasubramaniam (Balu)
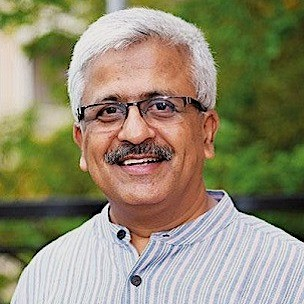
- Born: Bengaluru, Karnataka, India
- Education: MBBS from Mysore Medical College, Mysuru; MPhil in Hospital and Health Systems Management at Birla Institute of Technology and Science; Masters in Public Administration (MPA) at John F. Kennedy School of Government, Harvard University; Mason Fellow, 2009-10; Doctor of Philosophy, PhD in Leadership and Management
- Office: Full-time Member, NITI Aayog (May 2026 - Present); Chairman, Social Stock Exchange Advisory Committee, Securities and Exchange Board of India (SEBI) (2022 - Present); Former Member - Human Resources, Capacity Building Commission, Government of India (April 2021 to April 2026)
- Website: drrbalu.com

R Balasubramaniam, (also known as Dr Balu), is an Indian development practitioner and public policy academic. Since May 2026, he has been a full-time member of NITI Aayog, the Government of India's policy think tank. He founded the Swami Vivekananda Youth Movement (SVYM) in 1984, and the Grassroots Research and Advocacy Movement (GRAAM) in 2011, both based in Mysuru, Karnataka.

A physician by training, he holds a Master in Public Administration from the Harvard Kennedy School and was previously the Frank H T Rhodes professor at Cornell University between 2012 and 2014. He previously served as Member - Human Resources of the Capacity Building Commission (CBC) of the Government of India from April 2021 to April 2026. He has written several books on development, governance, and leadership, and has delivered lectures on adaptive leadership and public policy at institutions in India and abroad. His latest book is Power Within: The Leadership Legacy of Narendra Modi published in 2024.

== Early life and education ==
R. Balasubramaniam was born in Bengaluru, Karnataka, India. He studied medicine at Mysore Medical College, Mysuru, graduating with an MBBS degree. He subsequently completed an MPhil in Hospital Administration and Health Systems Management from the Birla Institute of Technology and Science (BITS), Pilani. In 2009, he enrolled at the John F Kennedy School of Government, Harvard University, where he was a Mason Fellow, completing a Master in Public Administration (MPA) in 2010. In December 2025, he was awarded a PhD in Leadership and Management.

== Career ==
=== Civil society and development work ===
In 1984, Balasubramaniam founded the Swami Vivekananda Youth Movement (SVYM). SVYM is a development organisation working in the Saragur and Heggadadevana Kote taluks of Mysuru district, Karnataka, focused on health, education, and community development among rural and tribal communities.

In January and March 1998, Balasubramaniam petitioned the National Human Rights Commission of India on behalf of 154 tribal families in N. Begur, H.D. Kote Taluk of Mysuru district, who had been displaced by the construction of the Kabini Reservoir in the 1970s and the establishment of Bandipur Tiger Reserve. The NHRC conducted hearings, commissioned a field inspection by a Special Rapporteur, and in August 1998 recommended restoration of the tribal communities' land. The Government of Karnataka subsequently accepted the Commission's recommendations and withdrew cases that had been filed against the tribal communities. The NHRC continued to monitor implementation of the resettlement at least until 2005.

Through SVYM, Balasubramaniam established programmes in primary and preventive healthcare, drinking water and sanitation, and nutrition for tribal communities in H D Kote and Saragur. As of 2016, SVYM was reported to have a positive impact on more than two million people annually. The organisation has received international recognition for its work, including the Excellence in Primary Health Care Award from the World Health Organization, the Civil Society Award for work in HIV/AIDS prevention from the Joint United Nations Programme on HIV/AIDS (UNAIDS), and the Best NGO in India Award from the Resource Alliance in 2015.

In 2002, he founded the Vivekananda Institute for Leadership Development (VLEAD) in Mysuru, which offers programmes in leadership and community development for civil society organisations, government officials, and students. In 2008, he founded the Vivekananda Institute of Indian Studies (VIIS), also in Mysuru, focused on the study and teaching of Indian philosophy, culture and classical arts.

In 2008, he led a community awareness campaign emphasising the use of the Right to Information Act, 2005 as a tool for civic accountability. The campaign included a padayatra of approximately 350 km across 120 villages in Mysuru district, during which he engaged with an estimated 200,000 people on rights-based governance.

In 2011, he founded the Grassroots Research and Advocacy Movement (GRAAM), a public policy research institute based in Mysuru. GRAAM undertakes research and advocacy on issues of governance, social development, and public policy.

In 2013, he led a voter awareness initiative titled “Making Democracy Work” in Mysuru district, aimed at encouraging informed participation in the electoral process.

=== Academic career ===
Balasubramaniam's association with Cornell University began in 2008, when he was invited to deliver guest lectures at the Cornell University School of Industrial and Labor Relations (ILR School). In 2012, he was appointed as the Frank H. T. Rhodes Professor at Cornell University , a position he held until 2014.

From Fall 2017 to Spring 2024, he served as Visiting Faculty at the Cornell University School of Industrial and Labor Relations (ILR School), where he delivered on Global Leadership and Sustainable Development. During this period, he contributed to the development of the ILR Global Service Learning Summer Program, through which Cornell students undertook fieldwork with SVYM in Karnataka. His contributions to this program were featured among the stories marking the 75th anniversary of the ILR School.

He has also taught leadership courses at IIT Delhi, including delivering lectures and workshops on leadership and public policy at universities and institutions in India and internationally, for senior professionals across sectors.

In 2025, he became a founding mentor of India House , a policy think tank co-founded by alumni and faculty of several IITs.

=== Government and public policy roles ===
Balasubramaniam served as a special investigator to the Karnataka Lokayukta, with responsibility for examining complaints of maladministration and corruption in the health and medical education sectors. Between 2006 and 2011, he investigated corruption-related irregularities in the Public Distribution System in Karnataka. In October 2020, he was appointed to the Technical Group on the Social Stock Exchange (SSE) constituted by the Securities and Exchange Board of India (SEBI). In December 2022, he was appointed as the chairman of the SEBI Social Stock Exchange Advisory Committee.

In April 2021, the Government of India appointed him as Member – Human Resources of the Capacity Building Commission (CBC), a statutory body established under the Mission Karmayogi National Programme for Civil Services Capacity Building to strengthen the institutional capacity of the central civil services. He served in this role until April 2026. In 2024, he was appointed as the Chairperson of the Academic Leadership Committee, University Grants Commission.

In 2025, he was appointed as the Chairperson of the Technical Advisory Committee for the Gross Domestic Knowledge Product (GDKP), Ministry of Statistics and Programme Implementation, Government of India.

In May 2026, he was appointed as a Full-time Member of NITI Aayog, the policy think tank of the Government of India, by Prime Minister Narendra Modi. The appointment, notified by the Cabinet Secretariat, took effect from the date of assumption of charge.

== Works ==
- "Swami Vivekananda: As I See Him (GRAAM, 2014)" [Published in English and Kannada]
- "I, the Citizen (Cornell, 2015)" [Published in English and Hindi]
- "Voices from the Grassroots (GRAAM, 2018)" [Published in English and Hindi]
- "Leadership Lessons for Daily Living" (GRAAM, 2020)
- "Power Within: The Leadership Legacy Of Narendra Modi" (Penguin Random House India, 2024)
- "The Inner Charioteer: Lessons from the Bhagavad Gita for Purposeful and Effective Leadership" (Penguin Random House India, 2026)

== Awards and Honours ==
- 1988: State Youth Award, Government of Karnataka
- 2003: Jayendra Saraswathi Award, Kanchi Kamakoti Peetham, for contributions to social work
- 2011: India Pride Award, Dainik Bhaskar group, for social development work
- 2014: Vivekananda Award for Human Excellence, Ramakrishna Mission
- 2014: Swasthya Seva Ratna Award, Society for Indian Medical Anthropology, for outstanding medical service to indigenous tribal communities
- 2014: Distinguished Alumni Award, Mysuru Medical College and Research Institute, Centenary Year
- 2016: Distinguished Alumni Award, University of Mysuru, Centenary Year
- 2021: Recognised by Cornell University's Merrill Presidential Scholars as the faculty member who contributed most significantly to their Cornell experience
- 2024: Doctor of Letters (Honoris Causa), Nrupathunga University, for contributions to social work with rural and tribal communities.
- 2026: Doctor of Letters (Honoris Causa), GITAM Deemed to be University, for contributions to public health, rural development, and grassroots leadership.

== See also ==
- Swami Vivekananda Youth Movement
- Swami Vivekananda
