= Marimallappa High School =

Marimallappa's High School
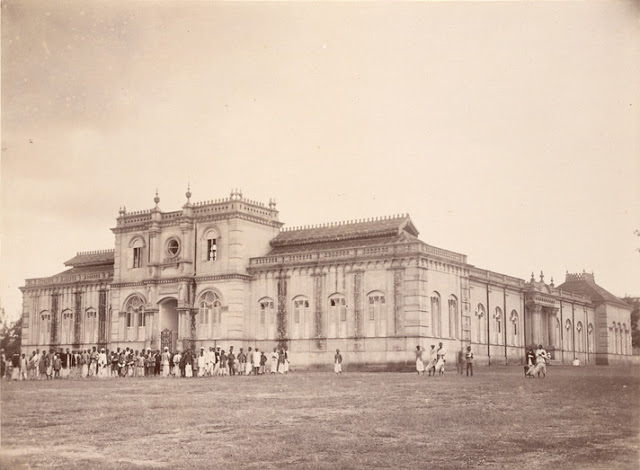
- Main building (1890)

Location
- Mysore, 570024; India
- Coordinates: 12°18′23″N 76°38′47″E

Information
- Type: Government-Aided, Private School
- Founded: 1876
- Head teacher: Anil Sangaappa
- Teaching staff: 33 teaching staff (2016-2017)
- Average class size: 15x20 average class size
- Language: English and Kannada medium
- Campus: Urban

Marimallappa's High School, Mysore, India, was founded by Sri Gurikar Marimallappa (1818–1871) as a domestic school, the founding of which was backed by Maharaja Chamarajendra Wadiyar X. The school later became a part of Marimallappa's Educational Institution in 1876, as his legacy.

== Description ==
The school achieved a 100% pass rate in the SSLC examinations in 2021, including a girl who scored the highest in Karnataka. The school competes with nearby Sadvidya Pathashala for the best exam results.

== Subsidiaries ==
- Marimallappa's Higher Primary School
- Marimallappa's Pre-University College
- Marimallappa's Evening College
- Marimallappa's College of Business Management and Science
- Marimallappa Marimallamma Women's Arts and Commerce College

== See also ==
- List of Heritage Buildings in Mysore
- List of educational institutions in Mysore
