= Kabini dam =

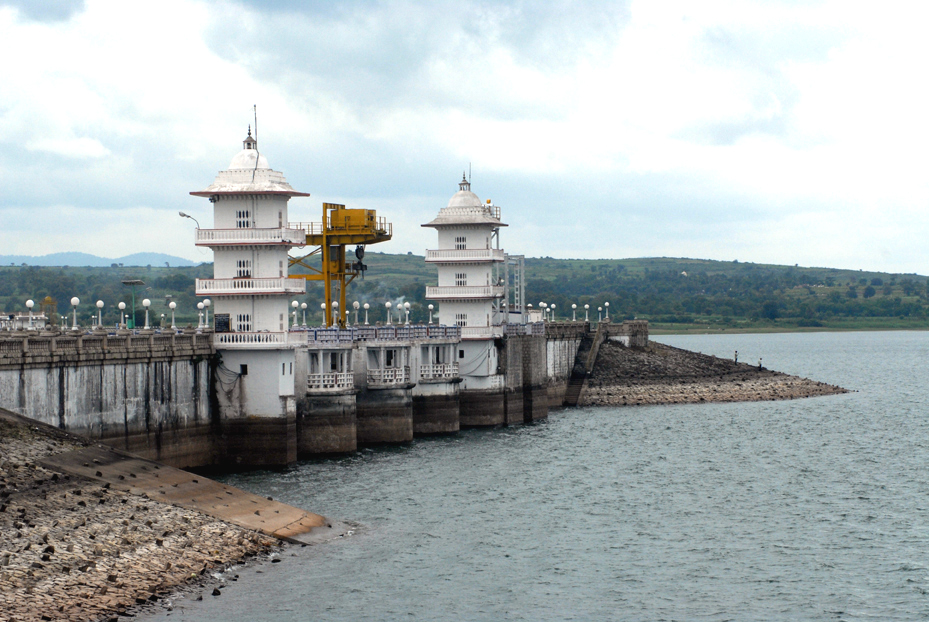
- Interactive map of Kabini dam
- Official name: Kabini Reservoir
- Location: Beechanahalli village, Heggadadevanakote Taluk, Mysore district, Karnataka, India
- Coordinates: 11.9735°N 76.3528°E
- Opening date: 1974

Dam and spillways
- Impounds: Kabini River
- Height: 166 ft. above River Bed Level
- Length: 12,927 ft.

Reservoir
- Creates: Kabini Reservoir
- Total capacity: 19.52 Tmcft

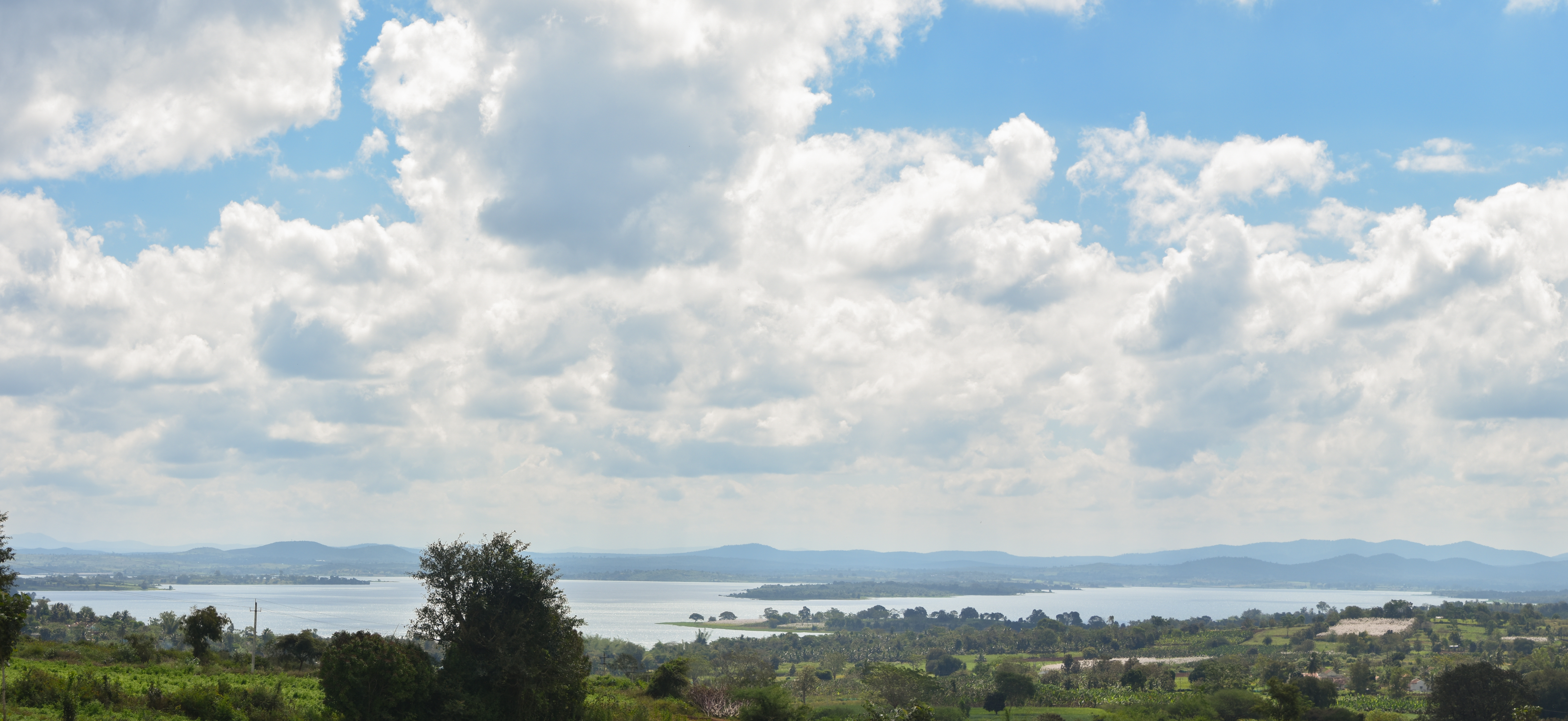
Panorama of central Kabini Reservoir

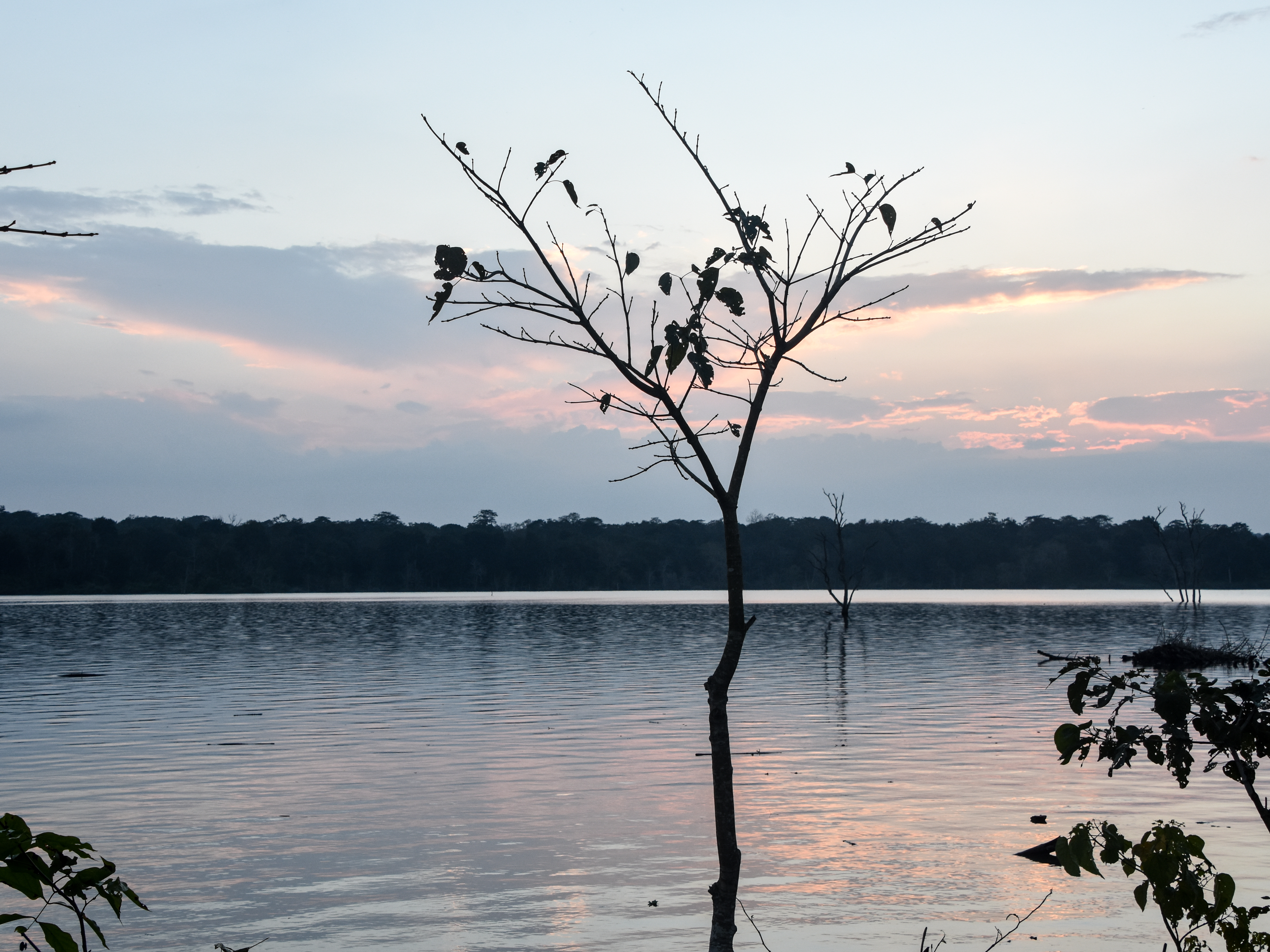
Sunset over Kabini, from Nagarhole National Park

The Kabini dam is built on the Kabini River in Bidarahally and Beechanahally villages of Heggadadevanakote Taluk in Mysore district of Karnataka, India. The dam has a Length of 966 metres (3,169 ft) and it was built in 1974. The main purpose of the dam is to provide drinking water and irrigation of 22 villages and 14 hamlets and also generate electricity. The dam also provides water to two other dams which are Sagaredoddakere and Upper Nugu Dams. It is an earthen dam with a masonry spillway on the left bank. The dam has a height of 166 feet (51 m) and a length of 12,927 feet (3,940 m). The length of the Spillway is 250 feet (76 m), and it has 4 spillway gates. The reservoir filling period is June to November and depleting period is November to May. It is a part of mini hydel power project.
