= Karnataka State Dr. Gangubhai Hangal Music and Performing Arts University =

State University in Karnataka

Karnataka State Dr. Gangubai Hangal Music and Performing Arts University
- Motto: Globalization affects our cultural history; this is our motto to nurture, develop, preserve our rich culture.
- Type: Public
- Established: 14 February 2008
- Affiliations: UGC
- Chancellor: Governor of Karnataka
- Vice-Chancellor: Dr K Ramakrishnayya
- Location: Mysore, Karnataka, India
- Website: Official Website

KSGH Music and Performing Arts University, also abbreviated as (KSGH MPAU), is a public university exclusively dedicated to the study and research of music and performing arts. It was established by the Government of Karnataka. It is functioning from a heritage building (its temporary campus) in the Lakshmipuram area of Mysore. It is named after Gangubai Hangal.

It offers undergraduate, postgraduate and doctoral courses.

== Founding ==
The university was founded on 14 February 2008 and formally established by the State Government of Karnataka through the Karnataka State Dr Gangubai Hangal Music and Performing Arts University Act, 2009 which was duly passed in State Legislature.

== See also ==
- Tamil Nadu Music and Fine Arts University
- Bhatkhande Sanskriti Vishwavidyalaya
- Indira Kala Sangeet Vishwavidyalaya
- Raja Mansingh Tomar Music & Arts University
- Manipur University of Culture
- List of educational institutions in Mysore
