= Moyar =

Moyar is a surname. Notable people with the surname include:

- Mark Moyar (born 1971), Senior Advisor at the US Agency for International Development
- Dean Moyar, American philosopher and associate professor of philosophy at Johns Hopkins University

== See also ==
- Moyar, community from Kerala-Karnataka coast
