= Saragooru Nanjangud =

Coordinates: 12.119977°N 76.680093°E

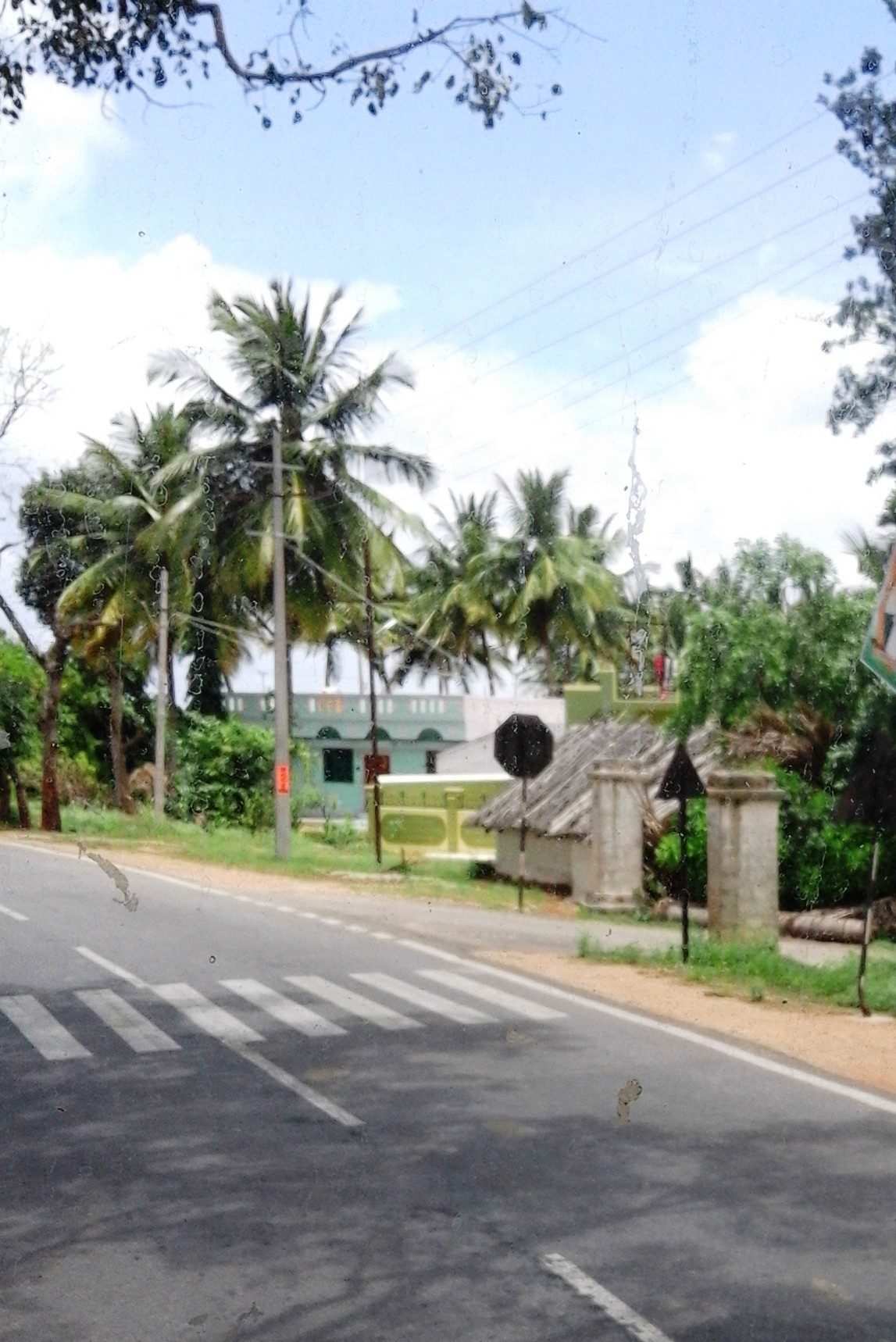
Saragooru village in Nanjangud Taluk

Saragooru Nanjangud is a small village in Mysore district of Karnataka state, India.

== Location ==
Saragooru village is located on the road from Nanjangud to T.Narasipur.

== Demographics ==
There are 553 families living in the village with a total population of 2,283. Literacy rate is 65%.

== Administration ==
As per constitution of India and Panchyati Raaj Act, Saragooru village is administrated by Sarpanch (Head of Village) who is elected representative of village.

== See also ==
- Sargur, H.D.Kote
