= Pramati Hillview Academy =

School in India

Pramati Hill View Academy
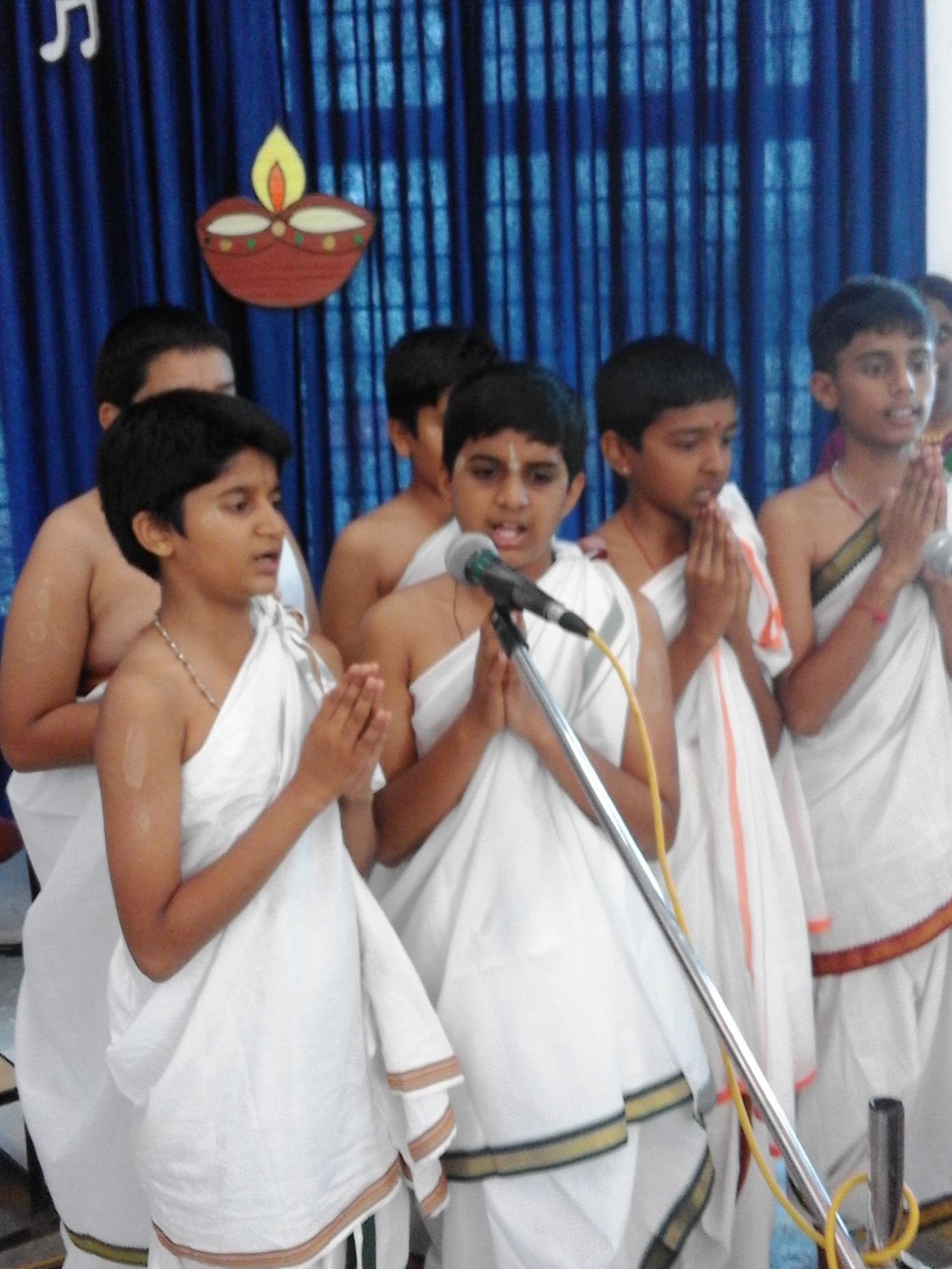
- Sanskrit Day celebrations

Location
- Kuvempu Nagar; Udayaravi road Mysore, Karnataka, 570022; India
- Coordinates: 12.28605°N 76.62890°E

Information
- School type: Junior College and Senior Secondary School
- Grades: 1–12(cbse1-10, puc(11),/cbse11, cbse12

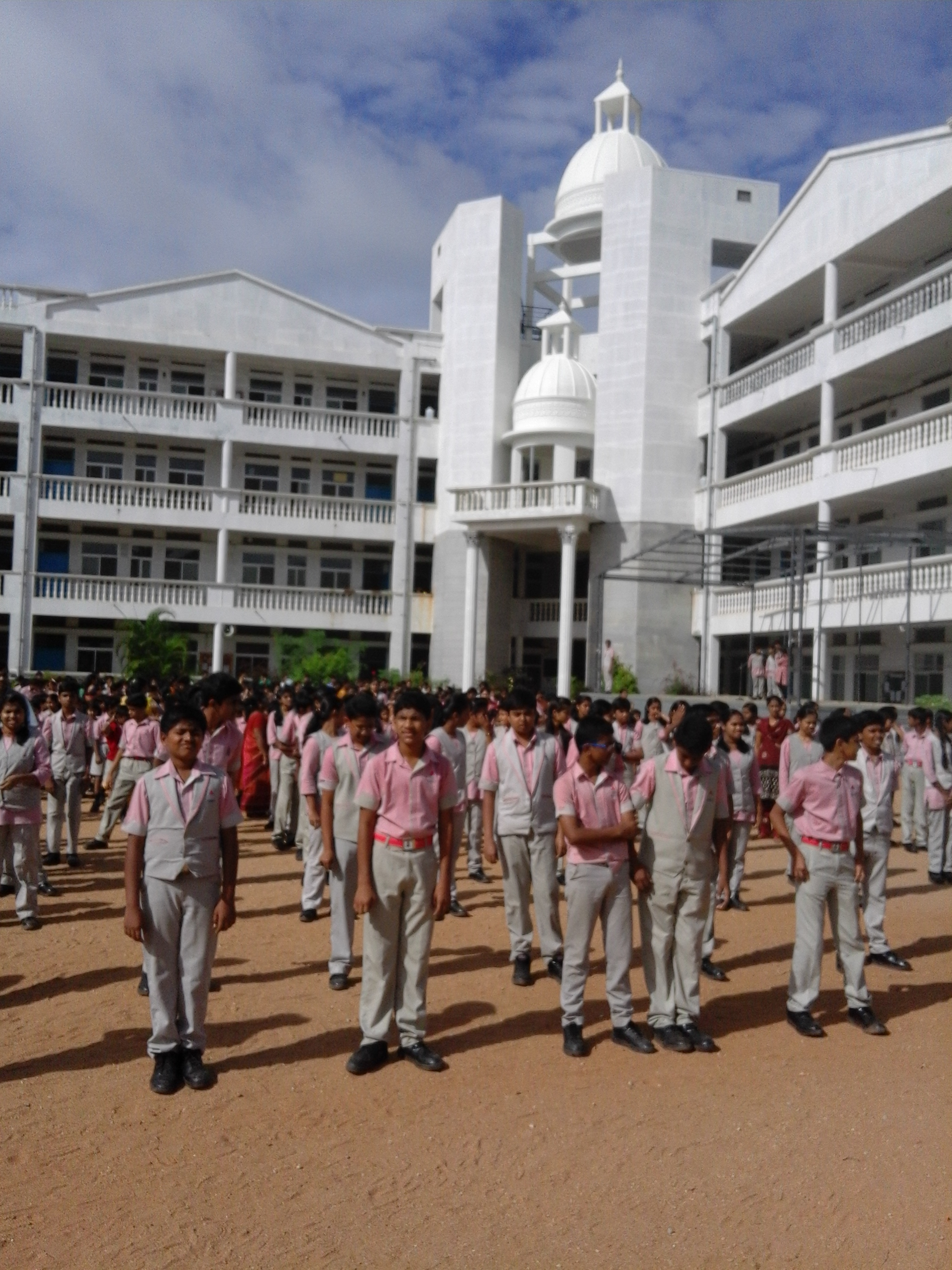
Paramati School

Pramati Hillview Academy is an Indian junior college and senior secondary school located at Kuvempu Nagar in Mysore, Karnataka. The school is being run by H.V. Rajeeva. The management president is Bhavani Shankar . The school was inaugurated by the acharaya of madhva peetam.

== Academics ==
Pramati Hillview Academy has separate school and college sections.

In the academic session 2019–2020 there were 15 'TEN' C.G.P.A holders for class 10. The school also provides 'NTSE' coaching for class 10 and in this academic year school students scored second and fourth ranks in all over state. Special coaching for NEET and CET is provided in class 11 and class 12 in the school timetable itself. Many of students cleared the JEE-MAINS during(2020–21).

== Affiliation ==
Pramati Hillview Academy is affiliated to the Central Board of Secondary Education New Delhi, India. The school has also got the affiliation for Pre University Education(PUC) for grade 11 from the academic session 2017-18. Apart from school education, the institution also provides special coaching for competitive exams like CET, NEET, JEE etc.

== Infrastructure ==
The school has both residential and day-scholar students. The facilities for having lunch in the school premises is provided for day scholars and boarders. The school has got a vast playground for sports and other co-curricular activities . The school is active in many social activities. The school has achieved 100% results in Board examinations since the past several years. Medium of instruction is English for both the schemes.

== Facilities ==
The school has specialised laboratories for science, mathematics and computer science. There are well trained and student friendly attendants appointed for each laboratory who help the students with their experiments. The school also provides boarding and day boarding facilities with good arrangements. Latest equipments are being provided to students so as to have complete decorum of the institution. The institution also provides hygienic food facilities inside the campus itself.

== Curriculum ==
The curriculum of the school is based upon Central Board of Secondary Education, India. For class 11 curriculum is optional between state syllabus and central board syllabus respectively.

== Image Gallery ==
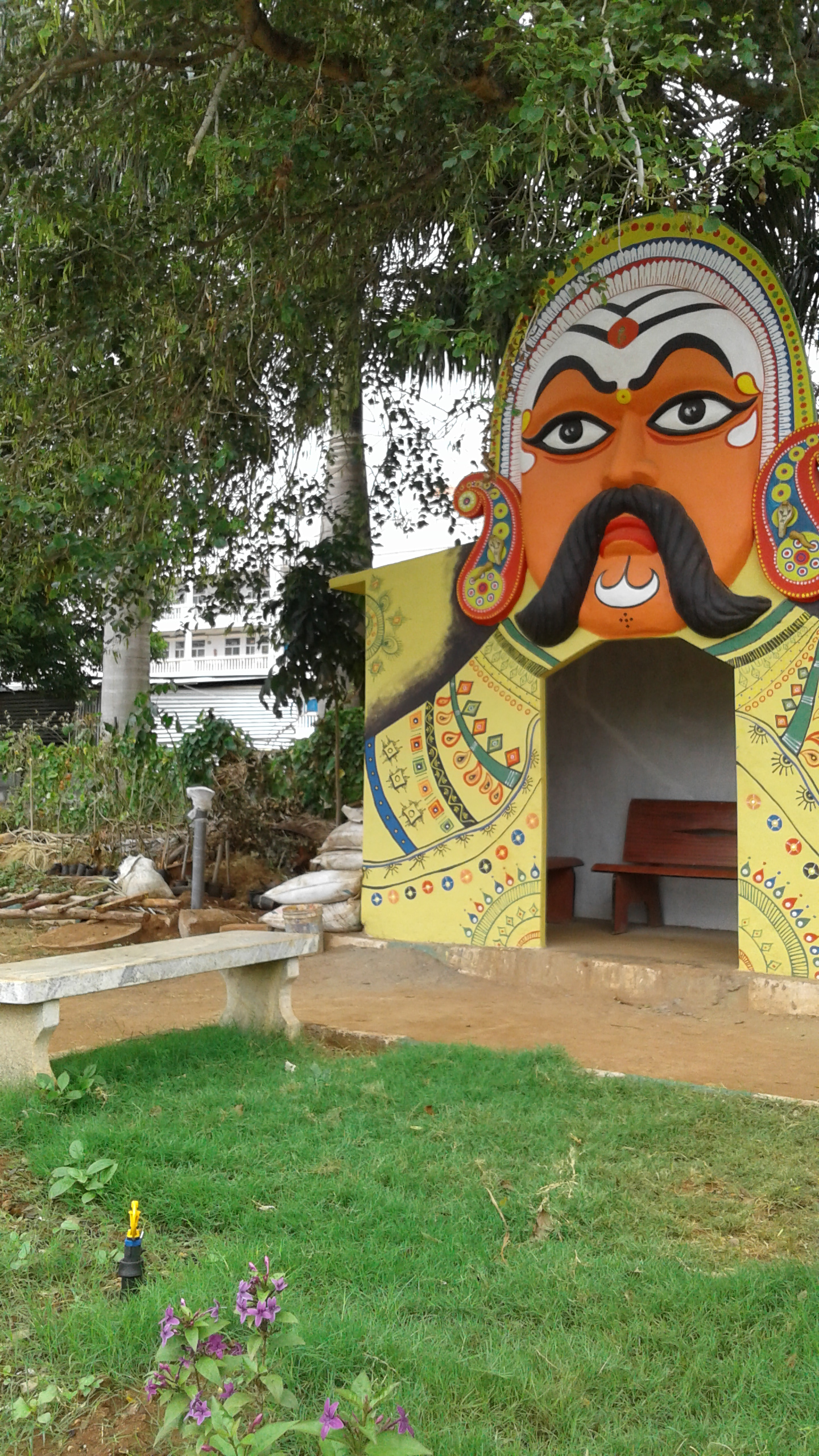
Snake Park

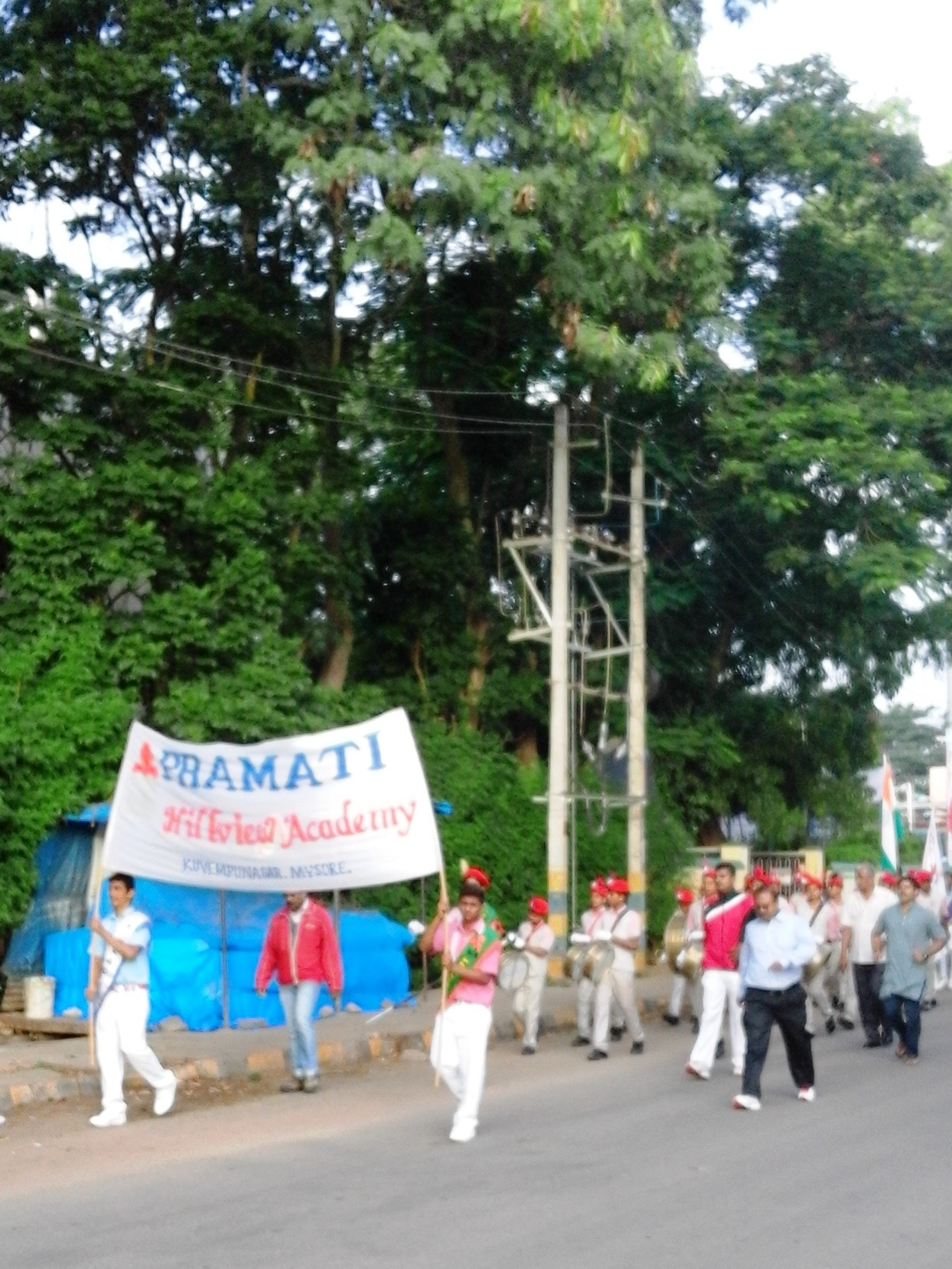
Pramati kids

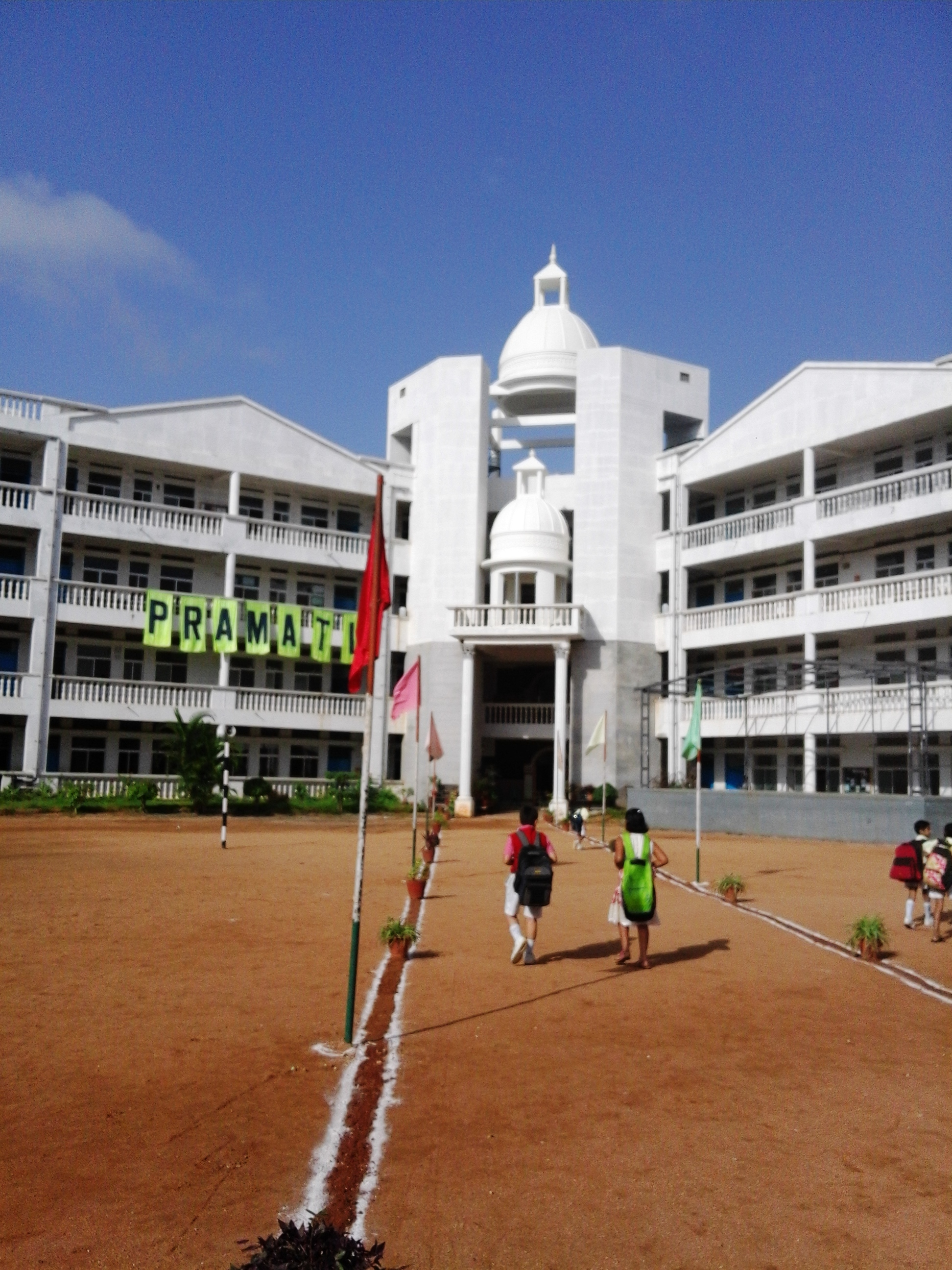
Pramati school
