= Kabini River =

River in Kerala, South India, tributary of Kaveri and in Kerala

Kapila
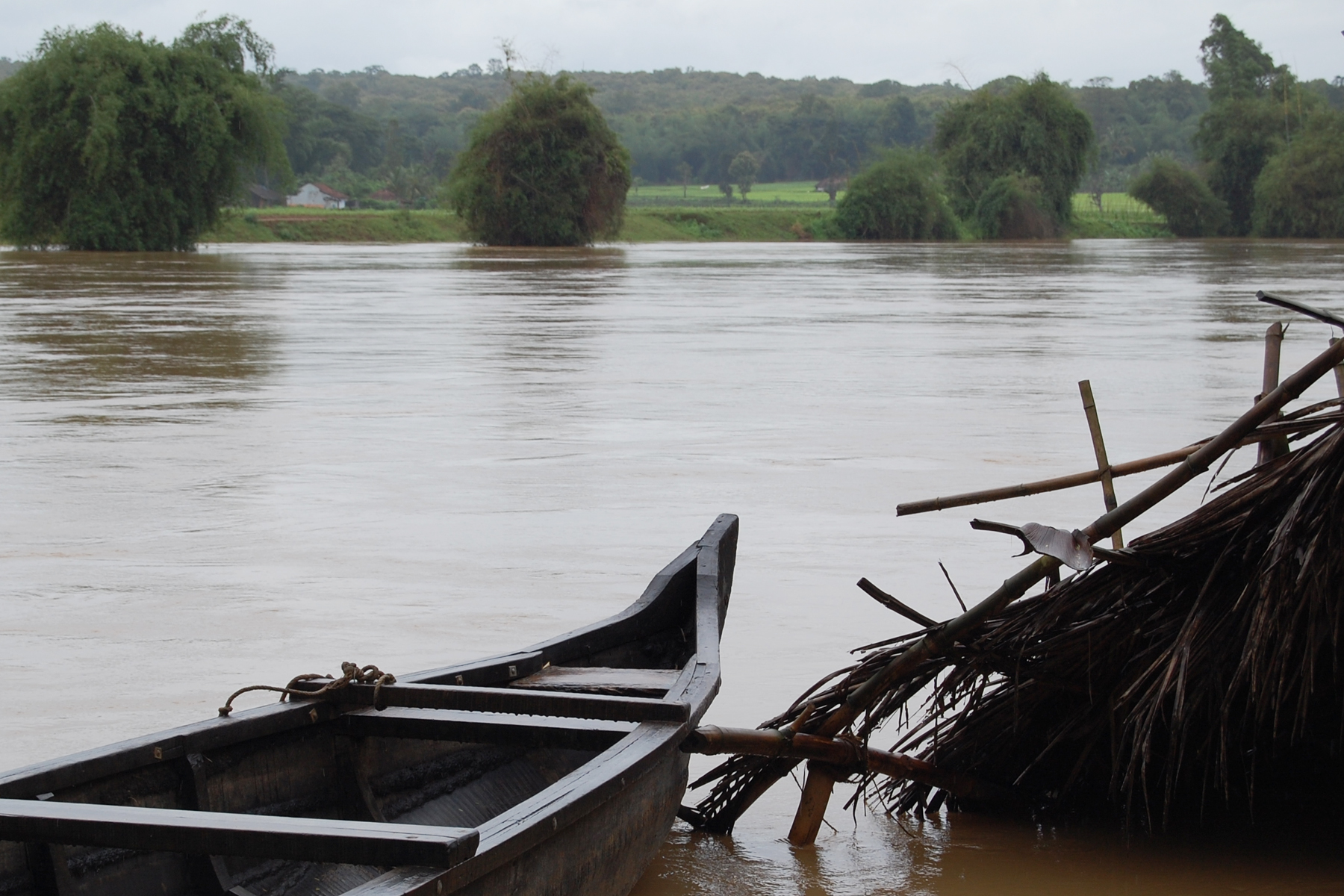
- Kapila River from Kabinigiri, Kerala

Location
- Country: India
- State: Kerala, Karnataka

Physical characteristics
- Source: Panamaram
  - location: Wayanad district, kerala, India
  - coordinates: 11°48′01″N 76°04′29″E
- Mouth: Tirumakudal Narsipur
  - location: Mysore district, Karnataka, India
  - coordinates: 12°12′56″N 76°54′40″E

The Kabini River is one of the major tributaries of the river Cauvery in southern India, It originates in Wayanad district of Kerala state by the confluence of the Panamaram River and the Mananthavady River. It flows eastward through Wayanad district, entering Mysore district of Karnataka, to join the Kaveri River in Mysore district of Karnataka.

Close to the town of Sargur it forms the huge Kabini Reservoir. The backwaters of the Kabini reservoir are very rich in wildlife especially in summer when the water level recedes to form rich grassy meadows. The Kabini dam is 2,284 ft (696 m) in length with an original gross storage of 19.52 tmcft. The Kabini Dam is situated between villages Bichanahalli and Bidarahalli having distance of 17 km (11 mi) 6 km away from Sargur town in Heggadadevana kote taluk, Mysore district, Karnataka.

== Wildlife ==
The Kabini Forest Reserve is one of the most popular wildlife destinations of Karnataka, due to its accessibility, green landscape surrounding a large lake, and sightings of herds of elephants and tigers. It is 61 km (38 mi) away from Mysuru and 205 km (127 mi) from Bengaluru, and comprises the south-eastern part of Nagarahole National Park. The reserve is spread over 55 acres (22 ha) of forestland, steep valleys, and water bodies. Once a private hunting lodge of the Maharaja of Mysore, Kabini was a popular shikar hotspot for British Viceroys and Indian royalty. There are around 120 tigers, more than 100 leopards, four types of deer, Sloth bear, Indian Gaurs and elephants in the Nagarahole National Park.

== Course ==
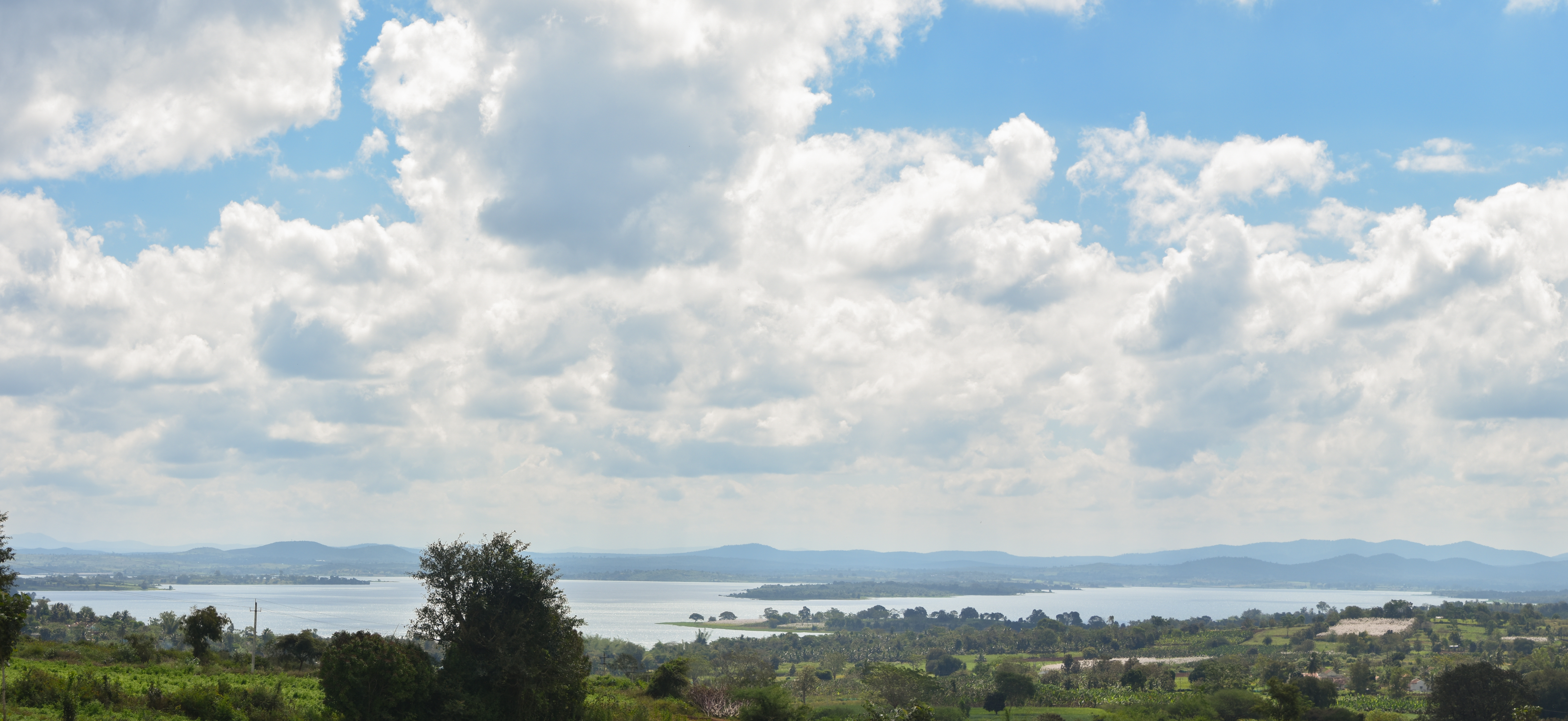
Panoramic view of central Kabini Reservoir, Karnataka

The river originates in the Pakramthalam hills near Niravilpuzha at Kuttiady-Mananthavady road. Makkiyad river and Periya river join it near Korome and Valad respectively. After flowing through Mananthavady town, Panamaram river joins Kabini near Payyampally. One branch of the Panamaram river starts from the Banasura Sagar reservoir near Padinjarethara and the other branch of the river start from Lakkidi hills. After traversing 2 kilometres (1.2 mi) from the confluence of Panamaram river kabini forms an island called Kuruva Island, spreading over 520 acres (2.1 km^{2}) with diverse flora and fauna. Within 20 km (12 mi) it reaches the kabini reservoir bordering Kerala and Karnataka for some distance. Between kabini reservoir and Kuruva island Kalindi river joins kabini. Kalindi river originates from Brahmagiri hills which on reaching near Thirunelli Temple the rivulet Papanasini joins it. Taraka and Nugu are the two small rivers in Heggadadevana kote taluk that join the Kapila (Kabini river).

== Kabini dam ==
Kabini dam
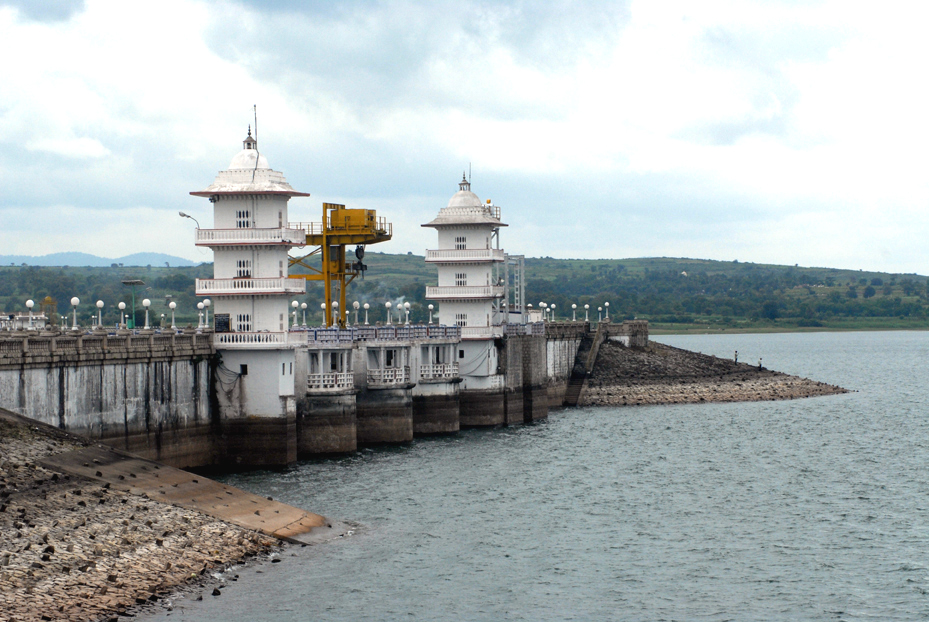
- Interactive map of Kabini dam
- Coordinates: 11.9735°N 76.3528°E

Dam and spillways
- Type of dam: Earthen Dam with Left Bank spillway
- Impounds: Kapila River
- Height: 166 ft. above River Bed Level
- Length: 12,927 ft.

The Kabini dam is built on the River Kapila in the district of Mysore. The dam is 696 meters in length and was built in 1974. The exact location of the dam is near village Beechanahally, in Taluk Heggadadevanakote. The catchment area of the dam is 2,141.90 km^{2}. It caters to the needs of around 22 villages and 14 hamlets and also a prominent source of drinking water to Mysuru and Bengaluru. Further significant amount of water is discharged to the Mettur reservoir in Tamil Nadu to fulfill the state's needs.

The dam is spread over an area of 55 hectares covering forests, rivers, lakes and valleys. This dam also provides water to the combined system of Sagaredoddakere and Upper Nugu Dams. There is an arrangement of lifting and transfer of 28.00 TMC of water during the monsoon months from the kabini dam to the other two smaller dams.

== Kabini Bridge ==
The Kabini Bridge on this river is a Heritage monument.

== Image gallery ==
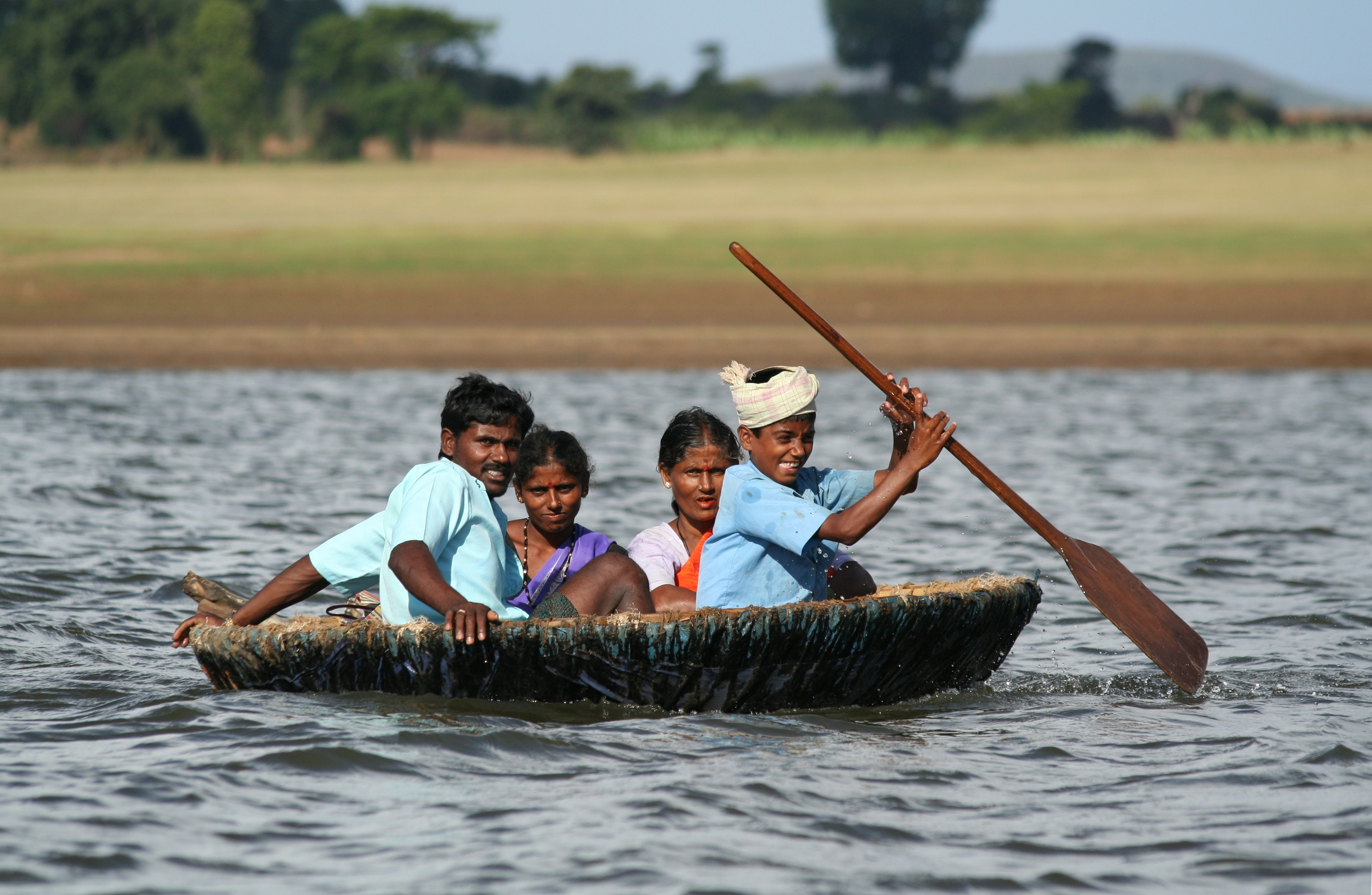
Indian coracles are used on the Kabini river

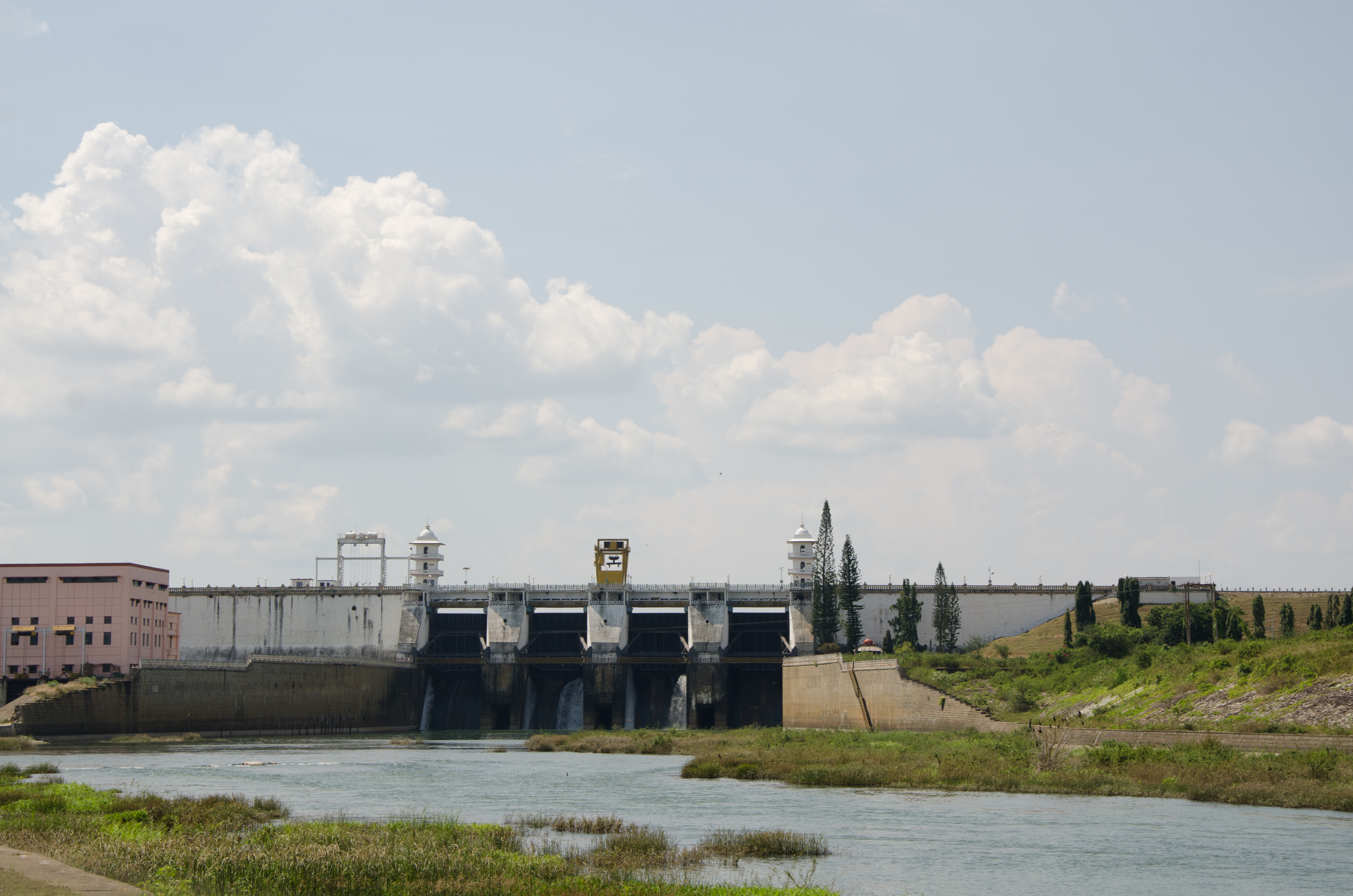
Kabini reservoir

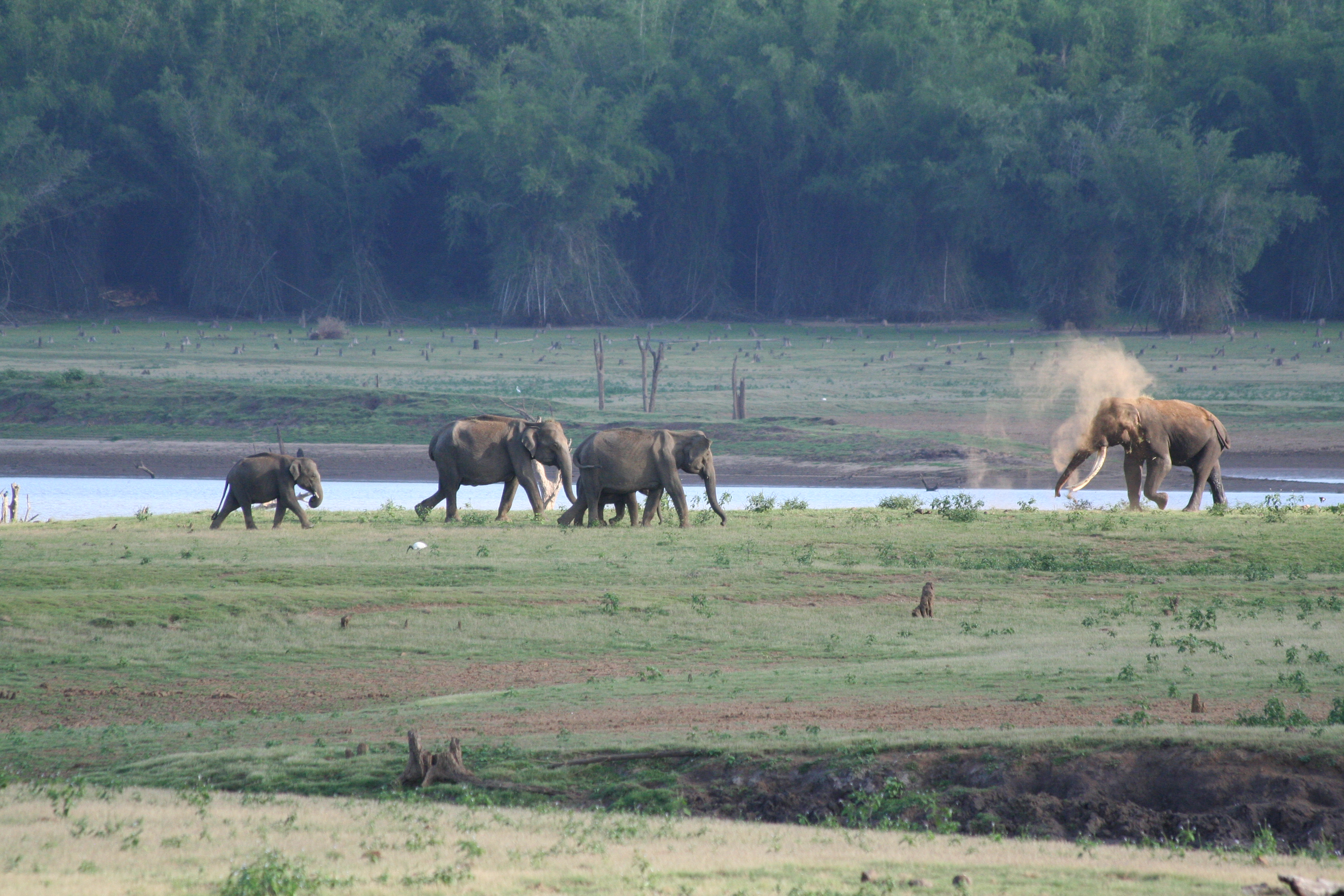
Elephant family on the Kabini river bank

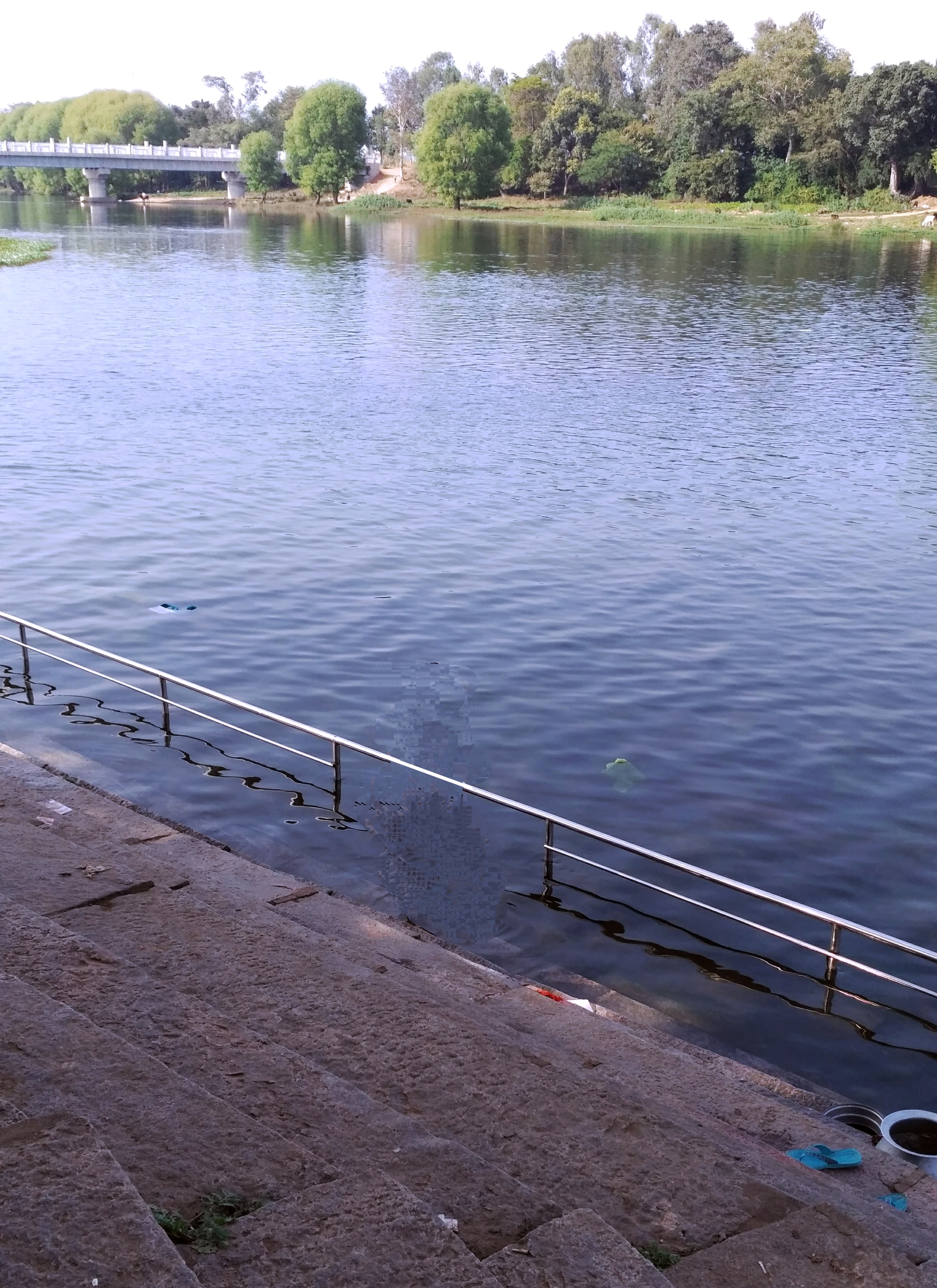
The river Kabini in Nanjangud
