= Swami Vivekananda Youth Movement =

Swami Vivekananda Youth Movement (SVYM)
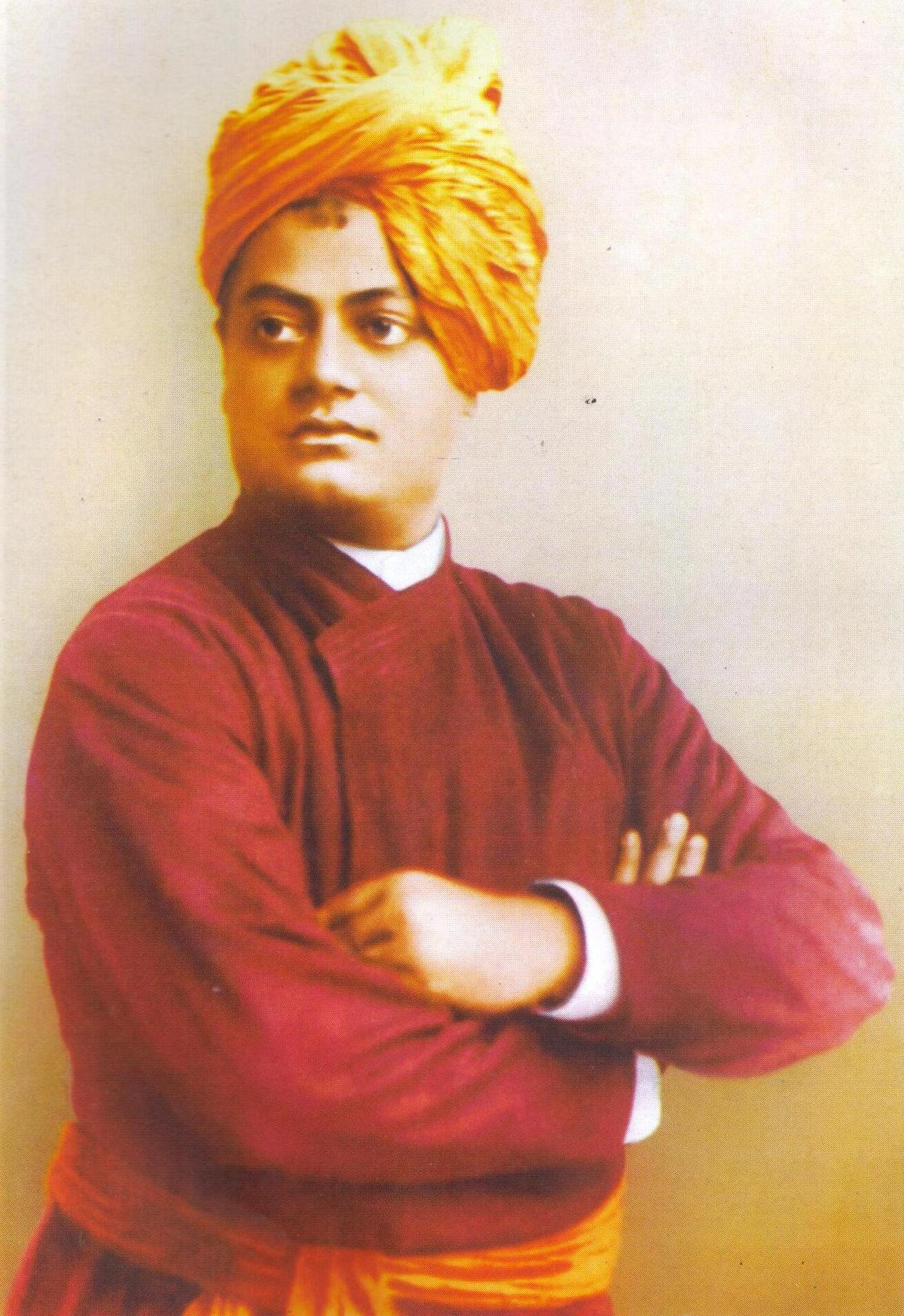
- Swami Vivekananda
- Founders: Dr R Balasubramaniam
- Location: Mysore, Karnataka, India; 12.90350°N 77.59840°E
- Website: http://www.svym.org/

Vivekanand Development, Mysore

Swami Vivekananda Youth Movement (SVYM) is a development organization founded by a group of medicos led by Dr R Balasubramaniam based in Saragur near Mysore in the Indian state of Karnataka. The organization is engaged in building a new civil society in India through its grassroots to policy-level action in health, education and community development. For tribal They have been recognized by private and government bodies inside and outside of Karnataka. Their work in the field of AIDS prevention was recognized by the Indian government. They received awards such as the 'National Youth Award' from the Indian government, and the Mahaveer Award for work in Community and Social Service from the Mahaveer Foundation. Swami Vivekananda, one of the most prominent figures in modern Indian history, remains an inspiration to millions worldwide. His life and teachings have transcended borders, leaving a lasting impact on not just India but the global spiritual and philosophical landscape. Vivekananda was a monk, philosopher, and a key proponent of Hinduism, but more importantly, he was a visionary who aimed at bringing together spirituality and modernity, advocating for a society where science and religion could coexist harmoniously. This essay aims to explore the life, philosophy, and legacy of Swami Vivekananda, analyzing his contributions to spirituality, social reform, and national development.

== History ==
In 1984 a group of young medical students led by Dr R Balu at Mysore Medical College started the movement.

Their initial intention was to provide rational, ethical and cost-effective medical care to the needy. They started by collecting (free) samples of medicines and distributing them to poor patients, organizing blood donation camps and weekly rural outreach clinics around Mysore. In 1987, they travelled to Heggadadevanakote Taluk, home of displaced and dispossessed forest-based tribes. These indigenous people, belonging to five clans – Jenukuruba, Kadukuruba, Yerava, Paniya and Bunde Soliga – had been displaced twice from their natural habitat by government development projects ‘Project Tiger’ and ‘Kabini Reservoir’, and were forced to live in penury on the fringes of the Bandipur National Park.

The medicos set up a clinic at a village named Brahmagiri, about 80 km from Mysore city, with help from the Mysore District Administration. Realizing early that Medicare by itself is not enough and hoping that education would help the next generation, they opened an informal school in a cow-shed. Socioeconomic empowerment activities were added to health and education, and the rural poor were engaged as the organization moved from the role of a ‘provider’ to a ‘facilitator’. A 10-bed hospital was started at Kenchanahalli, along with community-based programs in health and education. As the medicos returned after completing their post-training, the multi-speciality Vivekananda Memorial Hospital took shape at Saragur. The organization continued to grow and expand in the 1990s.

== Activities ==
SVYM's principal area of operation is in Mysore. They operate various institution- and community-based health and education projects and undertake Community Development Initiatives, catering to a populace of about 400,000 including both tribal groups and the rural poor.

SVYM has a training/resource center called Vivekananda Institute for Leadership Development at Mysore, which also serves as a base for urban-based interventions and also houses their registered office. They work in the most undeveloped regions of North Karnataka, particularly in Bijapur and Dharwad. In addition to direct intervention, they train and build capacities of like-minded NGOs. They have an education project running in Bangalore. Their Training, Research, Advocacy and Consultancy (TRAC) activities give them an India-wide presence.

SVYM's chapters in Hassan, Kodagu and Dakshina Kannada districts are run by members of SVYM. They carry out locally relevant projects.

For the tribal people, they facilitate mobile education and medical services, namely Vidhyavahini and Sikshavahini.

== Health care ==
The institution-based services under health are provided through Vivekananda Memorial Hospitals (VMH) at Saragur and Kenchanahalli. VMH–Saragur is a 90-bed facility offering multi-speciality secondary care at an affordable cost to the rural and tribal populace. It is affiliated to the Rajiv Gandhi University of Health Sciences (RGUHS), Bangalore and offers India's first post-graduate fellowship course in HIV medicine for medical and dental professionals. VMH – Kenchanahalli is a 10-bed facility offering primary care, along with options for Ayurveda Chikitsa. SVYM hospitals are recognized training centers for the capacity building of health professionals from specialists to community workers.

Community-based services are provided in the key focus areas listed above, through the outreach program and a network of grassroots level health workers called health facilitators. Their HIV control program offers comprehensive, inclusive and end-to-end care. It is rated as one of the best in the country and has been hailed as a best-practice model by UNAIDS.

== Education and research ==
SVYM's educational initiatives include two schools – the Viveka Tribal Center for Learning at Hosahalli (semi-residential, formal school recognized by the Government of Karnataka) and the CBSE-affiliated Viveka School of Excellence at Saragur. It operates four community-based initiatives – in Shikshanavahini, Prerepana, Vidyakiran and Premavidya. The Training, Research, Advocacy, and Consultancy (TRAC) sector aims to serve India by building the potential of individuals and institutions for the development sector (Govt, NGOs and Corporates) and synthesize their efforts for general gain. It strives to develop innovative programmatic models for the development sector and influence public policy.

TRAC services are provided through three institutions – Vivekananda Institute for Leadership Development (V-LEAD), Vivekananda Institute of Indian Studies (VIIS) and Grassroot Research and Advocacy Movement (GRAAM).

Vivekananda Institute for Leadership Development is recognized by the University of Mysore and offers a Masters Program in Development Management. Another flagship TRAC program, ‘Youth for Development’, aims to create a trained, committed workforce of youth who can take up developmental activities in rural areas. These two programs create career opportunities in the development sector for participants.

Vivekananda Institute of Indian Studies aims to enable contextually relevant development, founded in an understanding of Indian values, culture and tradition, and interpreted in a spirit of appreciative inquiry, while GRAAM is an institution for public policy research and program evaluation.

== See also ==
- Saragur
- HD Kote
