= Sadvidya Pathashala =

Educational institution in Mysore, India

Sadvidya Educational Institutions
- Motto: ತಮಸೋಮಾ ಜ್ಯೋತಿರ್ಗಮಯ
- Established: 1854 (172 years ago)
- Founder: Periswamy Tirumalacharya
- Location: ಸಂಖ್ಯೆ ೭. ನಾರಾಯಣಶಾಸ್ತ್ರಿ ರಸ್ತೆ., Mysore, Karnataka, 570024, India
- Website: sadvidyamysuru.ac.in

Sadvidya Educational Institutions is an educational institution located in Mysore, Karnataka in southwestern India, providing education in the languages English, Kannada, Hindi and Sanskrit. It is located in the heart of Mysore city.

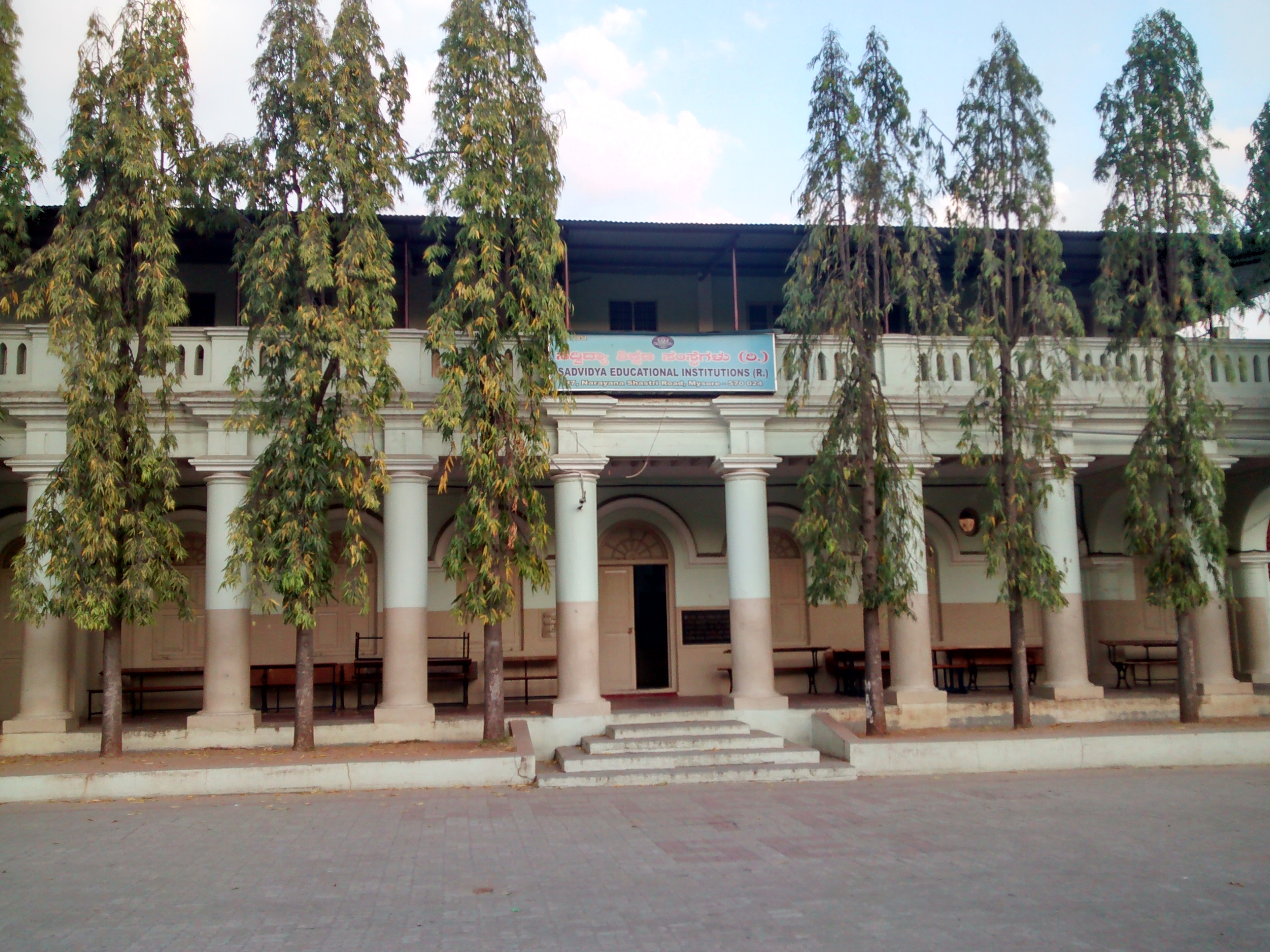
This building houses administrative offices and middle school.

It is one of the city's oldest institutions, established in 1854 by Periswamy Thirumalacharya as an elementary school. Gunja Narasimhaiah gifted the building and the then Maharaja of Mysore, Chamaraja Wadiyar, laid the foundation stone. Swami Vivekananda stayed at the Pathashala from 9 to 24 November 1892. Swami Vivekananda camped at the school for two weeks before leaving to the U.S. to participate in the Parliament of World Religions. There is a plaque at Sadvidya Pathashala.

The centenary celebrations of the pathashala were held in 1972 and it was decided to start a high school following which the Sadvidya High School was opened in 1973–74, and in 1999 the Sadvidya Composite Pre-university College was added to provide tertiary education. Recently, Sadvidya Semi-Residential College has also been launched.

Locally, the school competes with Marimallappa High School for best results in SSLC.

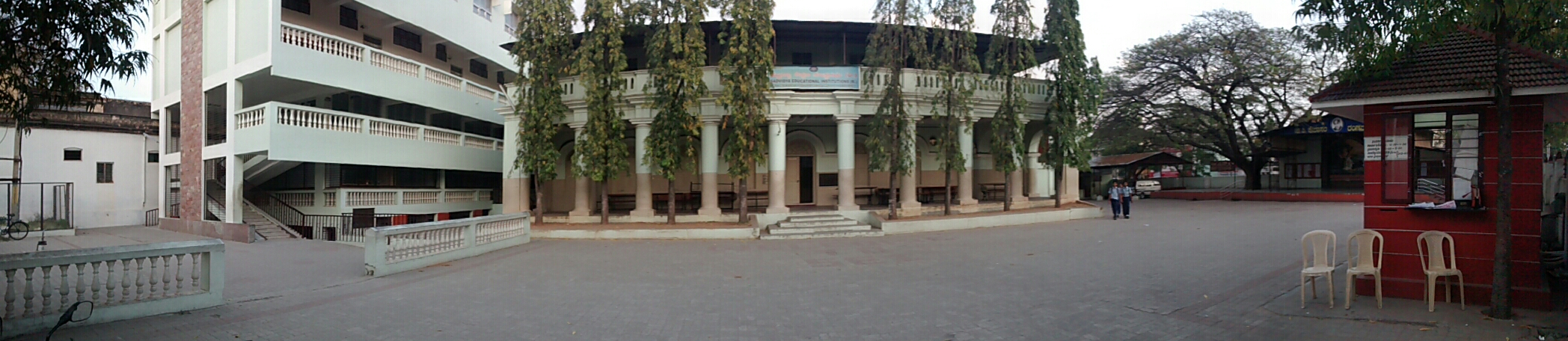
Panoramic view Sadvidya Educational Institutions.
