= Sargur =

Sargur Saraguru
- town
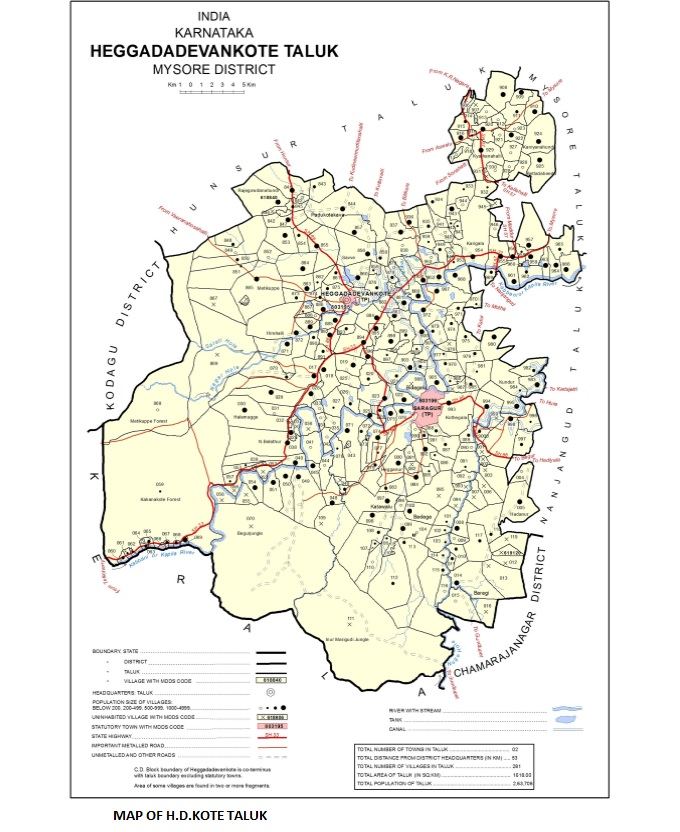
- Heggadadevanakote Taluk boundary before creation of Sargur Taluk

- Location in Karnataka, India Sargur (India)
- Coordinates: 11.997°N 76.397°E
- Country: India
- State: Karnataka
- District: Mysuru

Area
  - Total: 4 km^{2} (1.5 sq mi)
- Elevation: 686 m (2,251 ft)

Population (2011)
  - Total: 11,425
  - Density: 2,591.5/km^{2} (6,712/sq mi)

Languages
  - Official: Kannada
- Time zone: UTC+5:30 (IST)
- PIN: 571121
- Telephone code: 08228
- Vehicle registration: KA-45

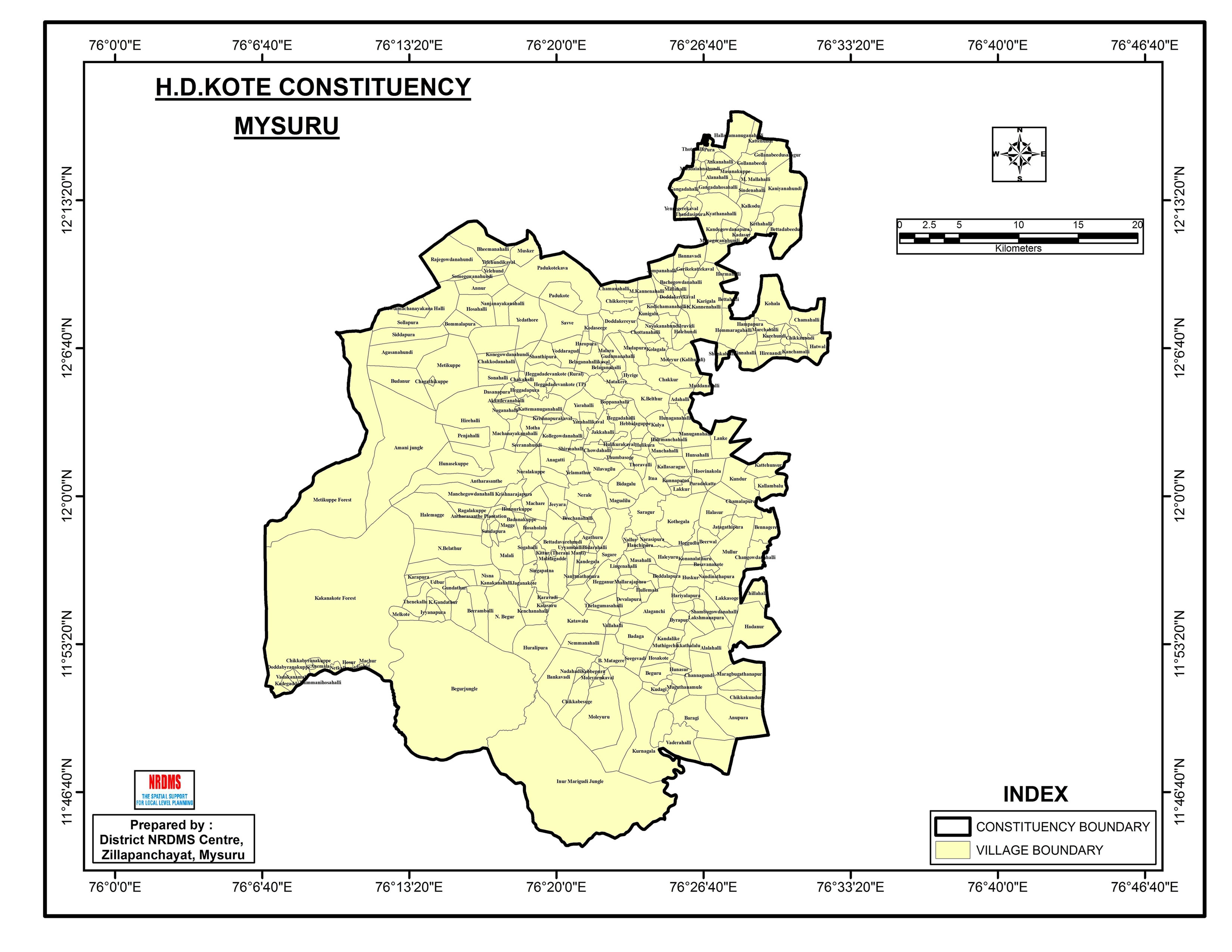
Heggadadevanakote Taluk boundary same as Assembly Constituency as per 2011 Census before creation of Sargur Taluk

Sargur or Saraguru is a town and taluk in Mysore district of Karnataka, India. It is 55 km from the city of Mysore.

== Geography ==
Sargur is located at latitude 11° 58' 60'N and longitude 76° 25' 0 E. It has an average elevation of 686 metres (2253 ft). The Kabini river flows through this town which provides for the irrigation needs of the villagers through the Kabini – Nugu River irrigation system. Kabini reservoir and Nugu reservoir and the Bandipur Tiger Reserve are the tourist attractions for people visiting Sargur

== Geology ==
One of the oldest rock types of the state of Karnataka is named after Sargur. In geological terms it is called "Sargur supracrustals" or "Sargur schist" (about 3,300 to 3,000 million years old), an older formation of the two Precambrian craton formations, the other younger formation is the Dharwar Supracrustal rock (about 3,000 to 2,600 million year old).

The Sargur schist (within the Peninsular gneiss) belt in H. D. Kote taluk extends from Sargur to Mysore city for about 40 km. This belt was named as Sargur series and it may be the oldest suture zone in the Indian subcontinent. The series comprises a complex series of metasediments and basic igneous rocks. The garnets illuminate gneiss and the associated norites occurring as patches within the genesis of southern Mysore represent the remnants of the older khondalite – charnockite system.

== Religious importance ==
While the town has a number of important old Hindu shrines, it is also known for the Jain temples. Jainism has acquired a special place in the history of the region, of the Ganga, Rashtrakuta, Chalukya and other dynasties, who have ruled Karnataka.

Shravanabelagola (Gommateshwara)and other equally important places, mostly in the coastal regions endowed with a rich cultural heritage and Jain legacy are well known. Sargur, which has a large number of resident Jains, also attracts not only Jains, but people of all religions who come here not only for religious reasons but also as tourists to visit the Ananthanatha Swami Jain temple and a Chowmukha which have been recently renovated (The Panchakalyana Pratishta Mahotsav) was held in July 2005).

Many of the Hindu temples are in a dilapidated state. In fact, the deity of Srinivasa in an old temple was shifted quite some years back to Jayanagar in Bangalore

== Swami Vivekananda Youth Movement (SVYM) ==
SVYM, a NGO founded in 1984 by a group of medicos from Mysore Medical College led by Dr. R. Balasubramaniam, has undertaken various institution-based and community-based health and education projects and also several Community Development initiatives, catering to a populace of about 300,000 comprising, both tribals and non-tribals in the region. SVYM runs the Vivekananda Memorial Hospital, the Viveka School of Excellence and Viveka Tribal Center for Learning and Creation of rural infrastructure – building of low cost houses, toilets, borewells, etc., in Saragur. One of the recent applications of space technology initiated by Indian Space Research Organization (ISRO) is in the field of telemedicine to provide expert medical services to the rural and remote areas. Under the telemedicine project, hospitals/health centres in remote locations are linked via INSAT satellites with super specialty hospitals at major towns/cities, bringing in connectivity between patients at remote end with the specialist doctors for medical consultations and treatment. Telemedicine pilot projects are undertaken by ISRO with the involvement of selected super specialty hospitals located in major cities and smaller health centres in distant and rural areas. Vivekananda Memorial Hospital at Saragur has undertaken this project in cooperation with Narayana Hrudayalaya, a super specialty Hospital for heart care in Bangalore. The Karnataka Task Force on Health and the Government of Karnataka have extended cooperation and support. Karnataka State Remote Sensing Applications Centre (KSRSAC), which was established in 1989, is coordinating the telemedicine project. The 'Sanitation Park,' a unique park of its kind in the country, has also been developed by SVYM. Located in the premises of Vivekananda Memorial Hospital, various models of toilets are on demonstration – whose construction costs are affordable – for people to choose the kind of toilet that best suits their budget. At places where there is scarcity of water, there are toilets which can suit their respective problems and are environment-friendly also. The park also gives information on the different systems of collection and distribution of waste. In organic farming, this waste is re-utilised in the form of manure and medicine. The emblem of Swami Vivekananda Youth Movement symbolizes the organization in letter and spirit, reflecting its basic tenet of 'Serving God in Man', as propounded by Swami Vivekananda.

== Irrigation projects ==
The comprehensive Kabini Reservoir Project exists close to Sargur. The project comprises

a) Reservoir across Kabini River near Bidarahally and Beechana villages in Heggadadevanakote Taluk, Mysore with canals on both the banks – 732 m long dam was constructed in 1974 for the twin purpose of irrigation and hydel power generation. At full reservoir level, the lake has a water spread of 6,020 ha and storage capacity of 553 million m^{3}.

b) Reservoir across Bandigadu stream near Sagaredoddakere in Heggadadevanakote taluk with canals on both the banks,

c) Reservoir across river Nugu upstream of the existing Nugu Dam with Right Bank High Level Canal and d) Lifting arrangement for lifting 28.00 TMC of water in the 4 monsoon months from the foreshore of Kabini Dam to the combined system of Sagaredoddakere and Upper Nugu Dams. This project also provides for the irrigation needs of the villagers of Sargur town.

Nugu Reservoir, in Beerwal village in H.D. Kote Taluk, has a catchment area of 984.00 km^{2} with a reservoir water spread of 1410 ha. The Nugu High Level Canal provides irrigation to an area of 20,899 acres (84.58 km^{2}).

== National Park ==
Bandipur Tiger Reserve, situated in the Mysore district of Karnataka, was among the first nine Tiger Reserves created in India at the launch of Project Tiger in 1973. It is contiguous to Mudumalai Wildlife Sanctuary in Tamil Nadu state to south and Wynad Wildlife Sanctuary in Kerala state to the south-west. To the north-west lies Nagarhole National Park. Bandipur Tiger Reserve was formed by including most of the forest area of the then Venugopala Wildlife Park and its sanctum sanctorum at Bandipur, in the year 1973 and named Bandipur National Park. All the forests included in the Reserve are reserved forests notified prior to independence. Notification for the proposed Bandipur National Park was issued in 1985. This park is part of the Nilgiri Biosphere Reserve – the first 'Biosphere Reserve' of India.

The Nugu in the centre, Moyar towards the south and the Kabini between Bandipur and Nagarahole are the rivers that feed this area perennially. Numerous natural and artificial pools are found in Bandipur. The Gopalaswamy hill (1,454.5 m), which houses the famous Venugoplaswamy temple, is one of the highest peaks and Kannegals at 680m is the lowest.

Bandipur is also known as elephant country. It is one of the few reserves that has survived and flourished.

Forest Types are dry deciduous scrub, Southern Tropical/Dry Deciduous & Southern Tropical Moist Mixed deciduous forests cover the reserve area.

Major Fauna comprises Tiger, Leopard, Elephant, Gaur, Sambar, Spotted deer, Sloth bear, Mouse deer, Wild dog, Four horned Antelope and the Endangered Species Tiger, Four horned Antelope, Gaur, Elephant, Panther, Sloth bear, Crocodiles, Mouse deer, Python, Osprey, Pea fowl.

== Image Gallery ==
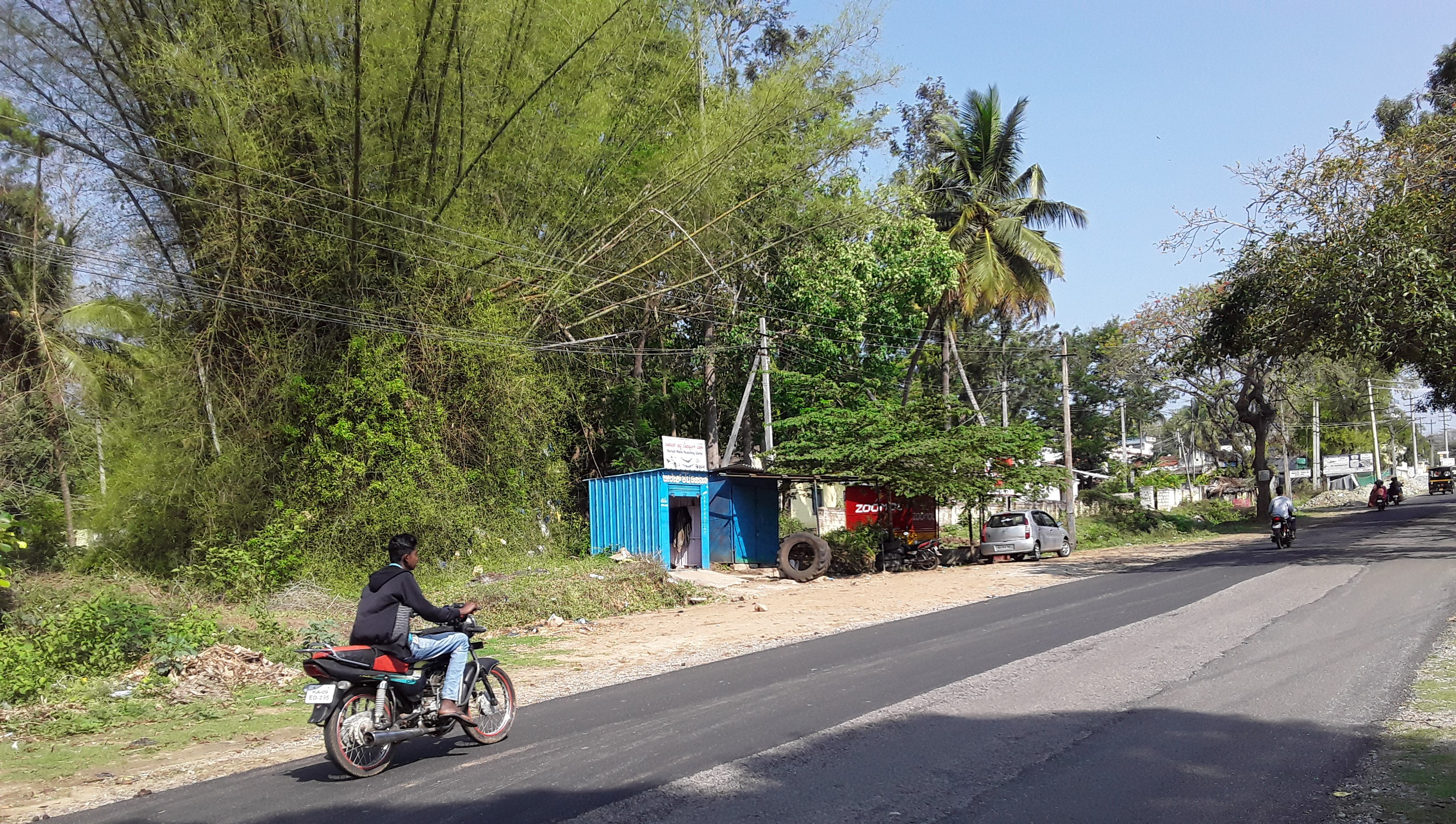
Handpost Junction

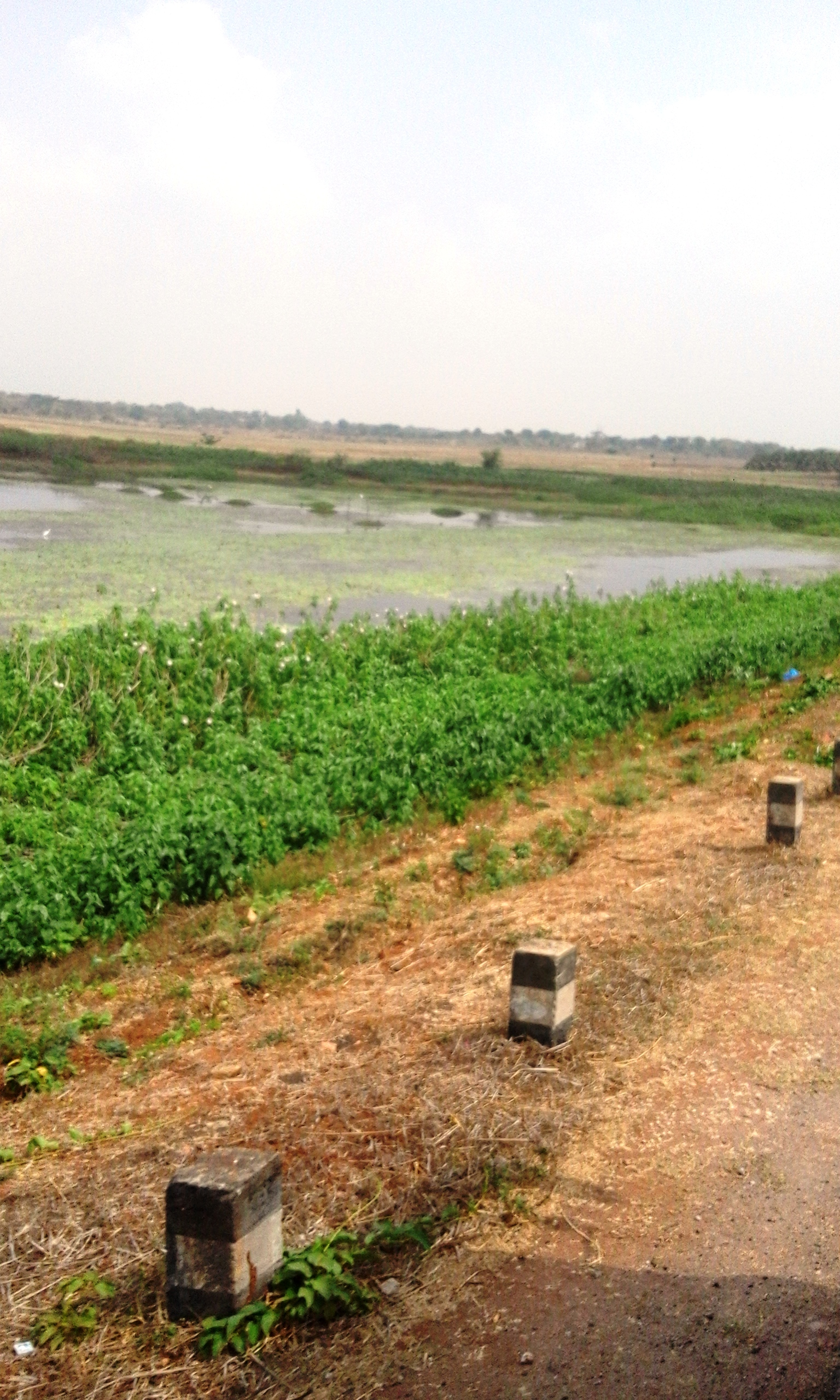
Mysore road from Sargur

== People ==
- Sargur Srihari is a Distinguished Professor in the Department of Computer Science and Engineering at the University at Buffalo, State University of New York. He is the founding director of CEDAR, the Center of Excellence for Document Analysis and Recognition, which was recognized as the first United States Postal Service Center of Excellence in 1991.
- Ramaswami Balasubramaniam, a resident of Saragur founded Swami Vivekananda Youth Movement, which runs a community-based hospital, school and several other community-led health and development initiatives. The organisation is well known for its work on integrated rural and tribal development programmes.

== See also ==
- Saragooru, Nanjangud
- Swami Vivekananda Youth Movement
