= Hinkal =

Town in Karnataka

Coordinates: 12.331096787474047°N 76.60196923026535°E

Hinkal Town, Yelwala Road, Mysore

Hinkal is a Census town situated at the intersection of Hunsur Road aka NH275 and Ring Road aka NH 275K in Mysore city outskirts of Karnataka, India. It is the most populous census town in Mysore district. The nearest railway station located is Mysore Junction railway station.

== Flyover ==
Hinkal flyover is popular since it is the first Flyover in Mysore. Inaugurated on 23 December 2018, the total length of flyover is 580m and width of the flyover is 17.2m. Service roads along the flyover are 6m wide with footpath width of 1.5m. It took more than 2 years for the construction of the flyover (which began on 22 June 2016). Hinkal Tent and Grand Mayura Hotel marks the starting and ending points of the flyover. While motorists are happy to use the facility, the shopkeepers, businessmen and hoteliers operating below the flyover are hit badly as they have lost business since most of the commuters use flyover instead of Service Road to avoid congestion at intersection and considerably narrow road.

== Water sources ==
=== Devarakere ===
Devarakere (Lake of God) is located next to historic Sri Nanneshwara swamy Temple, which had a campus of 42 acres out of which most of the land was acquired by Mysore Urban Development Authority. Lake once spread across 6.6 acre was the main water source in Hinkal. But unfortunately the lake was severely polluted by the flow of untreated sewage water and the Lake bed were encroached and left over area was later converted to unofficial dumping yard and also with construction debris being unloaded. As a result of encroachment of storm water drain, the low-lying areas of Tammadageri near Nanneshwara Temple are often flooded during monsoon season. Major inflow to the lake was from Hebbal Lake. Many Educational Institutions have come up along the periphery of the Lake, who tried to build illegal structures in Lake area and the activity was stayed by High Court. The revival of the lake was an initiative of the Shri Kshetra Dharmasthala Rural Development Project Trust, the organization is headed by Veerendra Heggade, the Dharmaadhikari of the Dharmasthala Temple. A rajakaluve (storm water drain) has been constructed to ensure that rainwater will increase the water level in the lake. Two gates are constructed across the rajakaluve to stop waste and garbage from entering the lake water. Steps have been built to allow the locals to use the lake water. Outflow from the lake will flows to Chaakanakere.

=== Chaakanakere ===
Surplus water from Devarakere flowed to Chaakanakere (Chakana's lake), which was once a source of drinking water for the residents of Hinkal, now face the threat from real estate developers, who are gradually encroaching it. Spread across 1.05 acres, the lake is owned by Grama Panchayat, which was claimed by Mysore Urban Development Authority.

== Local Government ==
Hinkal was considered as a Census Town in 2011 Indian Census. However the town was governed by Grama Panchayat. The proposal to merge Hinkal to Mysore City Corporation was rejected and later it was included to newly formed Hootagalli City Municipal Council on 26 November 2020.

== Education ==
A government school is located in Hinkal. Dharmasthala Temple Trust has set up RUDSET Institute dedicated for skill development at Hinkal which often organizes skill training programmes for the benefit of the unemployed youth within the age group of 18 to 48 years.

== Assault on traffic police ==
On 22 March 2021, a motorist died in a road accident and his pillion had sustained injuries when they were rammed by a Truck on the Ring Road aka NH 275K, near RMP Quarters, between Hinkal and Bhogadi. It was a wide spread message locally that the Traffic police tried to stop the Rider to verify the documents related to the vehicle. To escape from them, he tried to change the route. As a result, the Truck driver had no clue on this and unknowingly rammed the Motor cyclists resulting to the death of a Civil Contractor. Since Traffic police men were accused of causing death of Motorist, the locals took law to the hands and assaulted 5 Police men. Going forward, they used a Barricade to damage a Police vehicle Garuda, which used for regular Police rounds around the City to maintain discipline among the citizens and to check the ongoing crimes and also to regulate Traffic in the city. A day later the localities sat on protest against Police that the only intention of Police men is to collect money from motorists. But the fact is that fine will only be collected for Traffic rule violations. The pillion rider confirmed that neither Police men were responsible for the tragic incident nor they violated any Traffic rules. He also elaborated that Truck ran over them 250m before the Police check point and hence Police were not responsible for the incident. Police arrested two people in connection to the assault on their men and other 13 persons were put behind the bars on the next day. Police men were appreciated for admitting the Riders to Hospital Intime. A special Team was formed to nab the missing people who accused of vandalizing Police Vehicle. On 26 March 2021, Police Commissioner called for a press meet and clarified that Saving the Lives was their priority, not Meeting the Fine Collection Targets. One more accused was arrested and eight accused in the Videos were Identified by the Police. Aftermath, the Police changed the approach to check the documents and made it voluntary, hence leaving the choice to the Motorists.

== Demographics ==
According to the 2011 Indian Census, the town consists of 23,162 people. The town has a literacy rate of 82.60 percent which is higher than Karnataka's average of 75.36 percent.

Total Number of Household : 5990
| Population | Persons | Males | Females |
|---|---|---|---|
| Total | 23,162 | 11,830 | 11,332 |
| In the age group 0–6 years | 2,225 | 1,172 | 1,053 |
| Scheduled Castes (SC) | 2,097 | 1,046 | 1,051 |
| Scheduled Tribes (ST) | 2,053 | 1,026 | 1,027 |
| Literates | 17,293 | 9,286 | 8,007 |
| Illiterate | 5,869 | 2,544 | 3,325 |
| Total Worker | 9,285 | 7,109 | 2,176 |
| Main Worker | 7,820 | 6,174 | 1,646 |
| Main Worker - Cultivator | 56 | 53 | 3 |
| Main Worker - Agricultural Labourers | 38 | 30 | 8 |
| Main Worker - Household Industries | 89 | 58 | 31 |
| Main Worker - Other | 7,637 | 6,033 | 1,604 |
| Marginal Worker | 1,465 | 935 | 530 |
| Marginal Worker - Cultivator | 25 | 14 | 11 |
| Marginal Worker - Agriculture Labourers | 18 | 13 | 5 |
| Marginal Worker - Household Industries | 24 | 15 | 9 |
| Marginal Workers - Other | 1,398 | 893 | 505 |
| Marginal Worker (3-6 Months) | 1,072 | 688 | 384 |
| Marginal Worker - Cultivator (3-6 Months) | 25 | 14 | 11 |
| Marginal Worker - Agriculture Labourers (3-6 Months) | 13 | 9 | 4 |
| Marginal Worker - Household Industries (3-6 Months) | 10 | 5 | 5 |
| Marginal Worker - Other (3-6 Months) | 1,024 | 660 | 364 |
| Marginal Worker (0-3 Months) | 393 | 247 | 146 |
| Marginal Worker - Cultivator (0-3 Months) | 0 | 0 | 0 |
| Marginal Worker - Agriculture Labourers (0-3 Months) | 5 | 4 | 1 |
| Marginal Worker - Household Industries (0-3 Months) | 14 | 10 | 4 |
| Marginal Worker - Other Workers (0-3 Months) | 374 | 233 | 141 |
| Non Worker | 13,877 | 4,721 | 9,156 |

== Climate ==
The average rainfall per annum in the census town is 660.5 millimeters. The maximum temperature is 33°Celsius and minimum temperature is 12°Celsius.
