= Mysore City Corporation =

Local civic body in Mysuru, Karnataka, India

Mysuru City Corporation ಮೈಸೂರು ಮಹಾನಗರ ಪಾಲಿಕೆ Maisūru Mahānagara Pālike

Type
- Type: Municipal Corporation

History
- Founded: 8 July 1862 (164 years ago)

Leadership
- Municipal Commissioner: Lakshmikanth Reddy, IAS
- Mayor: Shivakumar; BJP since 06 September 2022
- Deputy Mayor: Dr Roopa G BJP since 6 September 2022
- Leader of the Opposition: Vacant
- Seats: 65

Elections
- Voting system: First-past-the-post
- Last election: 2018
- Next election: 2023

Motto
- ಕನ್ನಡವೇ ಸತ್ಯ; ಕನ್ನಡವೇ ನಿತ್ಯ(Kannada); Kannada is truth; Kannada Forever

Meeting place
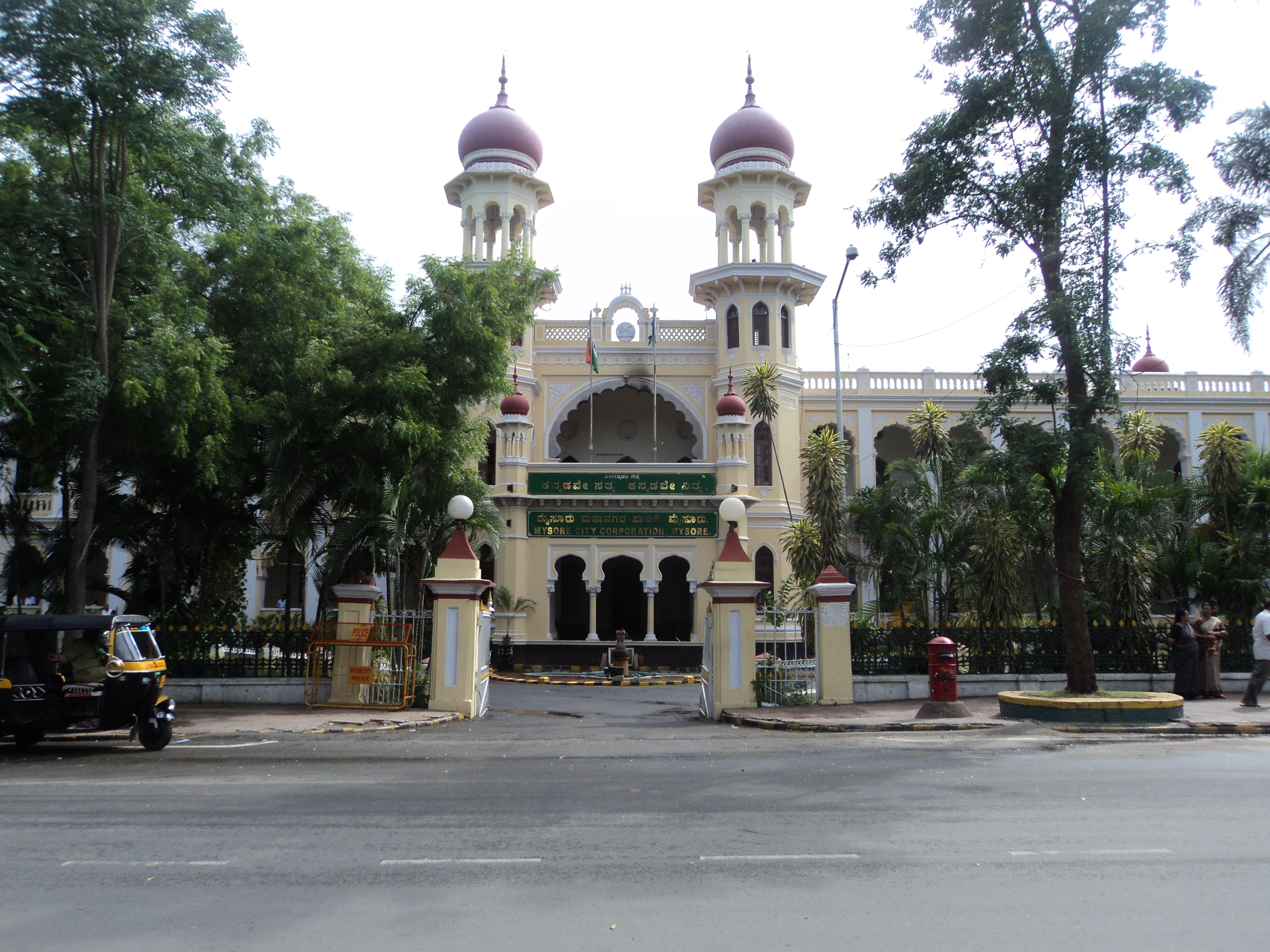
- Mysuru City Corporation Building, Sayyajirao Road, Agrahara, Chamarajapura, Mysuru, Karnataka, 570024

Website
- MCC

Footnotes
- Governed by: Karnataka Municipal Corporation Act, 1976

Mysore City Corporation (MCC), also known as Mysuru City Corporation, is the administrative body responsible for civic amenities and infrastructural assets of Mysuru in Karnataka, India. It is the third-largest municipal corporation in Karnataka, serving a population 920,550 in an area of 341.44 km^{2} (84,370 acres). The city's boundaries have expanded more than twice between 2010 and 2020.

== History ==
The MCC was created on 8 July 1862.

MCC was established as a municipality in 1888.

In 1977, MCC was converted into a corporation.

In July 2012, MCC celebrated 150 years of existence in Amba Vilas Palace, Mysore Palace.

== Organization ==
MCC is the third level of government below the national and state governments. MCC is run by the city council, which consists of elected representatives called "corporators", one from each of the wards of the city. Elections to the council are held every five years, results being decided by popular vote. Candidates for election to the council represent one or more of the state's political parties. A mayor is elected for a one-year term. Corporators hold their office for five years.

== Roles ==
MCC's duties include; the orderly development of the city, zoning, building regulations, health, hygiene, licensing, trade and education, and quality of life issues. It also oversees engineering works, and is responsible for health, sanitation, water supply, administration and taxation.

The corporation is headed by a mayor, who is assisted by commissioners and councillors. The annual budget of the corporation for the year 2011–2012 was ₹4.27 billion (equivalent to ₹9.6 billion or US$100 million in 2026). Among 63 cities covered under the Jawaharlal Nehru National Urban Renewal Mission, Mysore City Corporation was adjudged the second-best city municipal corporation and was given the Nagara Ratna award in 2011.

In partnership with Susthira, a non-governmental organization, MCC was due in 2020 to set up a plant to recycle construction waste and reserve 5 acres (0.020 km^{2}) of land near Koppaluru village on H D Kote Road for the project.

=== Response to the COVID-19 pandemic ===
The mayor and deputy mayor flagged off a mobile, doorstep greengrocer service that goes around the city throughout the day. The technicalities that earlier prohibited farmers from selling vegetables to the district Horticulture Producers Marketing and Processing Ltd (HOPCOMS) were resolved and MCC expanded the service to all 65 wards.

In a bid to prevent a rush at the vegetable market at MG Road, MCC moved it to Dasara Exhibition Grounds. To prevent the further spreading of SARS-Cov2, MCC decentralized the vegetable market to seven locations in the city and appointed officials to administer them.

COVID-19 brought more challenges in waste disposal and MCC took action to collect and dispose of waste. Waste collected from houses under quarantine was considered biomedical waste and the Corporation deployed nine vehicles to collect it. Waste was taken to the Common Bio-Medical Waste Processing Unit. Personal Protective Equipment (PPE) kits were provided to cleaning workers and vehicle drivers. Vehicles that were transporting waste were sprayed with hypochlorite solution and cleaned daily. The waste collected from quarantined houses was buried in a deep pit as per the instructions from the Ministry of Housing and Urban Affairs.

MCC, under Pradhan Mantri Street Vendor's AtmaNirbhar Nidhi (PM SVANidhi Scheme), organized a "Small Loan Mela", a special micro-credit facility for street vendors. Participants in the Small Loan Mela compulsorily carry their mobile number-linked Aadhaar card and bank passbook. Of the total 11 corporations in the State, MCC was in the first place in receiving applications and disbursing loans to eligible vendors. The schemes included a seven-percent subsidy in interest and a micro-credit facility without security. The vendors receive a cashback of ₹1,200 annually in case they do business using digital applications. They are entitled to more loan facilities in case of prompt repayment.

== Urban development ==
Urban growth and expansion are managed by the Mysore Urban Development Authority (MUDA), which is headed by a commissioner. Its activities include developing new layouts and roads, town planning, and land acquisition. One of the major projects undertaken by MUDA is the creation of an Outer Ring Road to ease traffic congestion. Residents of Mysore have criticized MUDA for its inability to prevent land mafias and ensure lawful distribution of housing land among city residents. The Chamundeshwari Electricity Supply Corporation is responsible for the city's electricity supply to the city.

A section of the MCC-owned Heritage Lansdowne Building, which was constructed on November 19, 1892, collapsed due to heavy rain in August 2012, killing four people. The vendors who had occupied the building were accommodated by MCC on the front side of the structure as a temporary arrangement.

A portion of the century-old Devaraja market in the city centre collapsed due to a lack of maintenance. A Soil Bearing Capacity (SBC) test was conducted; the report suggested strengthening the loose soil spot and constructing a drain to remove underground water, which required more time because of the varieties of soil and the large volume of water beneath the building. A proposal to rebuild the market at a budget of ₹70 crore was sent to the State Government for approval. Upon consent, the Corporation planned to test soil in other places. Members of the Heritage Committee gave permission to rebuild the market. A detailed report, including SBC report and a revised estimate, will be submitted to the State Government. In December 2020, Karnataka High Court stayed the demolition of Heritage buildings

MCC expanded its jurisdiction to include several villages on the city's outskirts such as Alanahalli, Srirampura, Chamundi Hill, Hootagalli and Hinkal due to presence of many industrial and commercial establishments in the erstwhile villages. 77 revenue layouts are planned to be included to MCC under the Akrama Sakrama Scheme, which will also increase the corporation's revenue.

Several areas outside the Outer Ring Road in Mysore have witnessed growth in the 2020s. There is a long-pending proposal to expand the jurisdiction of MCC to include eight-gram panchayats on the outskirts of Mysore in the expanded civic body into a "Bruhat Mysuru Mahanagara Palike" or "Greater Mysore’ in line with Bruhat Bengaluru Mahanagara Palike.

The localities of Vijayanagar Third Stage, Fourth Stage (First Phase), Garudachar Layout, Cauvery Layout, Wild Grass, Chennegowda Layout, Subramanyanagar and some of the areas adjoining the Ring Road, which was handed over to the MCC maintenance, but Khata was not yet issued. Both localities are now planned to be included in the newly formed Hootagalli City Municipal Council (HCMC).

As a result of urbanization, the area of water bodies in Mysore declined from 12.84 km^{2} (3,170 acres)^{2} (2.53%) to 9.42 km^{2} (2,330 acres) (1.86%) from 2000 to 2016. The net decrease was 3.42 km^{2} (850 acres), with an annual rate 0.21 km^{2} (52 acres). The forests declined from 11.25 km^{2} (2,780 acres) to 10 km^{2} (2,500 acres) and net decrease was 1.25 km^{2} (310 acres), with an annual rate of 0.08 km^{2} (20 acres). Mysore, which was popular as a Pensioners’ Paradise, is evolving into another metropolitan city.

=== Smart city initiative ===
MCC is proposing Mysore to be considered for a smart city project, which Davanagere, Belagavi, Tumakuru, Hubballi-Dharwad, Shivamogga, Mangalore, and Bengaluru are already a part of. Under the scheme, the selected cities will receive ₹500 crore each from the central government and a matching grant from the state for several initiatives. MCC had provided all of the details of its smart city mission parameters needed for inclusion in the scheme, including its mobilization of resources, internal resources gathering, service capabilities management, number of individual toilets per household, public participation in the development of the city, audited account details, use of government funds and self-financing capacity.

== Cleanliness, drinking water and sanitation ==
Drinking water for Mysore is sourced from the Kaveri and Kabini rivers. The city got its first piped water supply when the Belagola project was commissioned in 1896. As of 2011, Mysore gets 193,000 cubic metres (42.5 million imperial gallons) of water per day. Mysore sometimes faces water crises, mainly from March to June, and in years of low rainfall. The city has had an underground drainage system since 1904. The city's sewerage drains into the Kesare, Malalavadi, Dalavai and Belavatha valleys. In an exercise carried out by the Urban Development Ministry under the national urban sanitation policy, Mysore was rated the second-cleanest city in India in 2010 and the cleanest in Karnataka.

Under the 14th Finance Scheme, MCC installed e-toilets that cost a ₹5 coin to use around the city. These were prominently established near busy places, including the Central Business District (CBD). At many places, thieves have stolen pipes, taps and other accessories from these e-toilets due to absence of security. To publicize the Swach Bharat ("A Cleanliness awareness drive"), MCC chose former cricketer and match referee Javagal Srinath.

Mysore was judged the cleanest city of India in 2015 and 2016 by Swachh Bharat Mission, and emerged as second-cleanest in 2010. Mysore was declared the cleanest among medium-sized cities in 2018 and 2020, and was second in the same category in 2019.

== Politics ==
Mysore city is divided into 65 wards and the council members, also known as corporators, are elected by residents of Mysore every five years. The council members, in turn, elect the mayor. Residents of Mysore elect four representatives to the Legislative assembly of Karnataka through the constituencies of Chamaraja, Krishnaraja, Narasimharaja and Chamundeshwari. Mysore city, being part of the larger Mysore Lok Sabha constituency, also elects one member to the Lok Sabha, the lower house of the Parliament of India. Politics in the city is dominated by three political parties; the Indian National Congress (INC), the Bharatiya Janata Party (BJP) and the Janata Dal (Secular) (JDS).

== Revenue sources ==
The following are the Income sources for the corporation from the Central and State Government.

=== Revenue from taxes ===
Following is the Tax related revenue for the corporation.

- Property tax.
- Profession tax.
- Entertainment tax.
- Grants from Central and State Government like Goods and Services Tax.
- Advertisement tax.

=== Revenue from non-tax sources ===
Following is the Non Tax related revenue for the corporation.

- Water usage charges.
- Fees from Documentation services.
- Rent received from municipal property.
- Funds from municipal bonds.

=== Revenue from taxes ===
Following is the Tax related revenue for the corporation.

- Property tax.
- Profession tax.
- Entertainment tax.
- Grants from Central and State Government like Goods and Services Tax.
- Advertisement tax.

=== Revenue from non-tax sources ===
Following is the Non Tax related revenue for the corporation.

- Water usage charges.
- Fees from Documentation services.
- Rent received from municipal property.
- Funds from municipal bonds.

=== List of mayors and deputy mayors ===
Mayors
Sl	Name	Party	Tenure	Ward number	Ward name	Reservation category
1	P. Vishwanath		1983-1984			
2	R. J. Narasimha Iyengar		1985-1986			
5	H. S. Shankaralinge Gowda	Janata Party	1988-1989			General
16	T. B Chikkanna		2001-2002			
19			2004-2005			
20	Bharathi	Indian National Congress	2005-2006			
21	H. N. Srikantaiah		30 September 2007- 29 September 2008			
22	Ayub Khan	Indian National Congress	2008-2009			
23			2009-2010			
24	Sandesh Swamy	Janata Dal (Secular)	22 April 2010 -21 May 2011			
25	Pushpalatha T. B. Chikkanna	Janata Dal (Secular)	29 April 2011- 28 April 2012	24		
26	Rajeshwari M C	Indian National Congress	30 April 2012 – 29 April 2013			
27	N. M. Rajeshwari Somu	Janata Dal (Secular)	5 September 2013 - 4 September 2014	33		General (Women)
28	R. Lingappa		9 October 2014 - 8 October 2015			
29			2015-2016			
30	M. J. Ravikumar	Janata Dal (Secular)	7 December 2016 - 6 December 2017	35		
31	S. Bhagyavathi	Indian National Congress (Later Janata Dal (Secular))	24 January 2018 - 17 November 2018	23	Jayalakshmipuram	Scheduled Caste (Women)
32	Pushpalatha Jagannath	Indian National Congress	17 November 2018 - 17 November 2019	11	Shanthinagar (Mahadevapura Road)	
33	Tasneem Bano	Janata Dal (Secular)	18 January 2020 - 17 January 2021	26	Meena Bazaar	Backward Class A (Women)
34	Rukmini Madegowda	Janata Dal (Secular)	24 February 2021 – 26 May 2021 (disqualified)	36	Yeraganahalli (Ambedkar Colony)	General (Women)
-	Anwar Baig	Indian National Congress	3 June 2021 – 25 August 2021 (acting)	10	Rajiv Nagar	Deputy Mayor Anwar Baig was an acting Mayor till Mayoral election necessitated after 2018 corporator election of incumbent Mayor Rukmini Madegowda was disqualified by High Court on 26 May 2021
35	Sunanda Palanetra	Bharatiya Janata Party	25 August 2021 – 23 February 2022	59	Kuvempunagar ‘M’ Block	General (Women)
60	Shivakumar	Bharatiya Janata Party	6 September 2022 - 5 September 2023	47	Kuvempunagar	Backward Class A

Deputy mayors
Name	Party	Tenure	Ward number	Ward name	Reservation category
		2005-2006			
		2006-2007			
H. M. Shanthakumari		30 September 2007- 29 September 2008			
		2008-2009			
		2009-2010			
Pushpalatha Jagannath	Indian National Congress	22 April 2010 -21 May 2011			
M. J. Ravikumar	Janata Dal (Secular)	2011-2012			
Mahadevappa	Janata Dal (Secular)	30 April 2012 – 29 April 2013			
V. Shailendra	Janata Dal (Secular)	5 September 2013 - 4 September 2014	9		Scheduled Caste
		9 October 2014 - 8 October 2015			
		2015-2016			
Rathna Lakshman	Bharatiya Janata Party	7 December 2016 - 6 December 2017			
Indira Mahesh	Janata Dal (Secular)	24 January 2018 - 17 November 2018	61	Kyathamaranahalli	Scheduled Tribe (Women)
Shafi Ahmed	Janata Dal (Secular)	18 November 2018 - 17 November 2019	31	Kanteerava Narasimharaja Pura (Ghousianagar)	Backward Class A
C. Sridhar	Indian National Congress	18 January 2020 - 17 January 2021	38	Giriyabovipalya	Scheduled Caste
Anwar Baig	Indian National Congress	24 February 2021 – Present	10	Rajiv Nagar	General
Dr. G. Roopa	Bharatiya Janata Party	6 September 2022 - 5 September 2023	53	Kurubarahalli	Backward Class A

=== List of commissioners ===
Commissioners of Mysore City Corporation
Name	Tenure	Remarks
P. Manivannan	14 November 2007	
K. H. Jagadeesha	February 17, 2019	
Shilpa Nag	February 17, 2019 - July 2019	
P. S. Kantharaju	July 2019 - August 2019	Additional charge along with MUDA Commissioner role
Gurudatta Hegde	August 17, 2019 - February 16, 2021	
Shilpa Nag	February 16, 2021 - 6 June 2021	
G. Lakshmikanth Reddy	6 June 2021 – Present	

=== List of corporators ===
Councilors of Mysore
Zone	Ward number	Ward name	Areas Covered	Assembly Constituency	Reservation category	Corporator name	Party	Remarks
	1	Hebbal, Lakshmikanthanagar			Backward Class A Woman	B. Lakshmi		
	2	Manchegowdanakoppalu			General	Prema		
	3	Mahadeswara Extension			Backward Class B Woman	K.V.Sridhar		
	4	Hebbal, Loknayaknagar			General	Pailavan Srinivas		
	5	Kumbarakoppalu			Backward Class A	Usha		
	6	Gokulam			General Woman	SBM Manju		
	7	Metagalli			Scheduled Caste	V. Ramesh		
	8	Bannimantap HUDCO Layout			General	Akmal Pasha		
	9	Kesare			Backward Class B	Samiulla Khan		
	10	Rajiv Nagar			Backward Class B Woman	Anwar Baig		
	11	Shantinagar (Mahadevapura Road)			General	Pushpalatha		
	12	Shantinagar (Indira Gandhi Road)			General Woman	Ayaj Pasha		
	13	Udayagiri			Backward Class B	Ayub Khan		
	14	Satyanagar			Backward Class A Woman	Savud Khan		
	15	Rajendranagar			Scheduled Caste	Pradeep Chandra		
	16	Subashnagar			Backward Class A	Arif Husen		
	17	Bannimantap			General	Reshma Bhanu		
	18	Yadavagiri			Scheduled Tribe	Guru Vinayak		
	19	Jayalakshmipuram (V.V. Mohalla)			Backward Class A Woman	Bhagya Madesh		
	20	Vijayanagar			General	M.U.Subaiah		
	21	Gangothri			General Woman	C. Vedavathi		
	22	Paduvarahalli			Scheduled Caste Woman	Namratha		
	23	Subbarayanakere			Backward Class A	M. Pramila		
	24	Mandi Mohalla			General	C.Ramesh		
	25	Tilak Nagar			General	R.Rangaswamy		
	26	Meena Bazar			General Woman	Tasneem Bano		
	27	Veeranagere			Backward Class A Woman	Mohamad RaPhik		
	28	Gandhinagar			Backward Class A	Dr. Ashwini		
	29	N.R. Mohalla			General	Syad Hasarathulla		
	30	Kyathmaranahalli			Backward Class A Woman	Usha		
	31	Kanteerava Narasimharajapura (Ghousianagar)			General	Shaphi Ahamed		
	32	Ghousianagar ‘A’ Block (Osmania)			General	Shanthakumari		
	33	Azeez Sait Nagar			General	Bashir Ahamed		
	34	Kalyanagiri			General	Hajeera Seema		
	35	Sathagalli Layout First Stage			Backward Class A	Sathvik		
	36	Yeraganahalli (Ambedkar Colony)			Backward Class A Woman	Rukmini Madegowda	Janata Dal (Secular)	Became Mayor on 24 February 2021. Disqualified as Mayor and Corporator on 26 May 2021 by High Court
	36	Yeraganahalli (Ambedkar Colony)			Backward Class A Woman	Rajani Annaiah	Indian National Congress	Wins By-Poll on 6 September 2021, necessitated after disqualification of Rukmini Madegowda as a Corporator on 26 May 2021 by High Court
	37	Raghavendranagar			Backward Class A	Ashwini		
	38	Giriyabovipalya			Scheduled Caste	C.Sridhar		
	39	Gayatripuram First Stage			Scheduled Caste Woman	Sathyaraj		
	40	Lashkar Mohalla			Backward Class A Woman	M.Sathish		
	41	Devaraja Mohalla			General	R.Nagaraj		
	42	K.G. Koppalu			General Woman	M.Shivakumar		
	43	T.K. Layout			General Woman	Gopi		
	44	Janathanagar			General Woman	Savitha		
	45	Sharadadevinagar			General	K.Nirmala		
	46	Dattagalli			General	M.Lakshmi		
	47	Kuvempunagar			Backward Class A	Shivakumar		
	48	Jayanagar			Scheduled Tribe Woman	M.S.Shobha		
	49	Lakshmipuram			Backward Class A Woman	N.Sowmya		
	50	Sunnadakeri			Scheduled Tribe	V.Lokesh		
	51	Agrahara			Backward Class A	B.V.Manjunath		
	52	Ittigegud			General	Chayadevi		
	53	Kurubarahalli			Backward Class A	Roopa		
	54	Gundu Rao Nagar			General Woman	Puttanigamma		
	55	Chamundipuram			General Woman	M.V.Ramaprasad		
	56	Krishnamurthypuram			General Woman	Begum (Palavi)		
	57	Kuvempunagar-CITB			General Woman	M.C.Ramesh		
	58	Ramakrishnagar			General Woman	Sharath Kumar		
	59	Kuvempunagar ‘M’ Block			General Woman	Sunanda Palanetra	Bharatiya Janata Party	
	60	Ashokapuram			General Woman	Bhuvaneshwari		
	61	Vidyaranyapuram			General Woman	Shobha		
	62	Vishweshwaranagar			Scheduled Caste Woman	Shanthamma		
	63	J.P. Nagar			Scheduled Caste Woman	Sharadamma		
	64	Aravindnagar			General Woman	Champaka		
	65	Srirampura			Scheduled Caste	Geetha		

== See also ==
- Karnataka
- Mysore
- Municipal corporation
