= National Highway 275K (India) =

National Highway in India

National Highway 275K
- Mysore Ring Road
- Map of National Highway 275K in red

Route information
- Auxiliary route of NH 75
- Length: 41.5 km (25.8 mi)

Major junctions
- From: Hinkal
- To: Hinkal

Location
- Country: India
- States: Karnataka

Highway system
- Roads in India; Expressways; National; State; Asian
← NH 275	→ NH 275

National Highway 275K (NH 275K) is a national highway in India. It is a secondary route of National Highway 75. NH-275K runs in the state of Karnataka in India. This national highway forms the Mysore Ring Road around Mysore city.its old name is National Highway 75.

== Route ==
NH275K forms the Mysore Ring Road connecting Hinkal, Columbia Asia Hospital, APMC Bandipalya, and back to Hinkal around Mysore city.

== Junctions ==
NH 275 Terminal near Hinkal.
NH 150A near Columbia Asia Hospital
NH 275 near Columbia Asia Hospital
NH 766 near Naranahali
NH 150A near APMC Bandipalya
NH 275 Terminal near Hinkal.

== Map ==
Mysore Ring Road main junctions

== See also ==
- List of national highways in India
- List of national highways in India by state
