= Hebbal Lake, Mysore =

Lake in the city of Mysore, India

Hebbal Lake
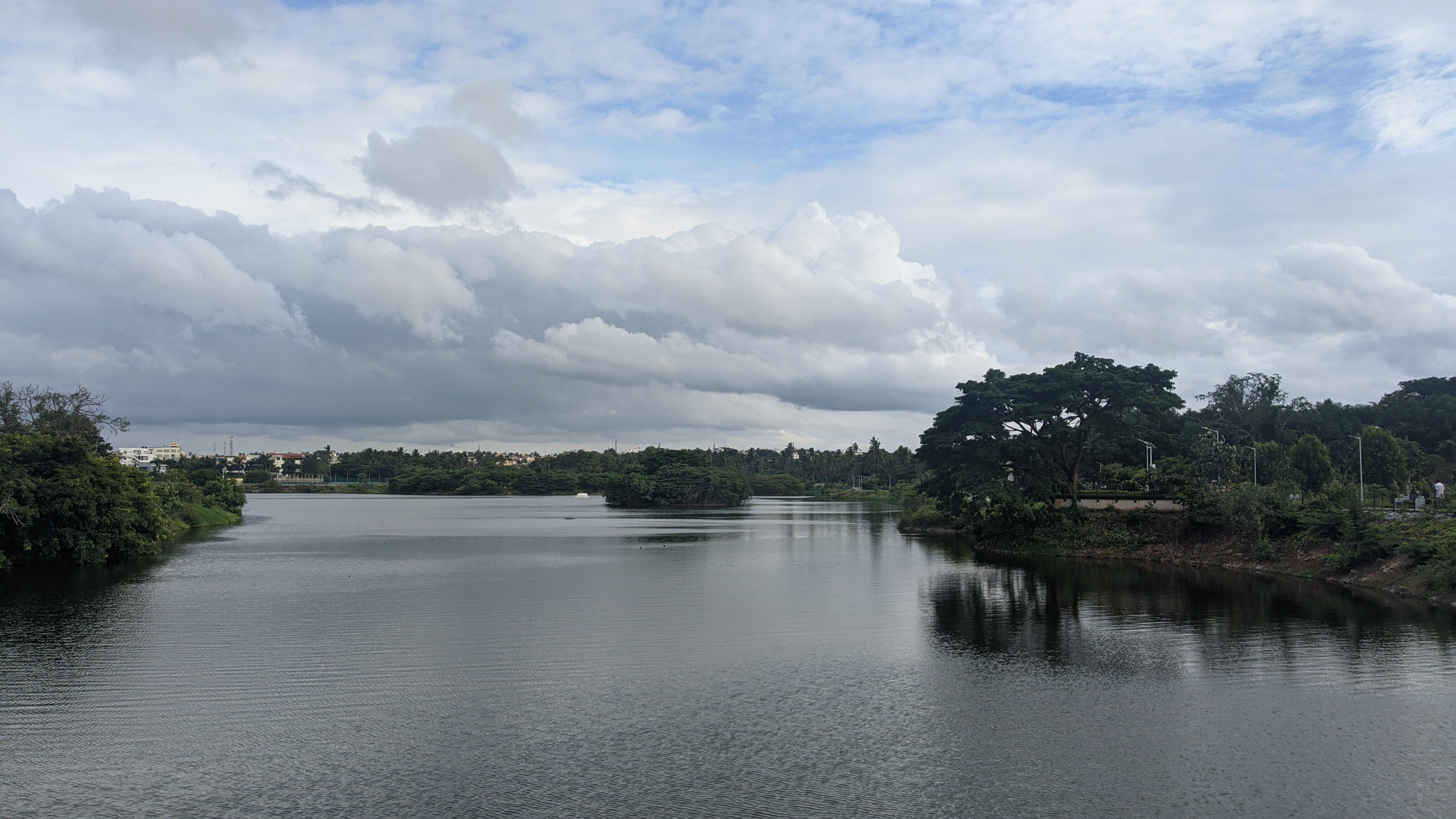

- Location within Karnataka
- Location: Mysore, Karnataka, India
- Coordinates: 12°21′30.2″N 76°36′37.7″E
- Primary outflows: Devarakere
- Basin countries: India
- Max. length: 550 m (1,800 ft)
- Max. width: 600 m (2,000 ft)
- Surface area: 48 acres (19 ha)
- Settlements: Mysore

Hebbal Lake is a lake in the city of Mysore, India.

== Flora and Fauna ==
The lake is host to many migratory birds. Many bird watching points are located along the circumference of the lake, and there is a viewing point on an accessible small island. Fruiting plants like Azima Tetracantha, Cordia Dichotoma are on the banks. Flowering Flora like Cleome Viscosa, Ipomoea Cairica are found.

== Rejuvenation ==
Hebbal lake was highly polluted by the inflow of industrial effluents, sewerage and refuse. A recovery project is underway to set up a sewage treatment plan and tackle the pollution problem. Sudha Murthy, Chairperson, Infosys Foundation and district administration signed a Memorandum of Understanding (MoU) for conserving the lake. The rejuvenation project, which is projected to last for 15 months, started in February 2021. Infosys foundation installed 6 Aerators in Hebbal Lake on 24 March 2021, following the death of Fishes.

=== Call for restoration of over flow area ===
The farmers were worried on the problems such as over-dampness of agricultural fields below the lake due to seepage of water and sewage water released to fields causing diseases to coconut trees and brought this matter to the district in-charge minister S. T. Somashekhar on 10 August 2021.

== See also ==
- Hebbal
