= Kalaburagi Ring Road =

Ring road in Kalaburagi, India

Route information
- Maintained by Karnataka Road Development Corporation Limited, Kalaburagi Municipal Corporation, Karnataka Public Works Department
- Length: 22.5 km (14.0 mi)

Location
- Country: India
- States: Karnataka
- Major cities: Kalaburagi

Highway system
- Roads in India; Expressways; National; State; Asian

The Kalaburagi Ring Road is a 22.5-kilometer (14.0 mi) long, four-laned ring road in the city of Kalaburagi.

All trucks, buses, and heavy vehicles in the town are diverted via the Ring Road.

== See also ==
- Mysore Ring Road
