= Tasneem Bano =

Indian politician

Mayor of Mysore City Corporation
- Incumbent
- Assumed office 2020

Personal details
- Party: Janata Dal (Secular)
- Spouse: Syed Samiulla
- Parent: Munnavar Pasha (Father) Tahseen Banu (Mother)

Tasneem Bano is the first Muslim women Mayor of Mysore City Corporation in its long history spanning 158 years. She is a politician from Janata Dal (Secular)

== Early life and background ==
Bano was born to Munnavar Pasha (a tailor) and Tahseen Banu (a homemaker). She completed her bachelor's degree in Arts from Maharani's College, Mysore.

== Personal life ==
Bano married to Syed Samiulla. The couple has two children. Her uncle Alhaj Naseeruddin Babu was a three-time corporator in Mysore.

== Political career ==
Bano started as a politician from Indian National Congress and made an electoral in March 2013 by being a candidate from Ward 26 – Meena Bazaar, a ward then reserved for Women from Backward Classes category. In 2018, she shifted her loyalty to Janata Dal (Secular) and supported them at the state assembly elections. She was the candidate of Congress-JD(S) alliance in Mysore City Corporation Election at the age of 31. She was appointed as Mayor on 18 January 2020 and became the 22nd Mayor of Mysuru. She defeated Geetha Yoganand of Bharatiya Janata Party's (BJP) in Mayor Election. Her appointment came at a time when union ministry tried to implement CAA-NRC in the country.

== Controversies ==
Bano entered into open conflicts with Deputy Commissioner Rohini Sinduri and parliament member Pratap Simha for mistreating her.
