= Lansdowne Building =

Coordinates: 12.307481055360874°N 76.65261568337507°E

- Interactive map of the Lansdowne Building area
- Former names: Range Bazaar

General information
- Location: Mysore, India, Mysore, India
- Completed: 19 November 1892
- Owner: Mysore City Corporation

Lansdowne Building, initially called Range Bazaar, is a commercial complex and a heritage building in Mysore, India.

This over-a-century old building was built to facilitate basic needs in commercial spaces such as pharmacy, refreshment rooms, bookstalls, hotel, printing presses, desktop publishing, letter typing, stationery, photo framing and wallpaper outlets, and other business establishments. The structure was built using wood, iron, limestone and around 200 girders. Kannada poet D. V. Gundappa called it the "ornamental festoon of the city".

== History ==
The building was commissioned by Maharaja Chamarajendra Wadiyar X to honour the visit of the Viceroy and Governor General of India Henry Petty-Fitzmaurice, the Marquess of Lansdowne.

== Building collapse ==
Mysore City Corporation, the gatekeeper of the building, had formed a committee in the 2000s, headed by Sangameshwara, the then-Principal of Sri Jayachamarajendra College of Engineering, to study the fate of the structure. It was reported that the building was dilapidated and could sustain damages during the ensuing monsoon. A part of the building collapsed in August 2012, killing 4 people; following this, a task force committee was formed by the Government of Karnataka for restoration. Before the restoration could be completed, an arch at the Devaraja Market collapsed on 28 August 2016, resulting in halting of the restoration process at Lansdowne Building, too. Reconstruction of both Lansdowne Building and Devaraja Market are awaited, and it was estimated that INR 135 crore (US$18mn) may be invested for the purpose.

== See also ==
- List of Heritage Buildings in Mysore
