= Pushpalatha Jagannath =

Indian politician

- Occupation: Politician
- Known for: 21st mayor of Mysore, India

Pushpalatha Jagannath is an Indian politician and the 21st mayor of Mysore between 2019-2020 and a former Deputy Mayor.

== Career ==
Jagannath is an Indian National Congress politician. In November 2018. In 2010, she became a Deputy Mayor of Mysore. She became the 21st Mayor of Mysore. She contested from ward no 11 at Mysore, where she contested for the second time.
