= Hootagalli =

Coordinates: 12°20′N 76°35′E

- City
- Hootagalli City Municipal Council
- Aerial view of Skyline

- Location of Hootagalli in Karnataka Hootagalli (India) Hootagalli (Asia)
- Country: India
- State: Karnataka
- Division: Mysore division
- District: Mysuru district

Government
  - Type: City Municipal Council
  - Body: Hootagalli City Municipal Council

Area
  - Total: 28.48 km^{2} (11.00 sq mi)
- Elevation: 780 m (2,560 ft)

Population
  - Total: 56,876
  - Density: 1,997/km^{2} (5,172/sq mi)
- Time zone: UTC+05:30 (IST)

Hootagalli or Hutagalli is a city and a suburb of Mysuru, situated in the Mysuru metropolitan area in Mysore district of Karnataka, India. Hootagalli is located in the outskirts of the city of Mysuru and forms a continuous urban area. Hootagalli city municipal council consists of previous census towns of Hinkal, Hootagalli and Gram Panchyats of Koorgalli and Belavadi totally covering an area of 28.48 square km. In November 2020, the government of Karnataka approved the formation of Hootagalli City Municipal Council by merging four gram panchayats. The initial plan was to include it with MCC to form Greater Mysuru City Corporation (BMMP) however, due to MCC disputing the proposal, a separate body was created. According to 2011 census, the city municipal council has combined population of 56,876. On November 26, 2020, a gazetted notification was passed making the CMC official.

== Infrastructure ==
Hootagalli City Municipal Council is well connected to the city of Mysore through Mysore-Bantwal National Highway. It consists of the only flyover located in the urban agglomeration of Mysore. Various civic amenities like drinking water, roads and housing are taken care. Hootagalli also consists of a well planned layout by Karnataka Housing Board.

== Economy ==
Hootagalli Industrial Area consists of various manufacturing companies like Meritor-Kalyani Automotive Axles, Rane Madras, Reckitt Benckiser, Lunars, RPG Cables. It also consists of various IT companies like Infosys, Wipro Infotech, L&T Infotech, Excelsoft etc. In 2011 census year, the city generate revenue of 12 crores.

== Education and Healthcare ==
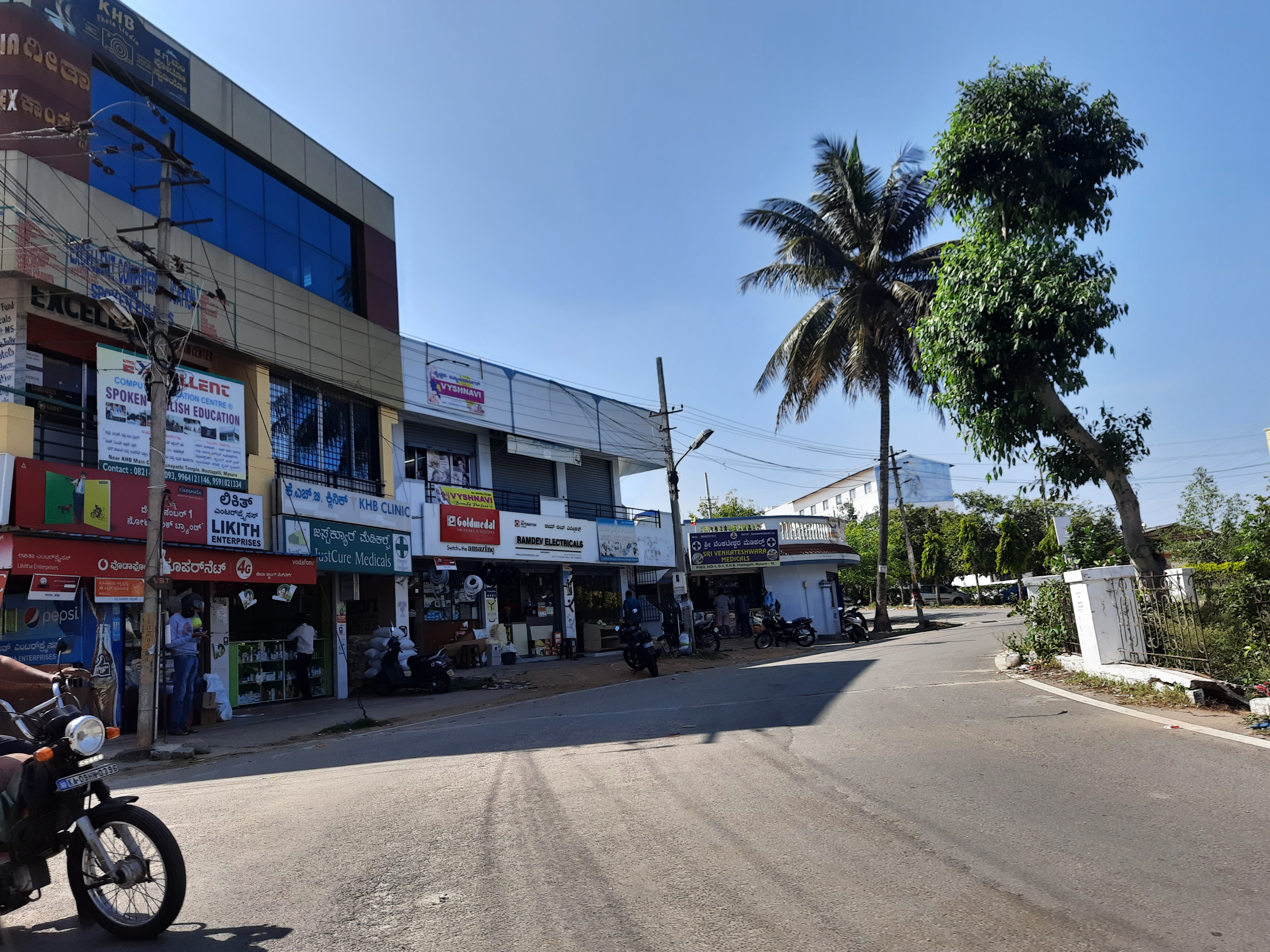
KHB Colony

Hootagalli City Municipal Council consists of various schools like East West International, Pushkarni, Excel Public School etc. It also has connectivity to various education institutes present in and around the city of Mysuru. NIE Institute of Technology engineering college is located in Hootagalli Industrial Area.

Various Institutes are:

- NIE Institute of Technology
- East West International
- Pushkarni
- Excel Public School
- Notre Dame School
- Daksha PU College
- Rotary Midtown
- Govt Women’s First Grade College

Various Hospitals in and around Hootagalli are

- Pralaksha Hospital
- Supriya Hospital
- Annapurna Eye Hospital

It is also well connected to Hospitals like

- Columbia Asia
- Chandrakala Hospital
- Brindavan Hospital
- Jayadeva hospital

== Transport ==
It is well connected with Mysore city buses with many buses available from City Bus Stand.KSRTC buses going towards Madikeri or Hassan will also stop. The nearest railway station is Belagola which is 7 km away but only slow trains stop. The nearest big station where is Mysore Junction railway station which is 9 km from the town. The nearest airport to the suburb is Mysore Airport and nearest international airport is Kempegowda International Airport in Bengaluru.

Major Roads that pass through or originate at Hootagalli are

- NH275 Mysuru-Mangalore Road, Flyover at Ring Road Junction
- KRS Road via BEML
- Infosys Road
- RPG Cables Road
- KHB Colony Main Road
- Outer Ring Road

== Localities ==
Hinkal Town, Mysore

=== Residential ===
- Hootagalli
- KHB Colony
- Hinkal
- Koorgalli
- Belavadi
- Vijayanagar 4th Stage (Part of the layout)
- SRS Colony
- Vinayaka Enclave

=== Industrial Areas ===
- Hootagalli Industrial Area
- Hebbal Industrial Area
- Koorgalli Industrial Area
- Belavadi Industrial Area

== Landmarks ==
- Foundation Silver Springs
- Yashaswi Convention Hall
- Saraswathi Convention Hall
- Infosys Mysore
- CESC Receiving Station
- Infant Jesus Church
- MUDA Park
- Sowparnika Royal Splendor

== Demographics ==
According to the 2011 Indian Census, Hutagalli census town consisted of 18,308 people, Belavadi village consisted of 6,995 people, Hinkal census town consisted of 23,162 people, Koorgalli census town consisted of 7,065 people. Population of the area grew from 31,991 in 2001 to 56,876 in 2011. The projected population of the proposed city municipal council using the growth rate of each constituent town or village is 105,982 in 2020. The density of population is 1,996 people per square kilometer. 99% of the population indulge in non agricultural activities.

2001-31,991.

2011-56,876.

== Gallery ==
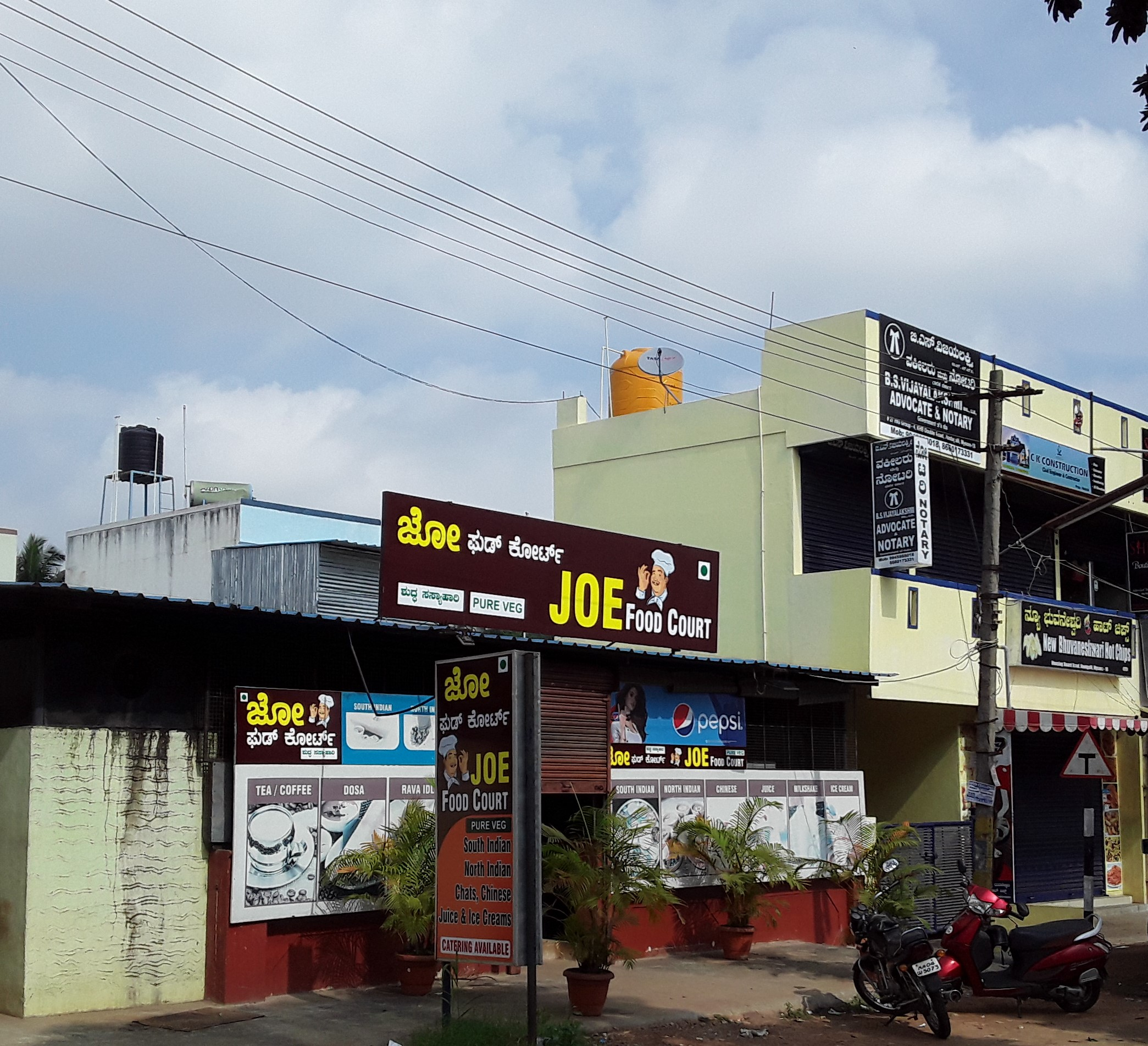

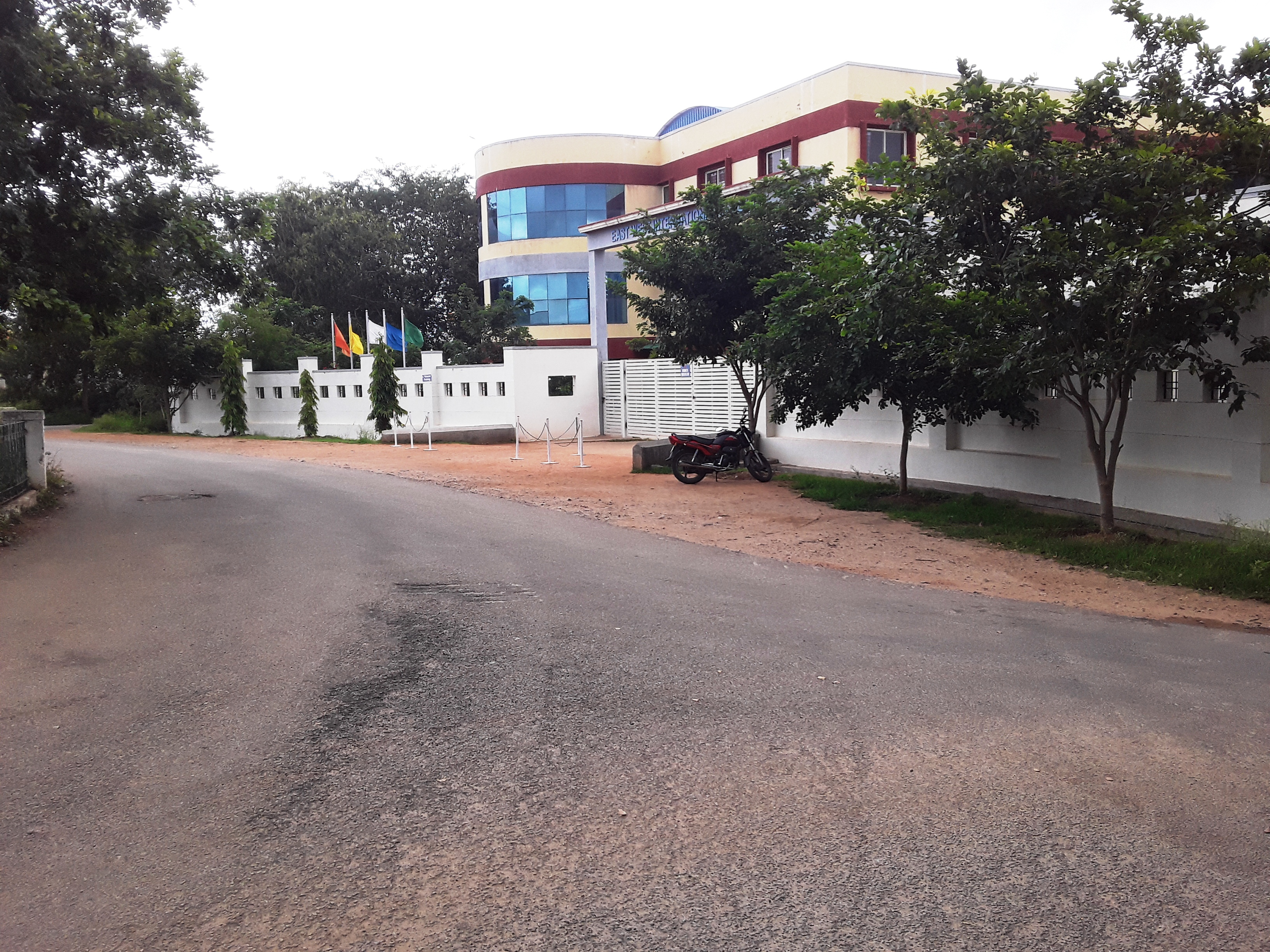

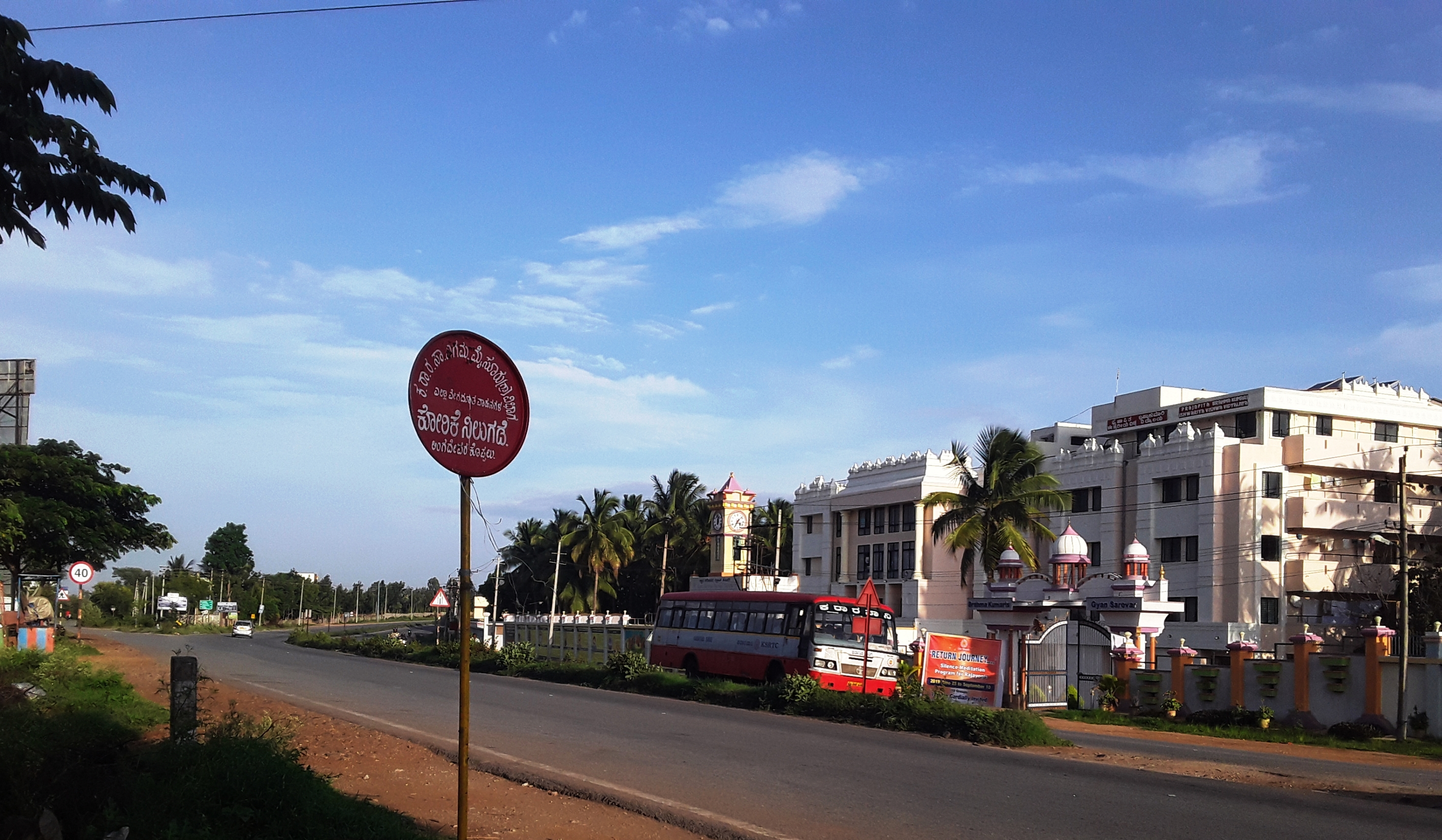

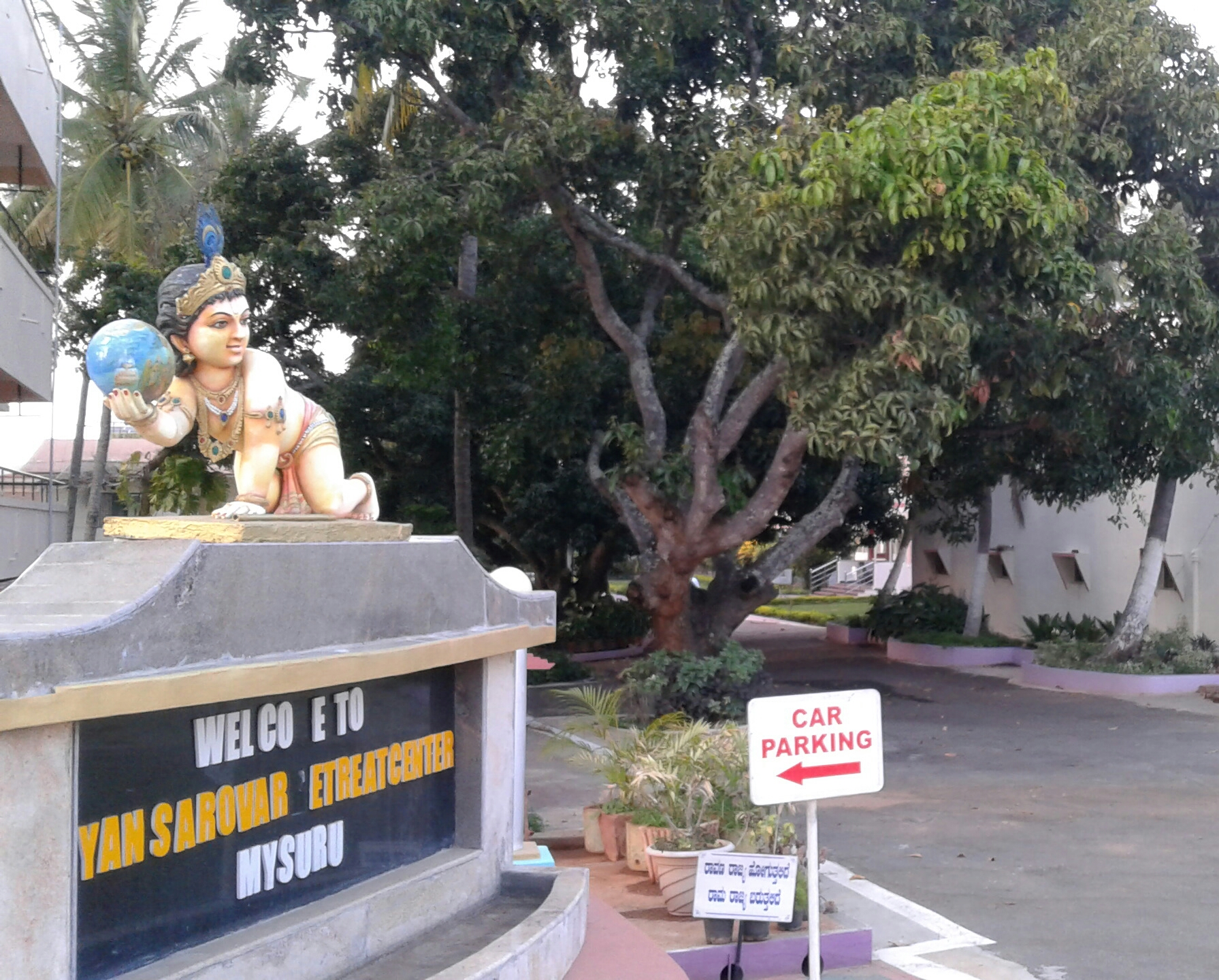

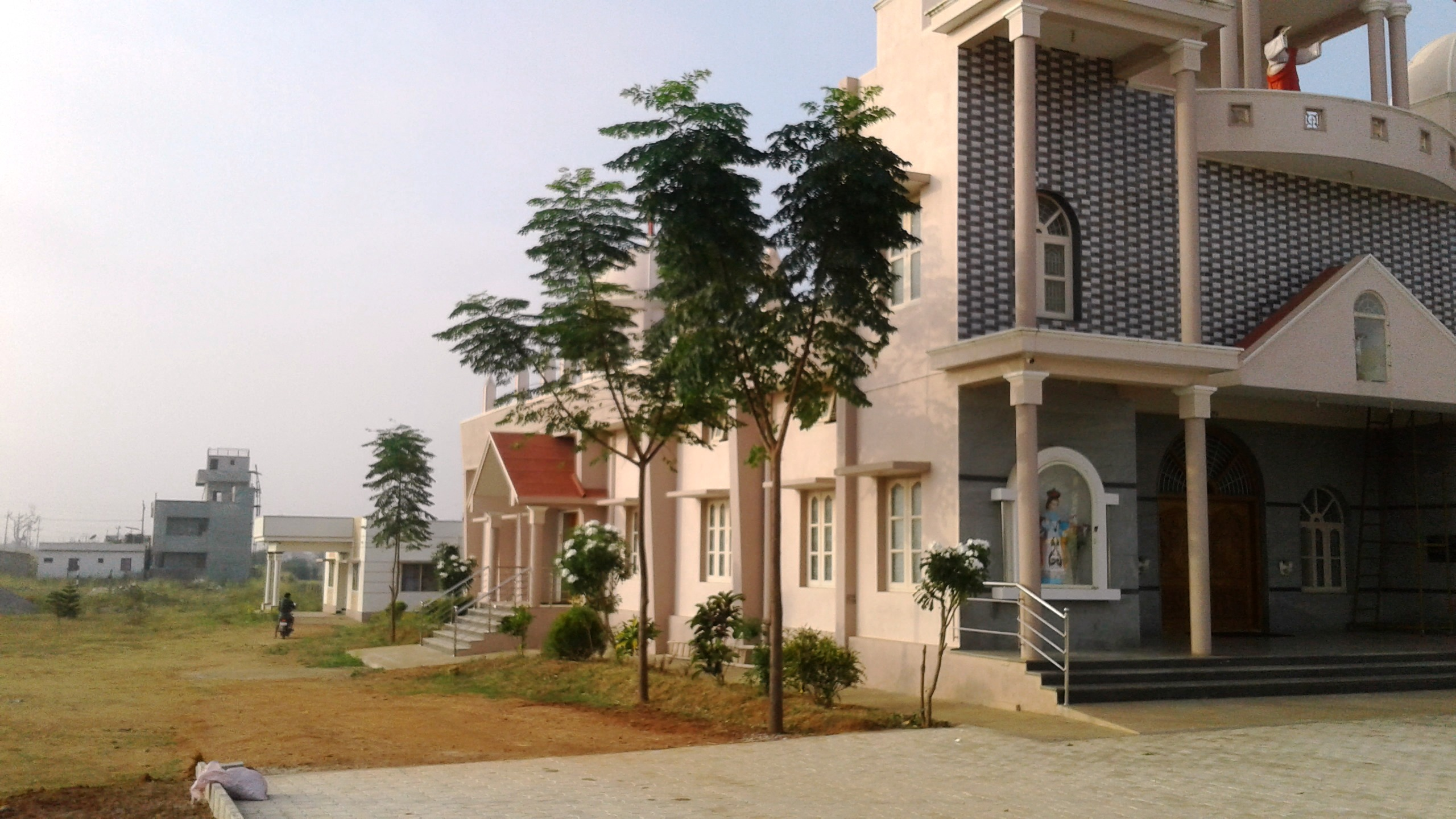

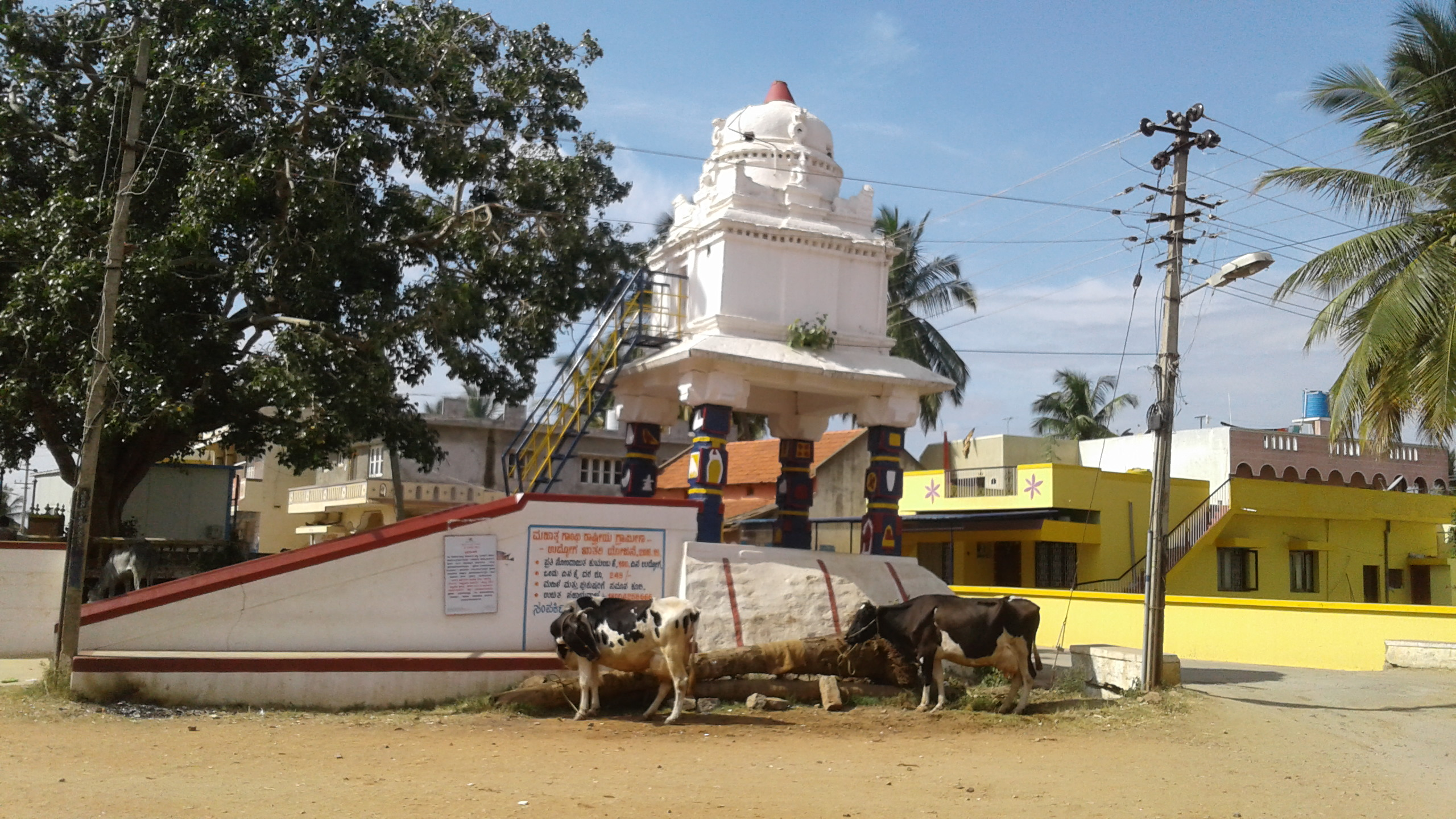

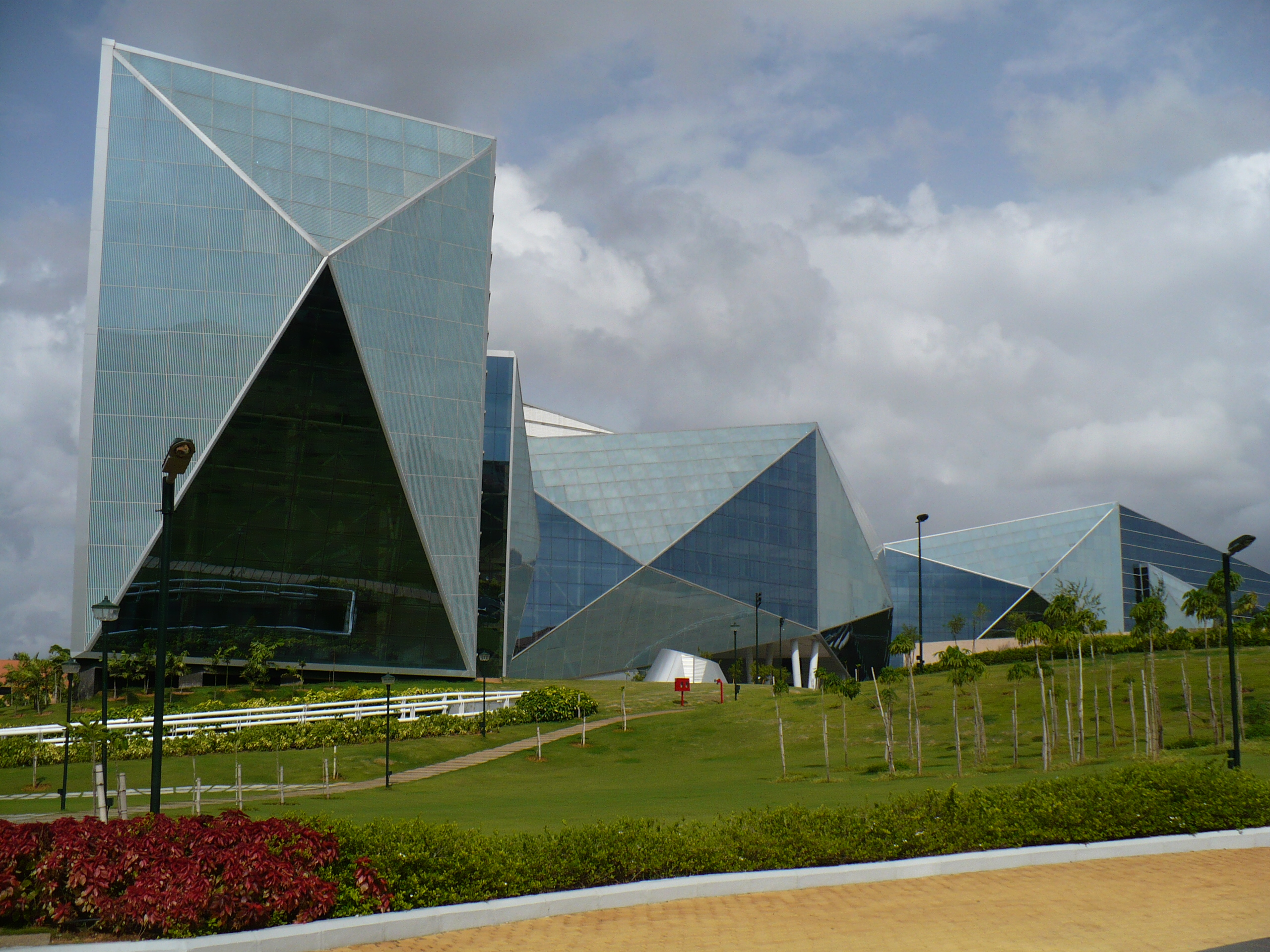

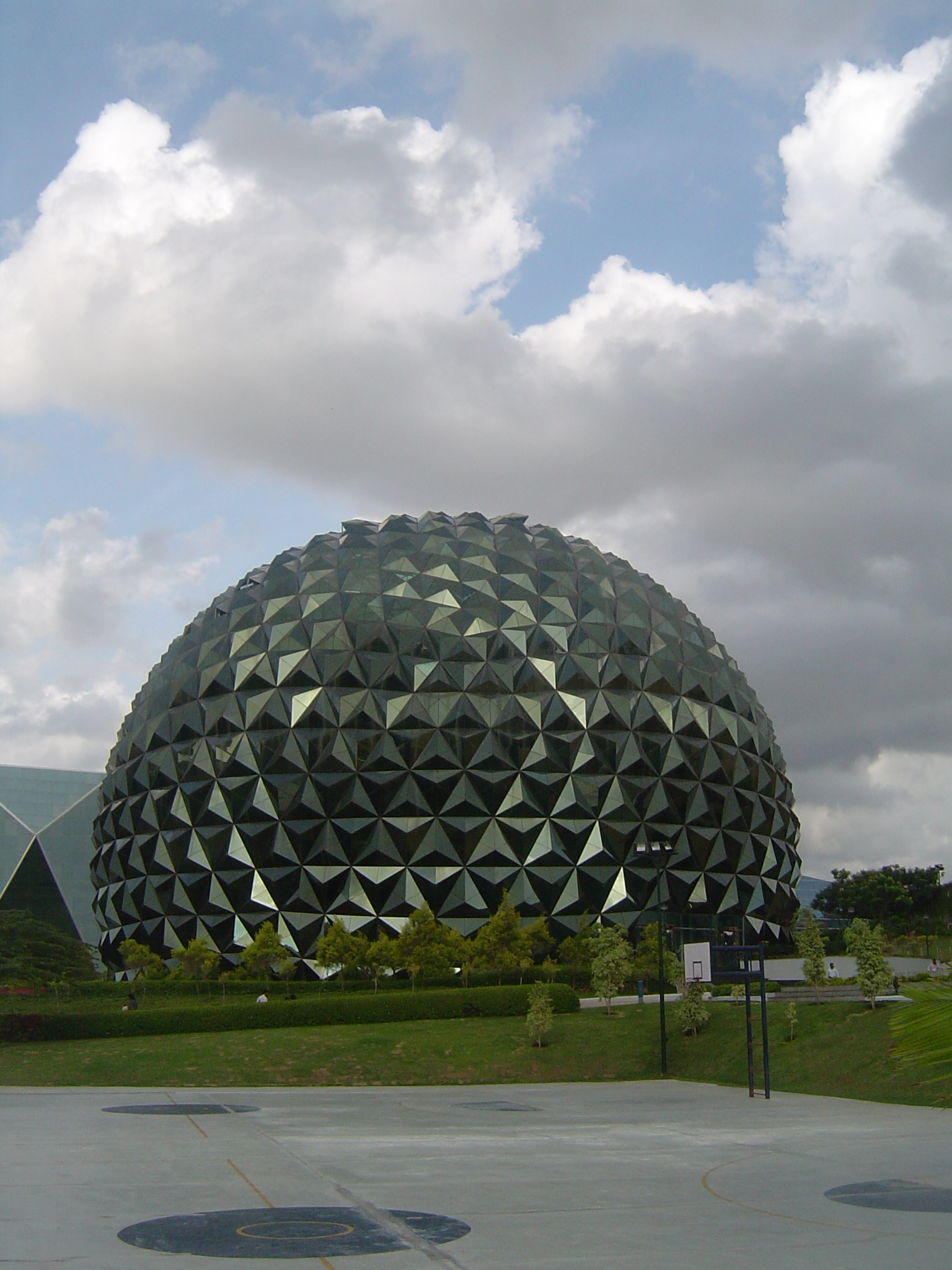

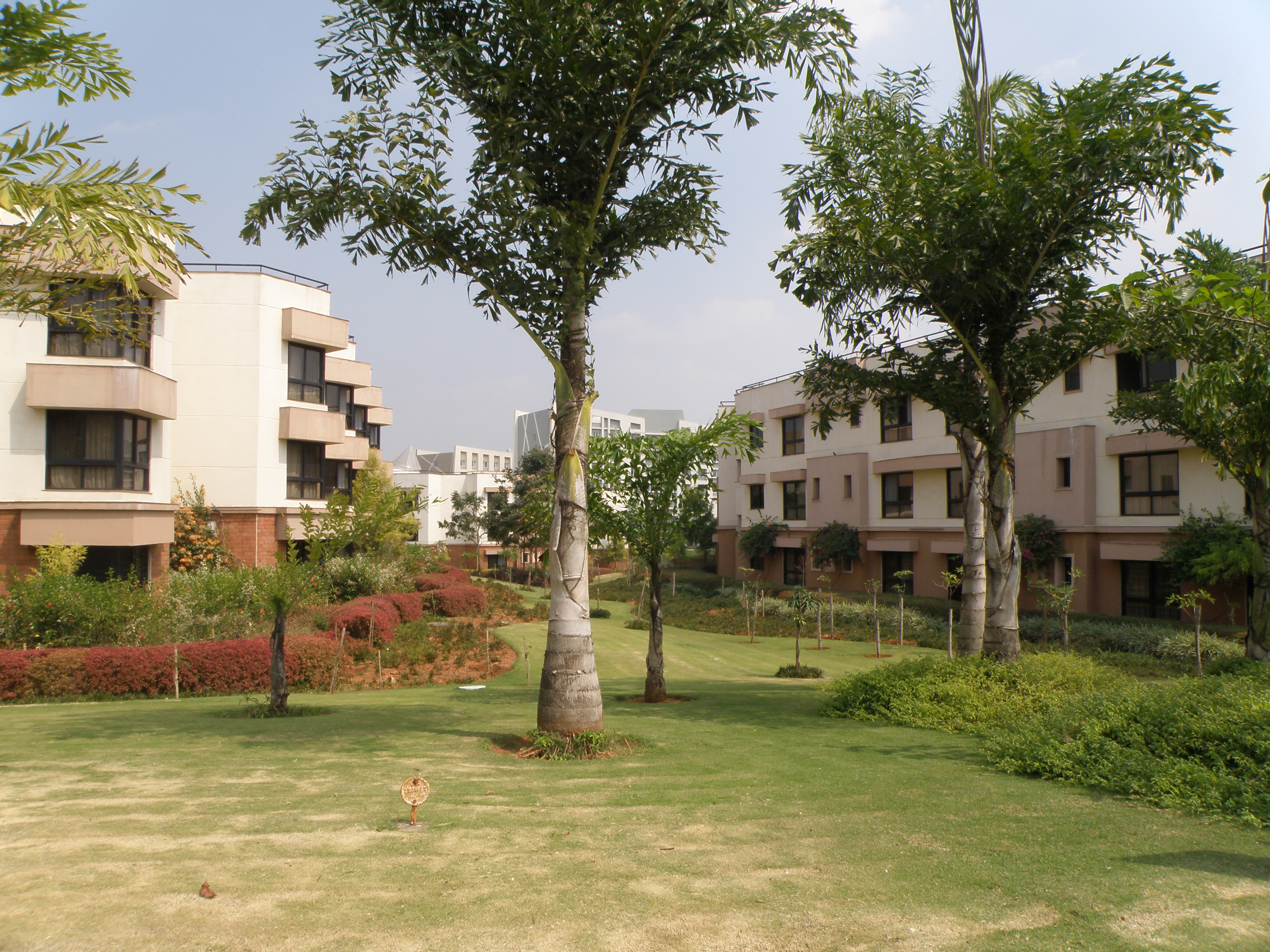

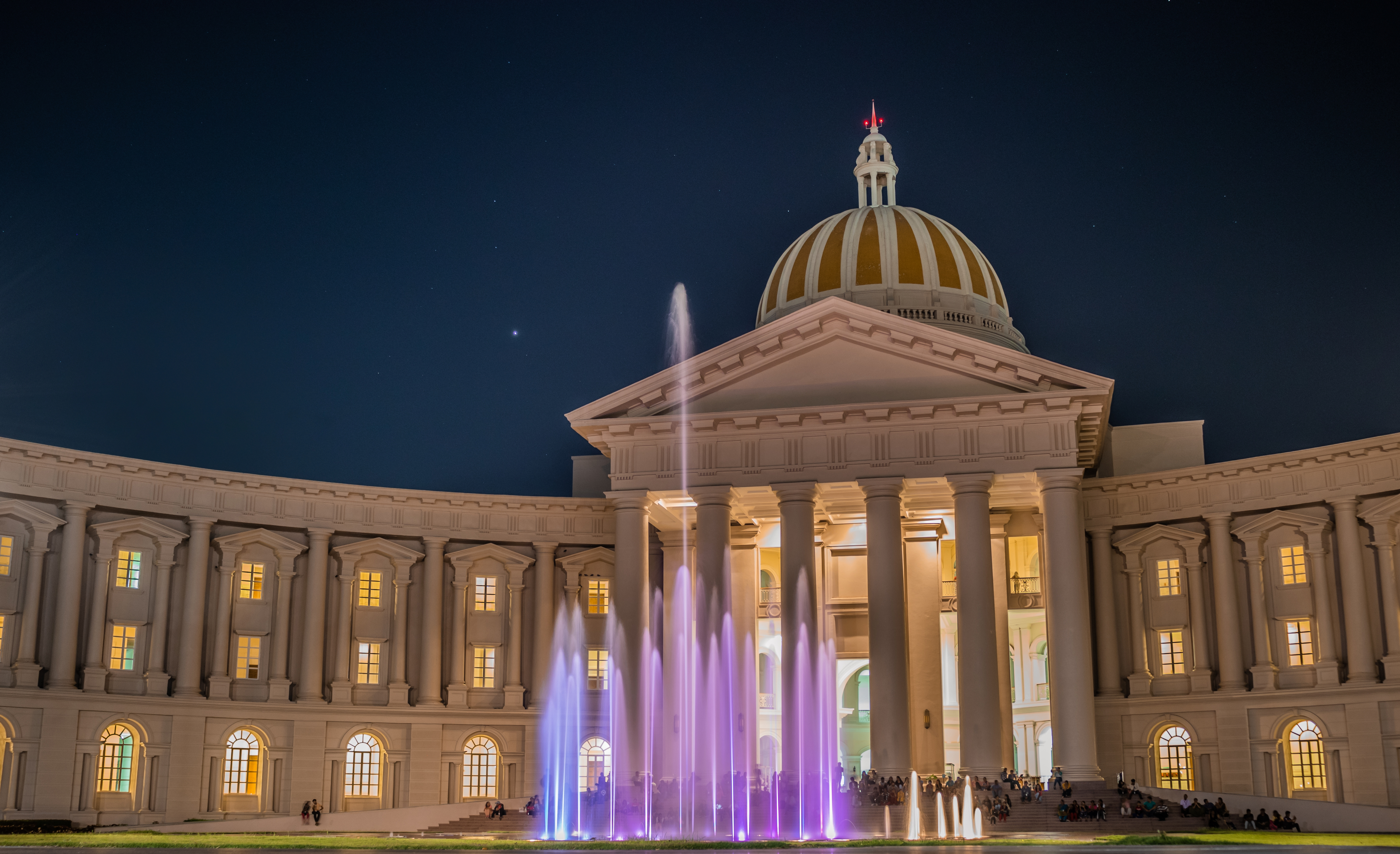

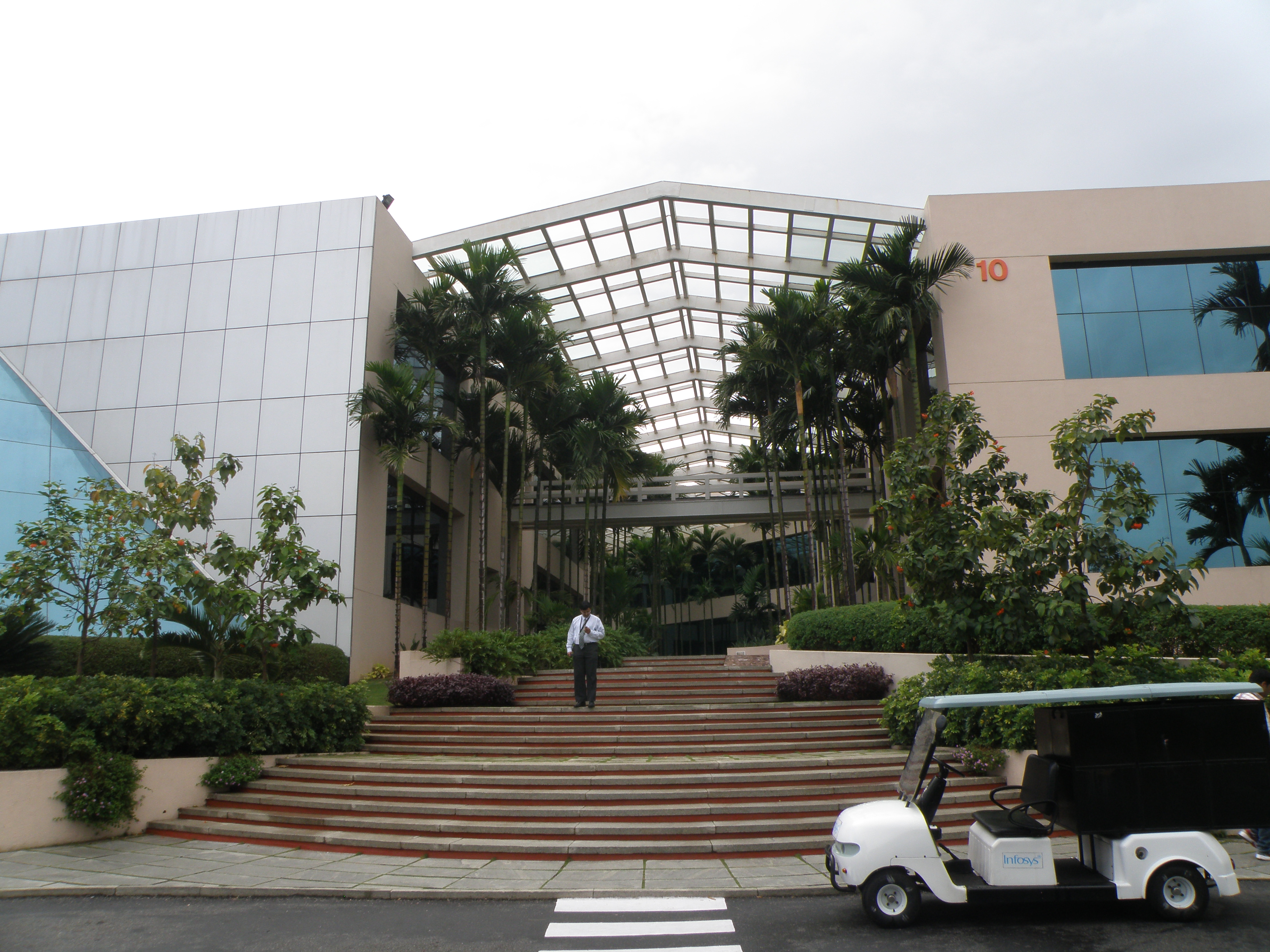

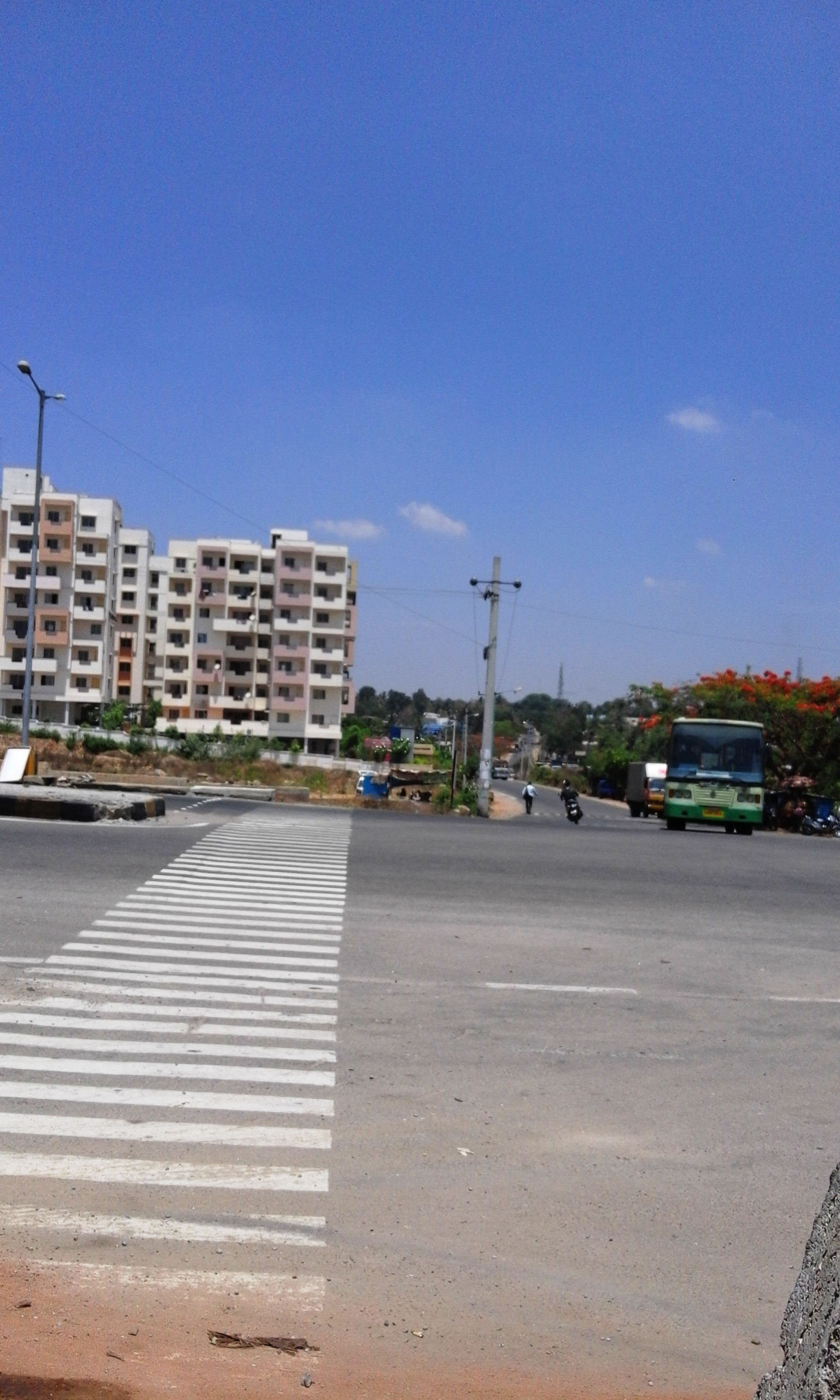

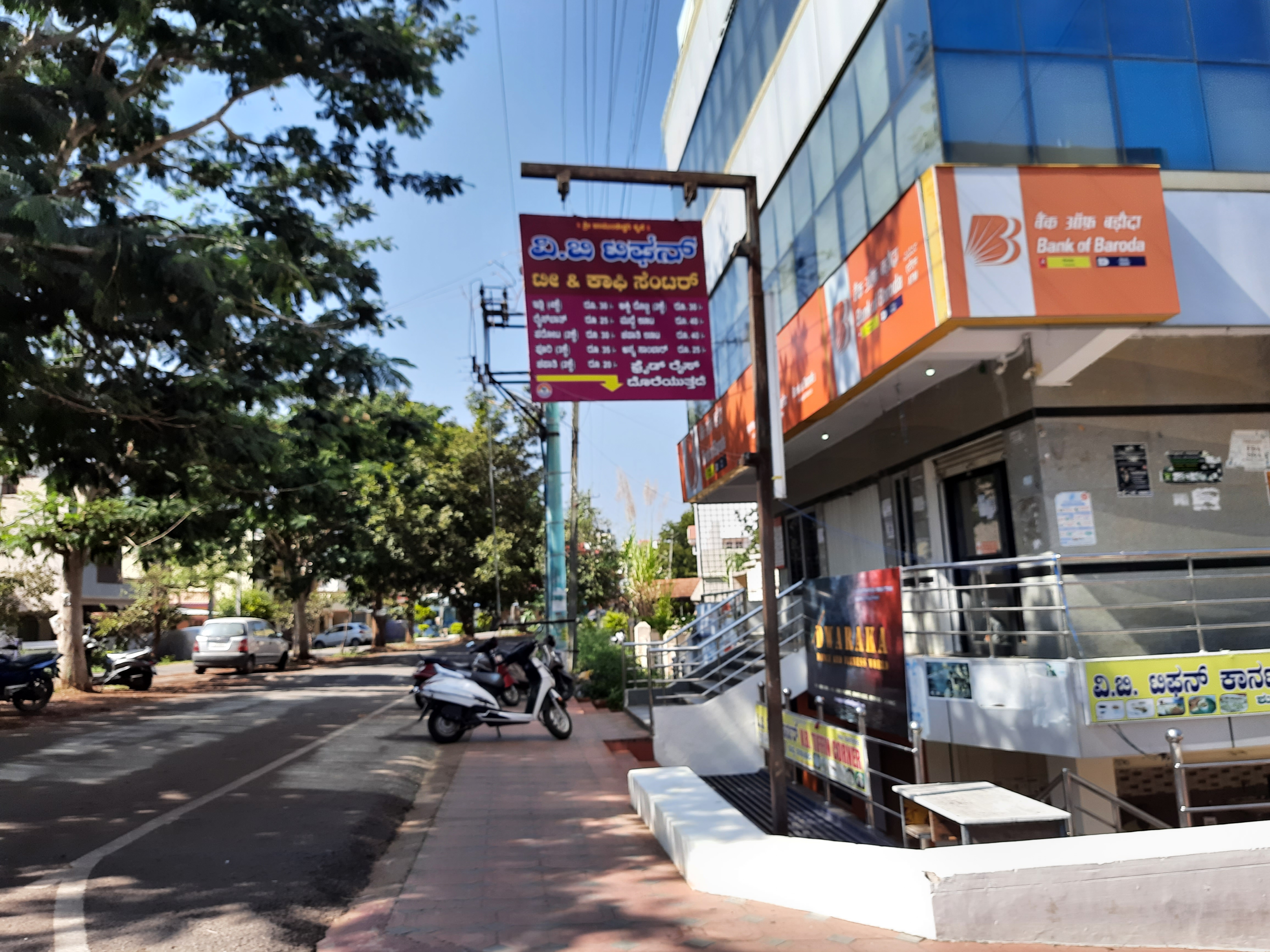

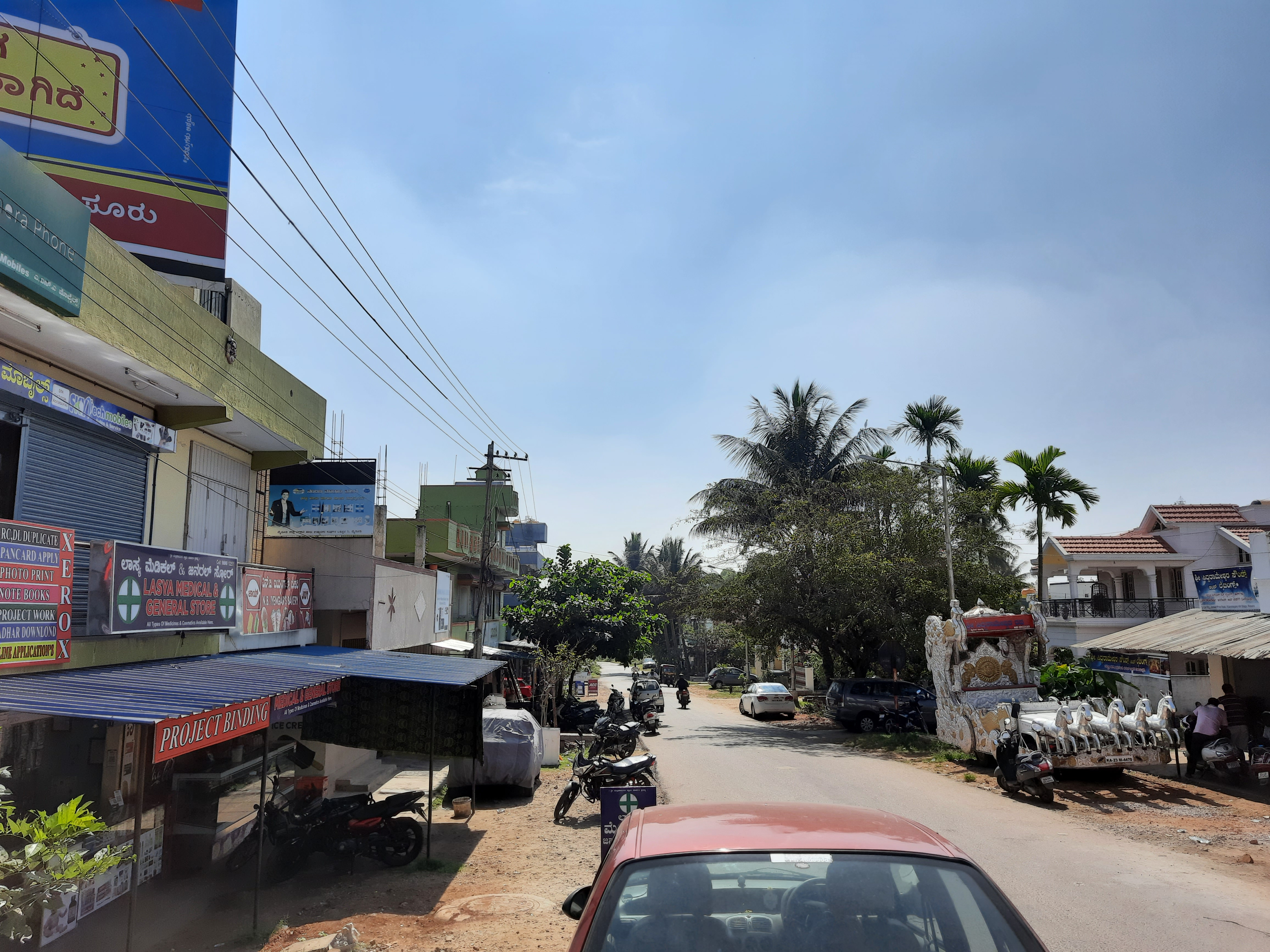

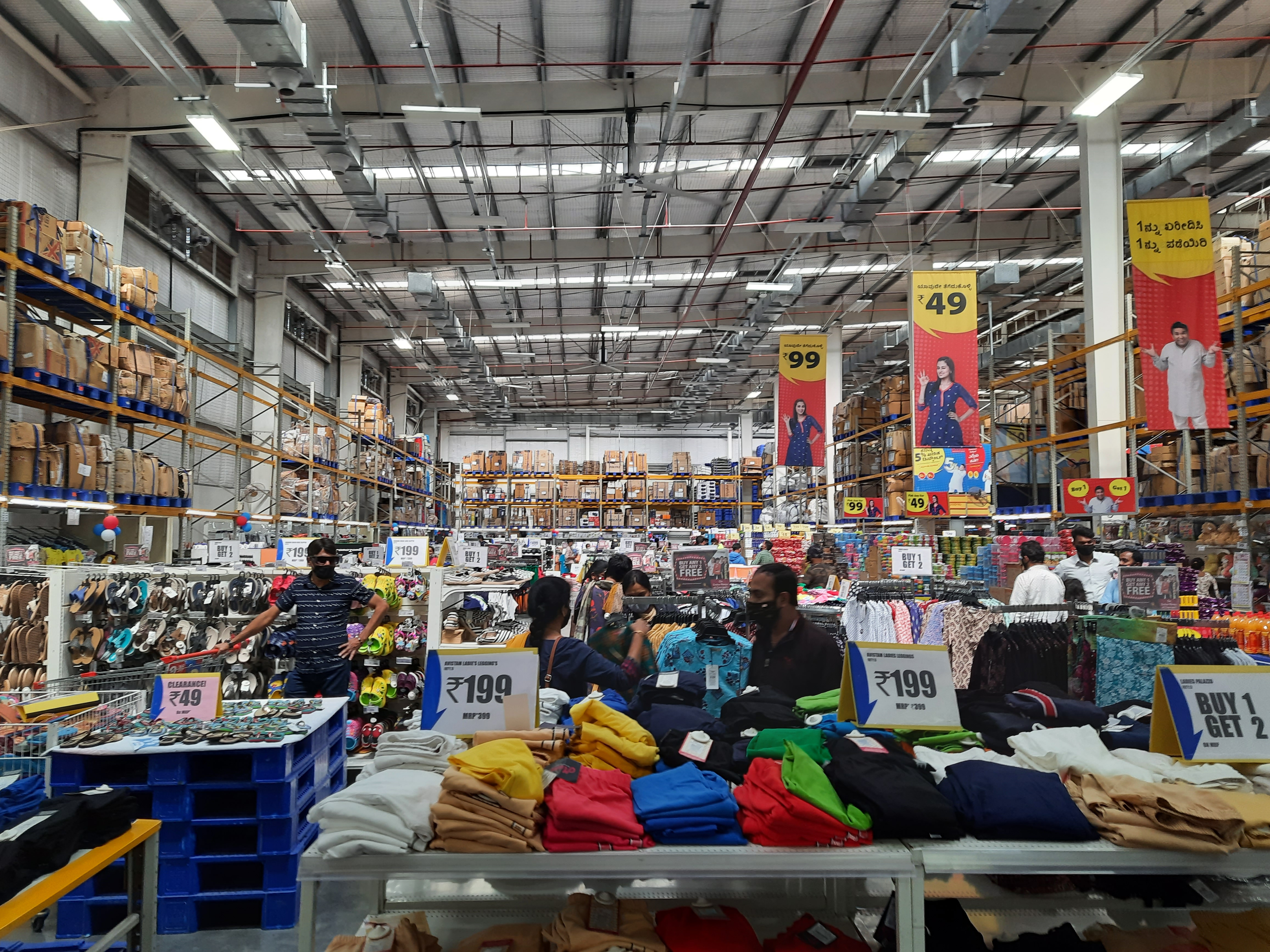
