= Outer Ring Road, Mysore =

Road in Mysore, India

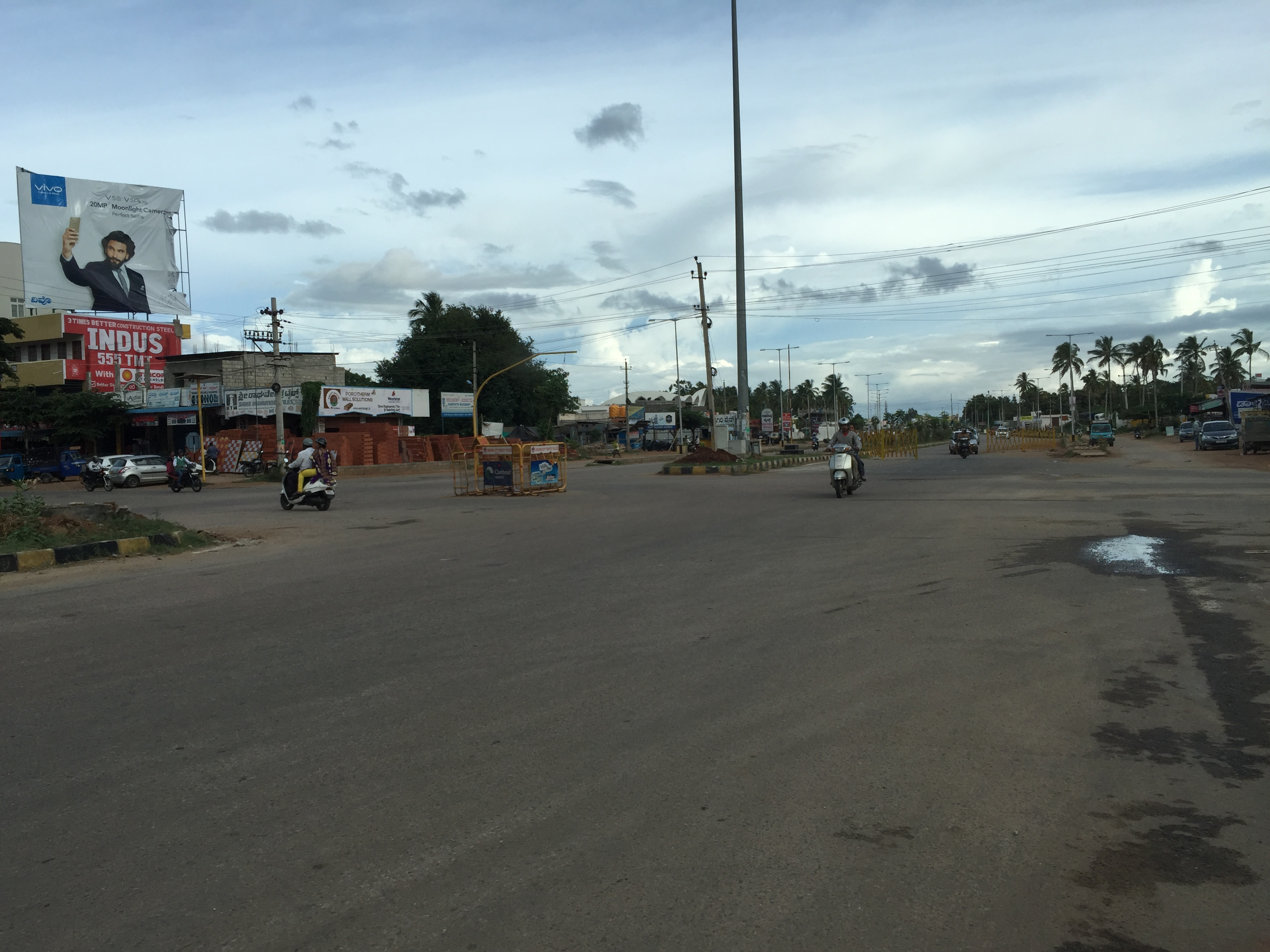

Route information
- Maintained by Mysore Urban Development Authority
- Length: 42.5 km (26.4 mi)

Location
- Country: India
- Major cities: Mysore

Highway system
- Roads in India; Expressways; National; State; Asian

The Outer Ring Road is a 42.5-kilometer (26.4 mi) long Ring road within the South Indian city of Mysore, Karnataka. The road was originally to be widened to eight lanes, but was reduced to six in order to free up funds for building a missing link along the road. Most of the road was opened in 2012. There are four railway bridges over the course of the road.

== See also ==
- Kalaburagi Ring Road
- Bengaluru Outer Ring Road
- State Highway 17 (Karnataka)
