= Akbar (name) =

Akbar, Ackbar, or Akber is a masculine given name and surname of Arabic origin. Notable people with the name include:

== Given name ==
=== Ackbar ===
- Ackbar Abbas (1942–2026), Hong Kong academic
- Ackbar Khan (born 1931), Trinidadian judge

=== Akbar ===
- Akbar (1542–1605), Mughal Emperor
- Akbar II (1760–1837), Mughal emperor
- Akbar Abdi (1960–2026), Iranian actor
- Akbar Adibi (1939–2000), Iranian electronic engineer, VLSI researcher, and professor
- Akbar Agha (born 1943), Pakistani author, educator, and diplomat
- Akbar Aghayev (1919–1944), Soviet-Azerbaijani Army officer
- Akbar Ahadi (born 1975), Iranian boxer and coach
- Akbar Ahmadpour (1958–2025), Iranian politician
- Akbar Ahmed (born 1943), Pakistani-American academic, author, poet, playwright, filmmaker, and diplomat
- Akbar A'lami (born 1954), Iranian politician
- Akbar Alemi (1945–2020), Iranian television presenter and documentary film director
- Akbar Ali (cricketer) (born 2001), Bangladeshi cricketer
- Akbar Ali (poet) (1925–2016), Indian poet
- Akbar Ali (politician) (born 2004), American politician
- Akbar Ali (umpire) (born 1973), Indian cricket umpire
- Akbar Alizad (born 1973), Iranian theater director
- Akbar Allahabadi (1846–1921), Indian poet
- Akbar Ansari (born 1988), Pakistani-British cricketer
- Akbar Arjunsyah (born 2001), Indonesian footballer
- Akbar Askani (born 1982), Pakistani politician
- Akbar Atri, Iranian democracy and human rights activist
- Akbar Babakhanlou (born 1939), Iranian sprinter
- Akbar S. Babar, Pakistani politician
- Akbar Badshah (born 1985), Pakistani cricketer
- Akbar Baig (born 1974), Indian-Ugandan cricketer
- Akbar Al Baker (born 1962), Qatari businessman
- Akbar Behkalam (1944–2025), Iranian-German painter and sculptor
- Akbar Bugti (1927–2006), Pakistani politician
- Akbar Bintang Cahyono (born 1996), Indonesian badminton player
- Akbar Djuraev (born 1999), Uzbekistani weightlifter
- Akbar Ahmad Dumpy (born 1948), Indian politician
- Akbar Ebrahim (born 1963), Indian racing driver
- Akbar Eftekhari (1943–2017), Iranian footballer
- Akbar Etemad (1930–2025), Iranian engineer
- Akbar Fallah (born 1966), Iranian wrestler
- Akbar Firmansyah (born 2002), Indonesian footballer
- Akbar Ganji (born 1960), Iranian journalist, writer, and soldier
- Akbar Gbaja-Biamila (born 1979), American football player and television host
- Akbar Golpayegani (1934–2023), Iranian traditional singer
- Akbar Hermawan (born 1998), Indonesian footballer
- Akbar Hossain (journalist), Bangladeshi journalist and diplomat
- Akbar Hossain (novelist) (1917–1981), Bangladeshi novelist
- Akbar Hossain (politician) (1941–2006), Bangladeshi politician
- Akbar Khan Hoti (born 1956), Pakistani police officer
- Akbar Husain, Indian politician
- Akbar Hydari (1869–1941), Indian politician
- Akbar Imani (born 1992), Iranian footballer
- Akbar Ismatullaev (born 1991), Uzbekistani footballer
- Akbar Jiskani (1958–1999), Pakistani writer
- Akbar Kabir (1915–2002), Bangladeshi social worker
- Akbar Kakkattil (1954–2016), Indian short story writer and novelist
- Akbar Kalili (1956–2018), Iranian alpine skier
- Akbar Kargarjam (1944–2025), Iranian footballer
- Akbar Mirza Khaleeli (born 1936), Indian diplomat
- Akbar Khan (director) (born 1949), Indian actor, screenwriter, producer, and director
- Akbar Khan (disability activist) (born 1962), Indian musician and activist
- Akbar Ali Khan (economist) (1944–2022), Bangladeshi economist and educationist
- Akbar Khan (general, born 1912) (1912–1993), Indian Army Major General
- Akbar Ali Khan (politician) (1899–1994), Indian politician
- Akbar Ayub Khan (born 1971), Pakistani politician
- Akbar Khamiso Khan (born 1976), Pakistani musician
- Akbar Khazaei (born 1980), Iranian bodybuilding judge
- Akbar Khojini (1935–1995), Iranian boxer
- Akbar Ali Khondkar (1957–2005), Indian politician
- Akbar Khurasani (born 1961), Afghan-Ukrainian painter
- Akbar Kurtha (born 1970), British actor
- Akbar Makhmoor (1956–2017), Pakistani poet and lexicographer
- Akbar Masood, Indian academic administrator
- Akbar Mass'oud (1885–1975), Iranian prince
- Akbar Mirzoyev (born 1939), Tajikistani politician
- Akbar Misaghian (born 1953), Iranian footballer and coach
- Akbar Mohammadi (footballer) (born 1975), Iranian footballer
- Akbar Mohammadi (student) (1969–2006), Iranian student
- Akbar Motalebizadeh (1963–2025), Iranian nuclear scientist
- Akbar Muhammad (1939–2016), American historian
- Akbar Muradov (born 1968), Azerbaijani Paralympic sport shooter
- Akbar Musazai (born 1996), Afghan cricketer
- Akbar Shah Khan Najibabadi (1875–1938), Indian historian
- Akbar Nawas (born 1975), Singaporean football coach
- Akbar Nikzad (born 1969), Iranian politician
- Akbar Padamsee (1928–2020), Indian artist and painter
- Akbar Patel, Mauritian football coach
- Akbar Poudeh (1932–2012), Iranian cyclist
- Akbar Pray (born 1948), American writer, columnist, and drug kingpin
- Akbar Radi (1939–2007), Iranian playwright
- Akbar Hashemi Rafsanjani (1934–2017), Iranian politician
- Akbar Ranjbarzadeh (born 1965), Iranian politician
- Akbar Rasyid (born 1983), Indonesian footballer
- Akbar-ur-Rehman (born 1983), Pakistani cricketer
- Akbar Riansyah (born 1993), Indonesian footballer
- Akbar Sadeghi (born 1985), Iranian footballer
- Akbar Saghiri (born 1982), Iranian footballer
- Akbar Saheb (born 1963), Indian-Emirati contemporary artist, painter, and sculptor
- Akbar Salubiro (1995–2017), Indonesian man eaten by a python
- Akbar Sami, Indian dance choreographer, DJ, and musician
- Akbar Schandermani (1917–1995), Iranian politician
- Akbar Shah (footballer) (born 1996), Singaporean footballer
- Akbar agha Sheykhulislamov (1891–1961), Azerbaijani public figure and politician
- Akbar Subhani (born 1970), Pakistani actor
- Akbar Tabari (born 1961), Iranian politician
- Akbar Tandjung (born 1945), Indonesian politician
- Akbar Tanjung (footballer) (born 1993), Indonesian footballer
- Akbar Tashkulov (born 1971), Uzbek jurist
- Akbar Torkan (1952–2021), Iranian mechanical engineer and politician
- Akbar Torki, Iranian physician and politician
- Akbar Turaev (born 1989), Uzbek football goalkeeper
- Akbar Yerevanly (1921–1982), Azerbaijani writer, literary scholar, pedagogue, and assistant professor
- Akbar Khan Zand (died 1782), Iranian prince

=== Akber ===
- Akber Ali Wahidi (1957–2011), Pakistani sports statistician, writer, journalist, historian, and media manager

== Surname ==
- Amna Akbar, American academic
- Eshaan Akbar (born 1984) English comedian, writer, and actor
- Harris Akbar (born 1998), English boxer
- Rada Akbar (born 1988), Afghan visual artist and photographer
- Showat Akbar, one of the ringleaders of the murder of Richard Everitt
- Skandor Akbar (1934–2010), ring name of American professional wrestler and manager Jimmy Wehba
- Wahab Akbar (1960–2007), Filipino politician

== Fictional characters ==
- One of the comic-strip duo Akbar and Jeff of Life in Hell
- Admiral Ackbar, Star Wars character

== See also ==
- Akbar (disambiguation)
