= Dattagalli =

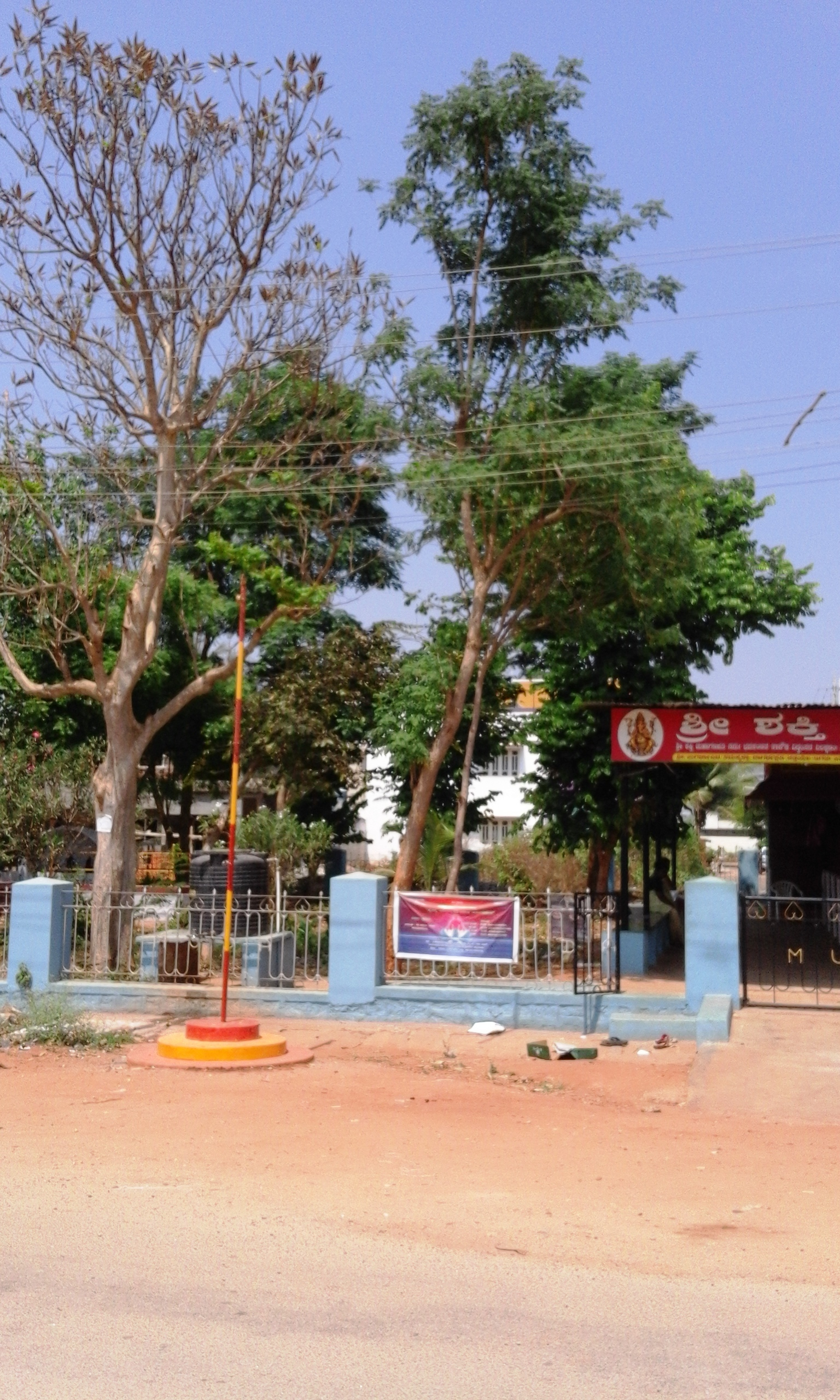
- Temple at Dattagalli bus terminus, Mysore
- Interactive map of Dattagalli
- Coordinates: 12.28512°N 76.60187°E
- Country: India
- State: Karnataka

Dattagalli is a residential area on the southwest of the city of Mysore, the second largest city in the state of Karnataka, India.

== Location ==
Dattagalli is situated around the outer ring road and it is near to Ramakrishnanagar circle, Kuvempu Nagar and Andolana Circle. Dattagalli is part of the Mysore Urban Development Authority planning area. Mysore Airport is 10 km away from Dattagalli. Some famous landmarks here are SaRa Convention Hall, More Supermarket and Nalapak Restaurant. There is a small lake in Dattagalli 3rd Stage.

== Education ==
There are three prominent schools in this area, the Kautilya Vidyalaya (12.274306°N 76.610927°E), Christ Public School and the Supreme Public School (12.278325°N 76.609447°E). One Ayurvedic Hospital (12.297596°N 6.6542°E) is also situated in Dattagalli.

== See also ==
- Bogadi
- Ramakrishna Nagar
- Kuvempu Nagar

== Image Gallery ==
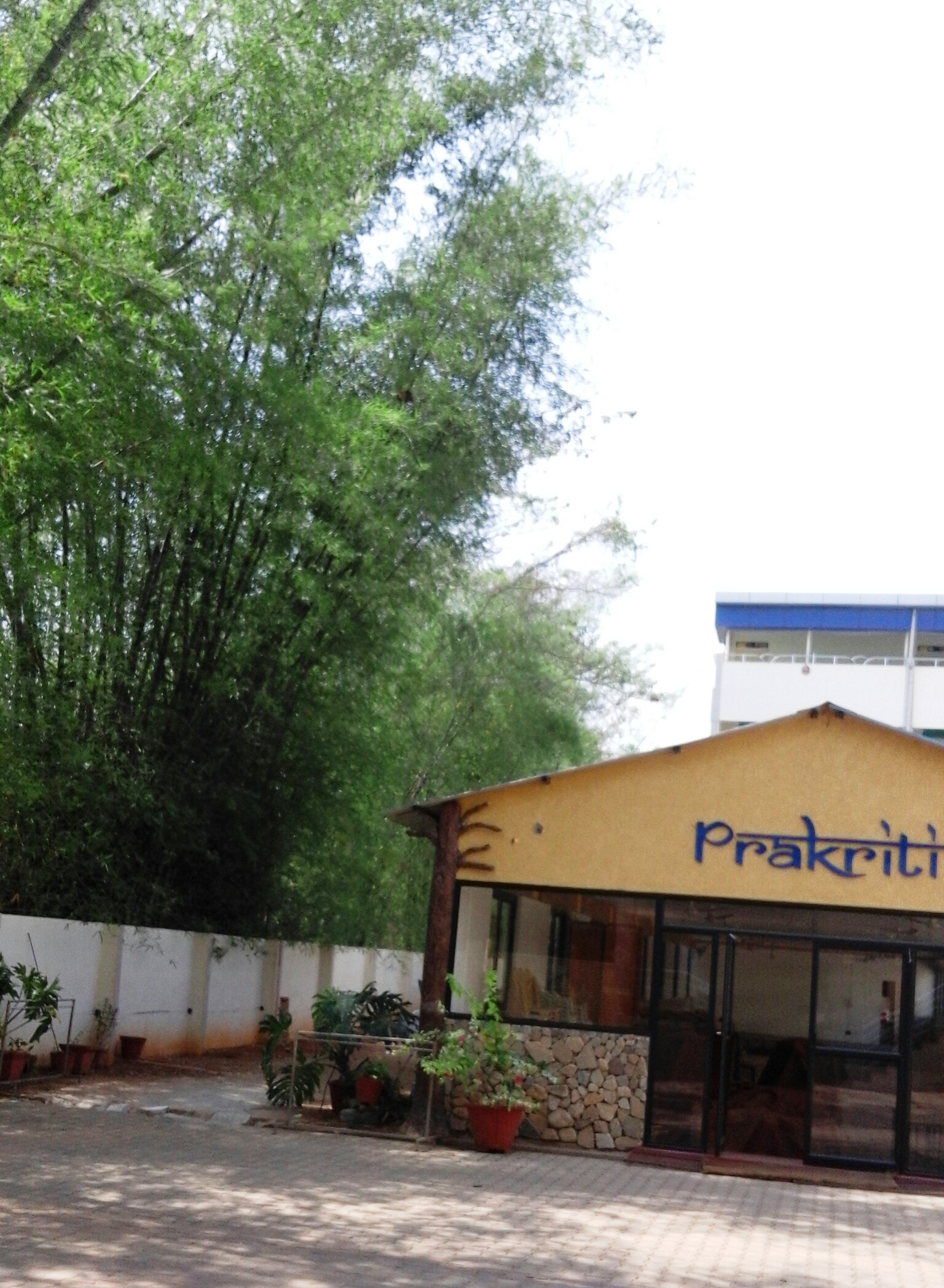
Kautilya school

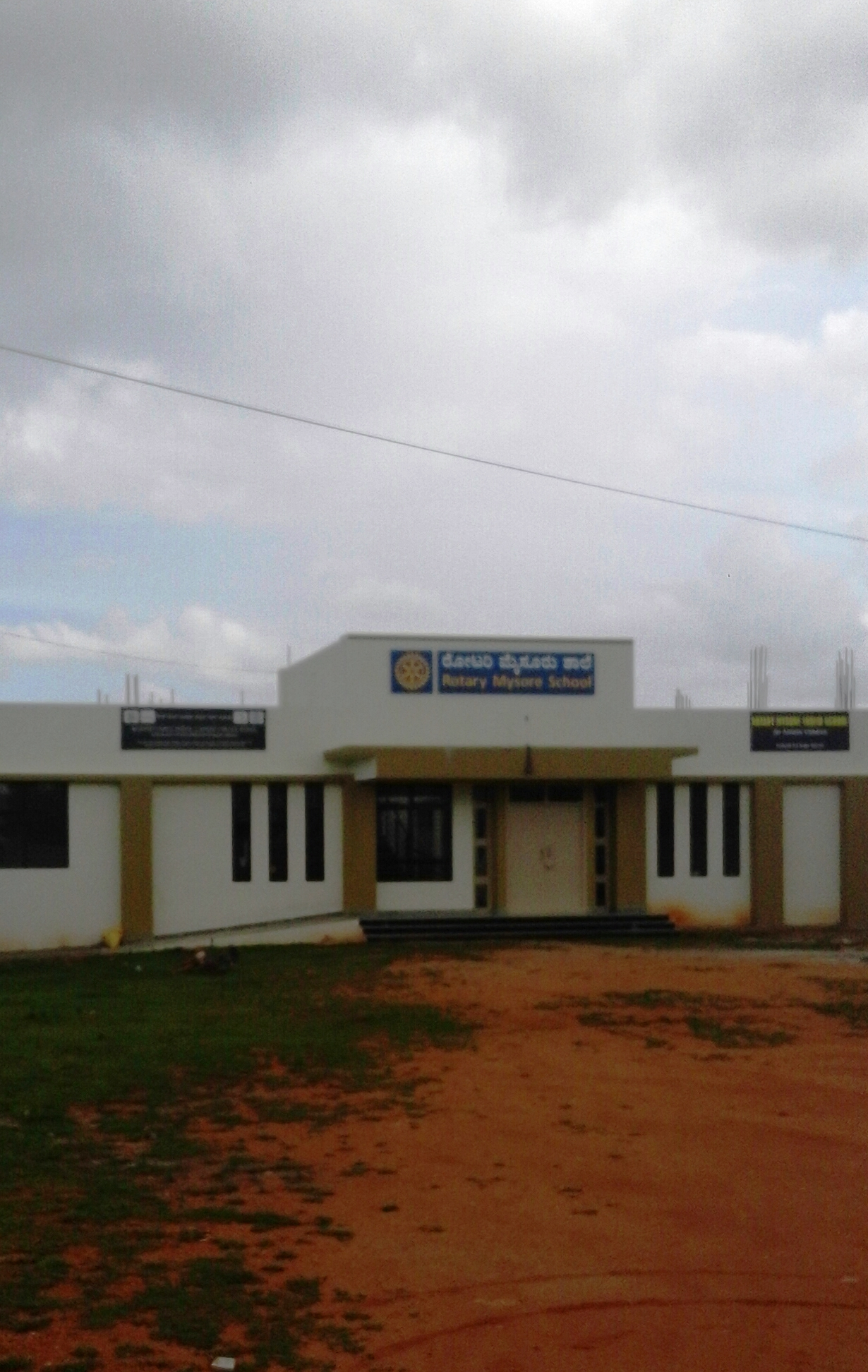
Rotary School

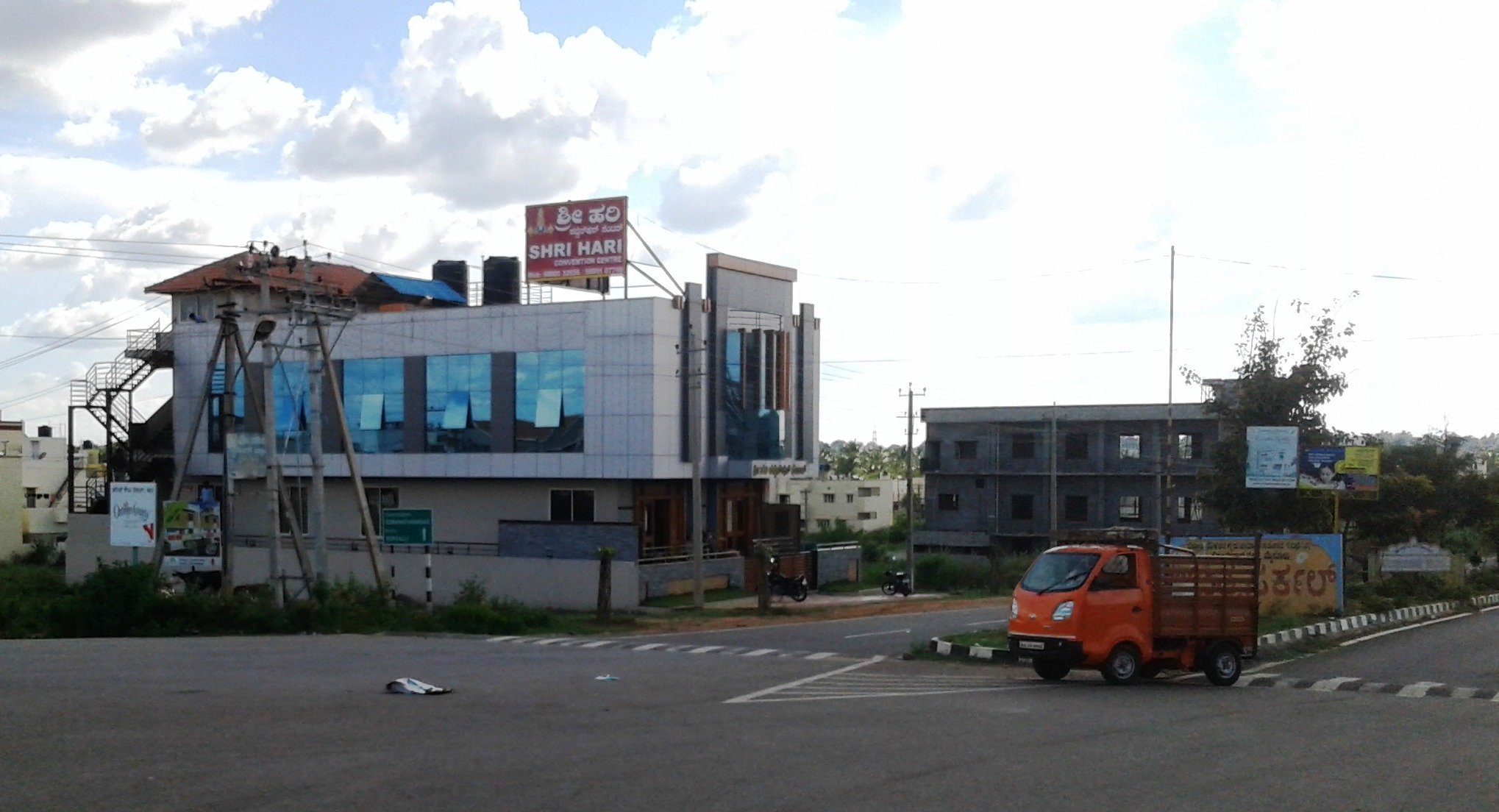
Somanath Road

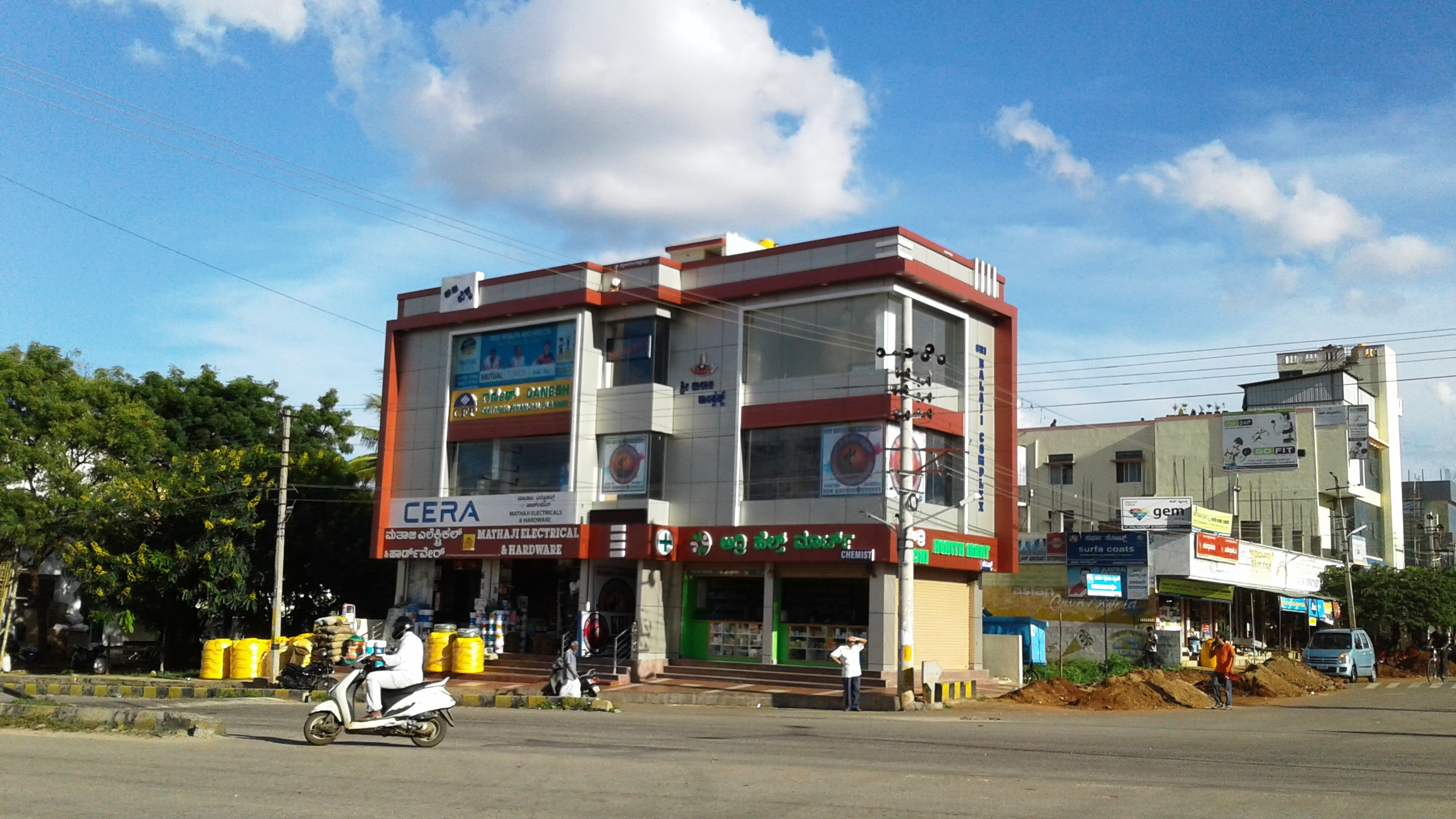
Nethaji Circle
