= Vivekanandanagar =

Vivekananda Nagar
- Interactive map of Vivekananda Nagar
- Coordinates: 12.27707°N 76.62582°E
- Country: India
- State: Karnataka

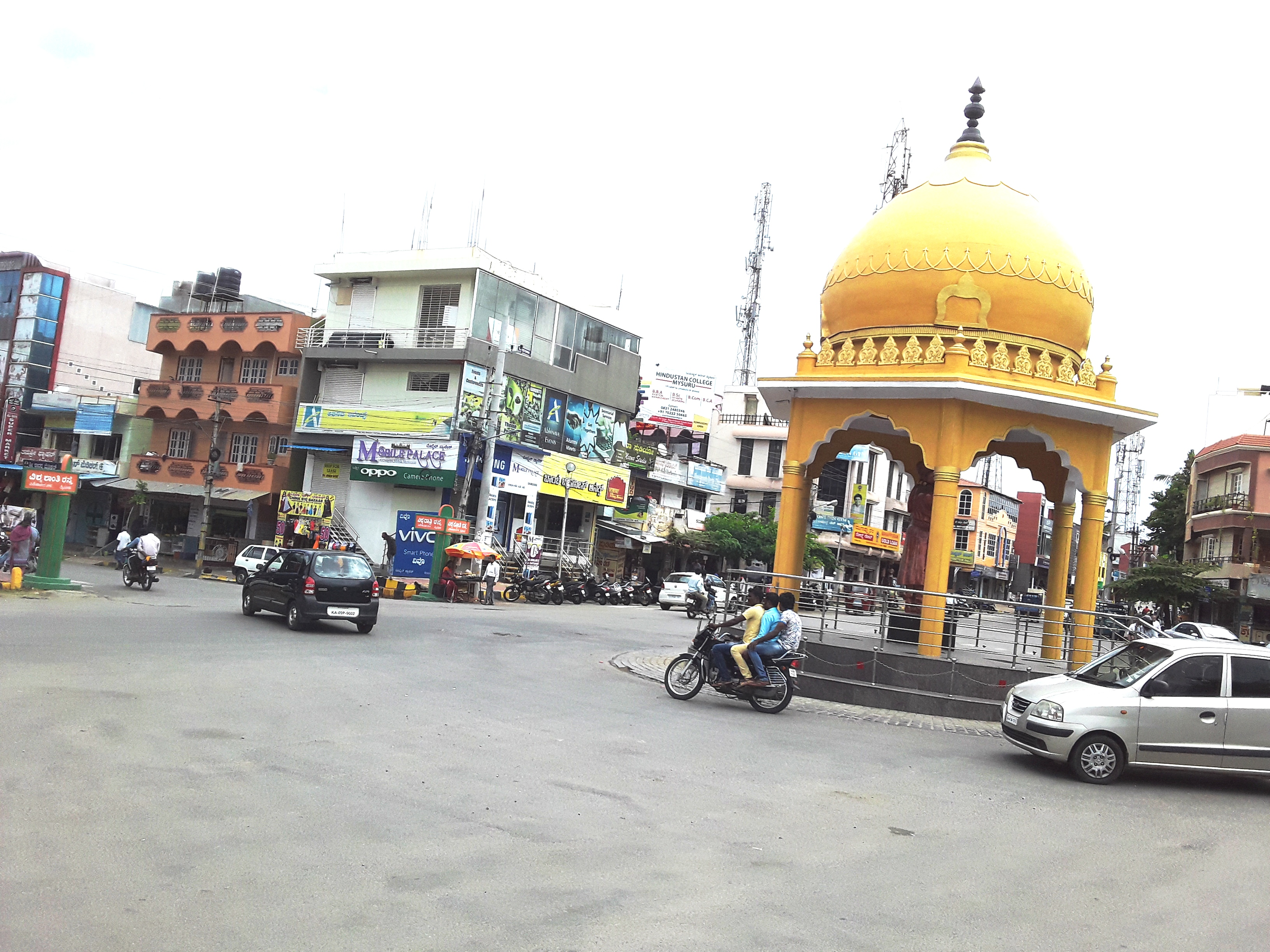
Vivekananda Circle, Mysore

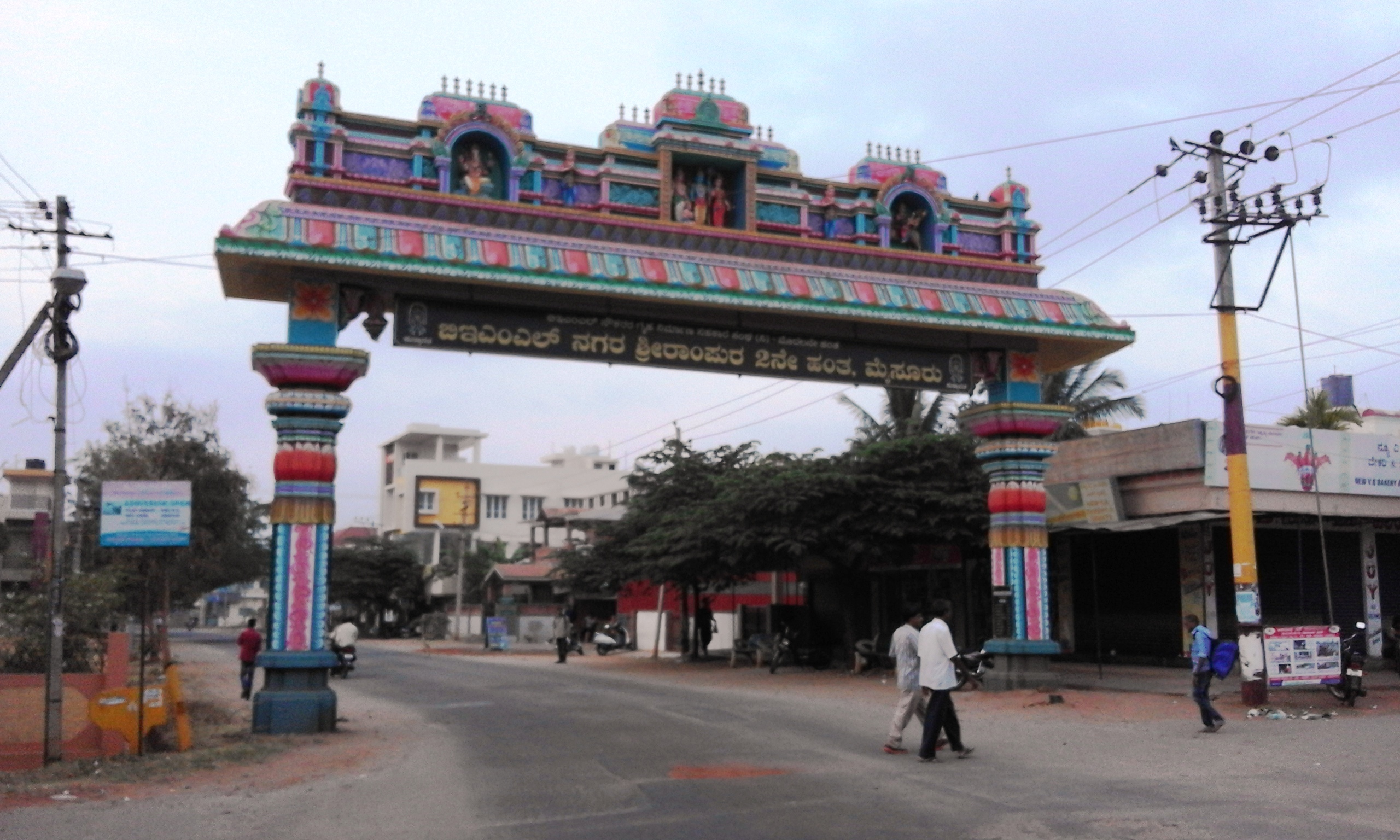
BEML Second Stage

Vivekananda Nagar is a suburb of Mysore City in Karnataka state, India.

== Economy ==
Vivekananda Nagar is a densely populated area with many shops and commercial centres. There is a big bus station called Kuvempunagar bus depot near the Vivekananda Circle. Prominent residential colonies like the L.I.C. Colony and the S.B.M. Colony are also near the Vivekananda Circle.

== Community Life ==
This town becomes bustling in the evenings with large numbers of vendors.

== Tourist attractions ==
The scenic Lingam Budhi lake is near this place.

== Residential Layouts ==
The adjacent residential locations are Rama Krishna nagar, Kuvempu Nagar, B.E.M.L. Nagar, Sri Ram Pura and R.M.P.Colony.

== See also ==
- Ramakrishna Nagar
- Kuvempu Nagar
- Srirampur
- Lingam Budhi Lake
- Lingam Budhi Park
