= Lingambudhi Park =

Park in Mysore, India

- Location within Karnataka
- Location: Mysore, India
- Coordinates: 12°16′9.74″N 76°36′43.12″E
- Type: perennial freshwater lake
- Primary inflows: Kaveri River
- Basin countries: India

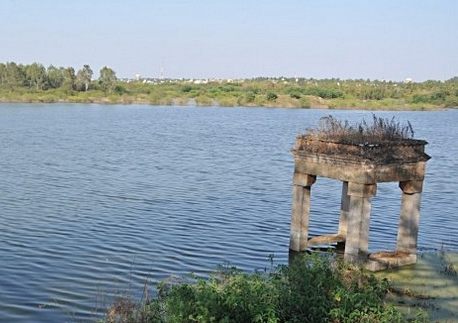
Lingambudhi Lake

Lingambudhi Park is a park in the Indian city of Mysore.

== Location ==
Lingambudhi Park is located on the northern and eastern sides of the Lingambudhi Lake. The north gate of the park is located at Ramakrishna Nagar and the southern gate is located at Preethy Layout, Srirampur.

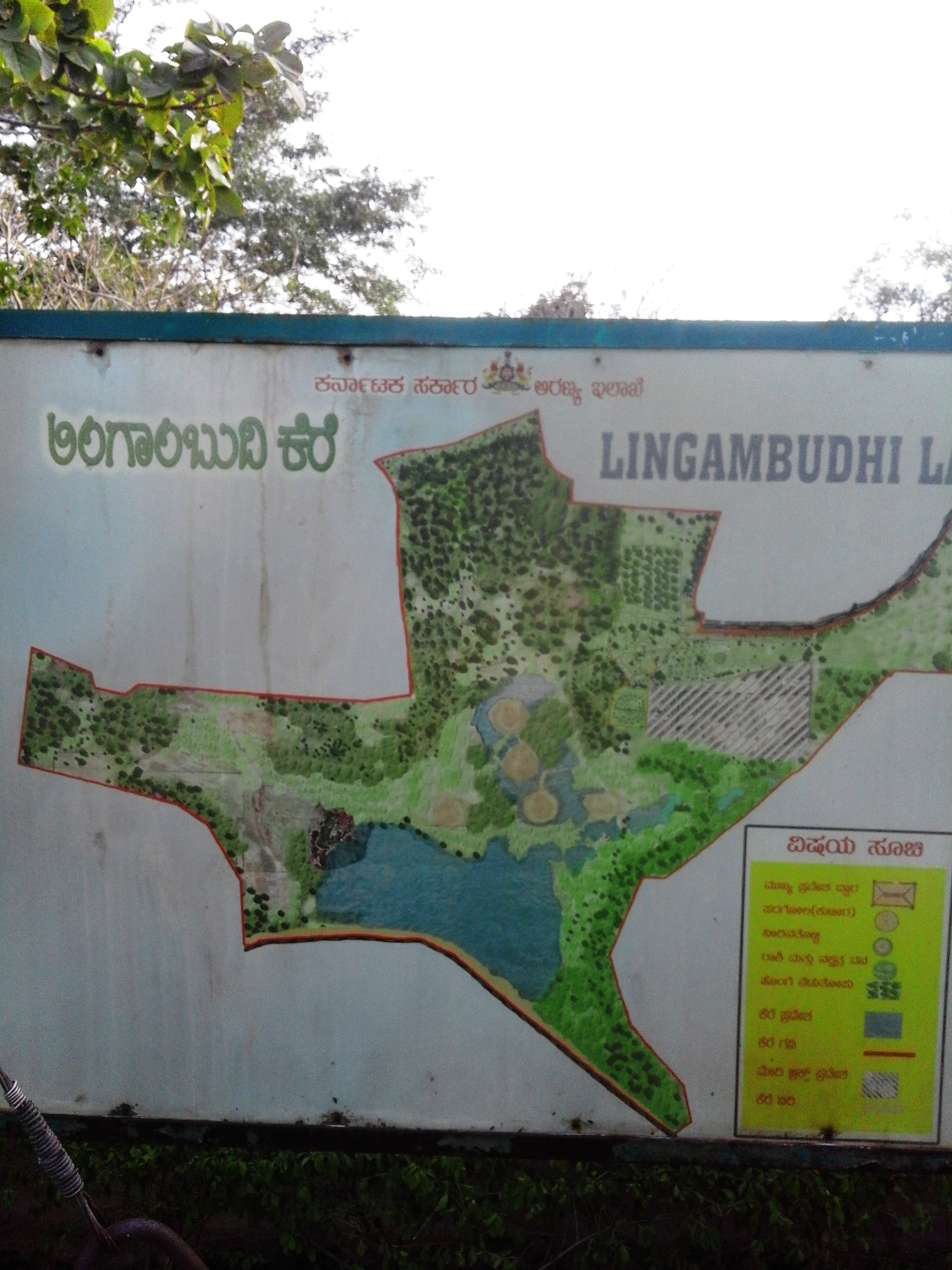
Lingam Budhi Park

== History ==
Lingambudhi stands first in terms of richness entirely due to its location bordering growing city.

Lingambudhi lake is a perennial freshwater lake situated in the basin of River Cauvery. Since its construction in 1828 until the late 1980s, Lingambudhi lake was a typical village lake in the rural surroundings of the city of Mysore.

Now, this lake is close to a residential area called Srirampura. The lake was serving as a source of drinking water, irrigation, and fish produce; as a site for washing clothes and cattle; and as a place of religious worship for the people of Lingambudhi Palya, a village in the vicinity of the lake.

A notification from the DCs office dated 28 August 2003, in response to the Forest Department’s proposal of 2001, had finally declared the Lingambudhi lake and its environs as a protected forest area and had transferred the ownership to the Forest Department. This was one of the significant milestones in the history of Lingambudhi lake which now enjoys the status of a protected forest. (Manjunath Sadashiva, 2007)

== Image gallery ==
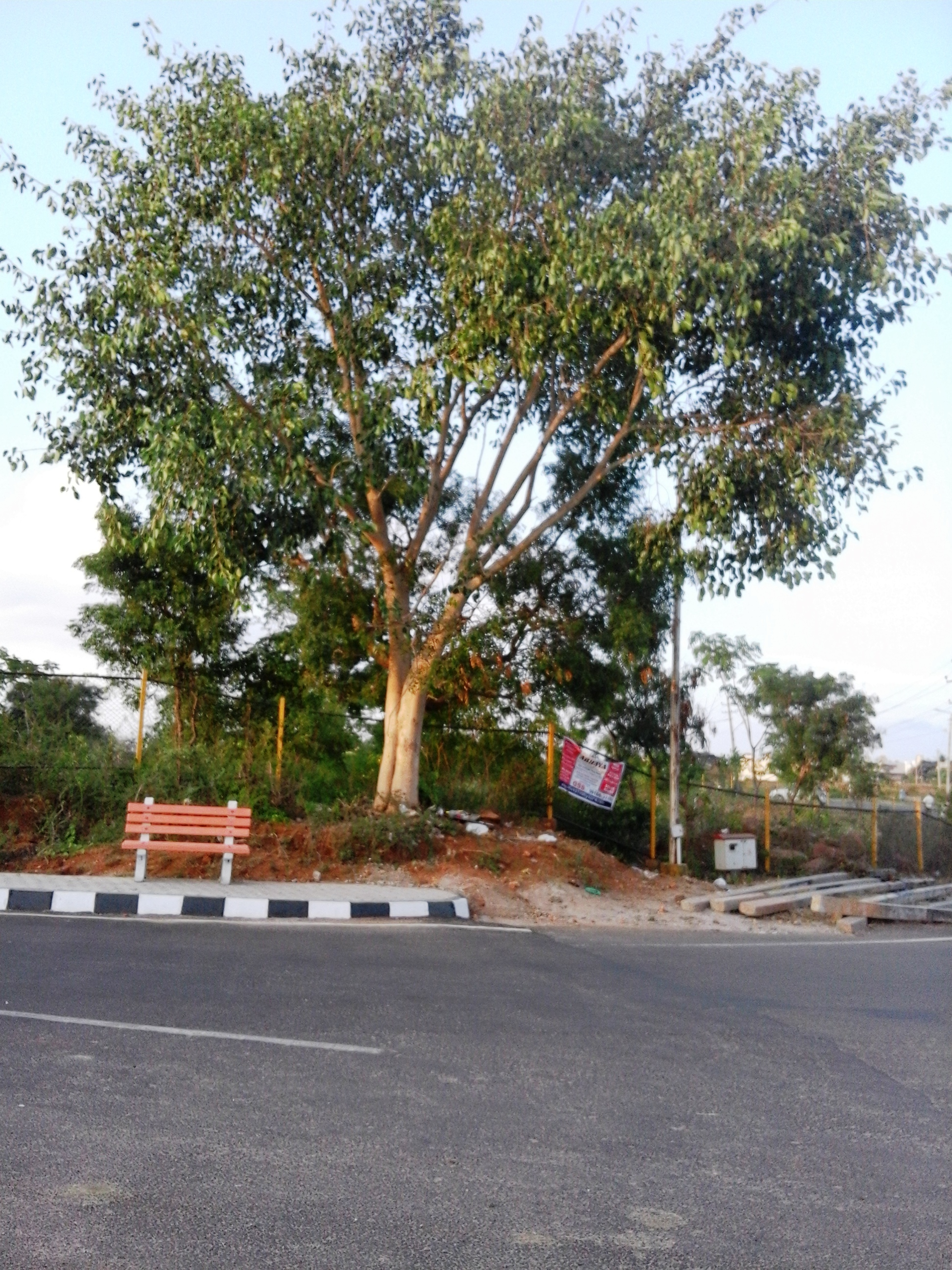
Back view

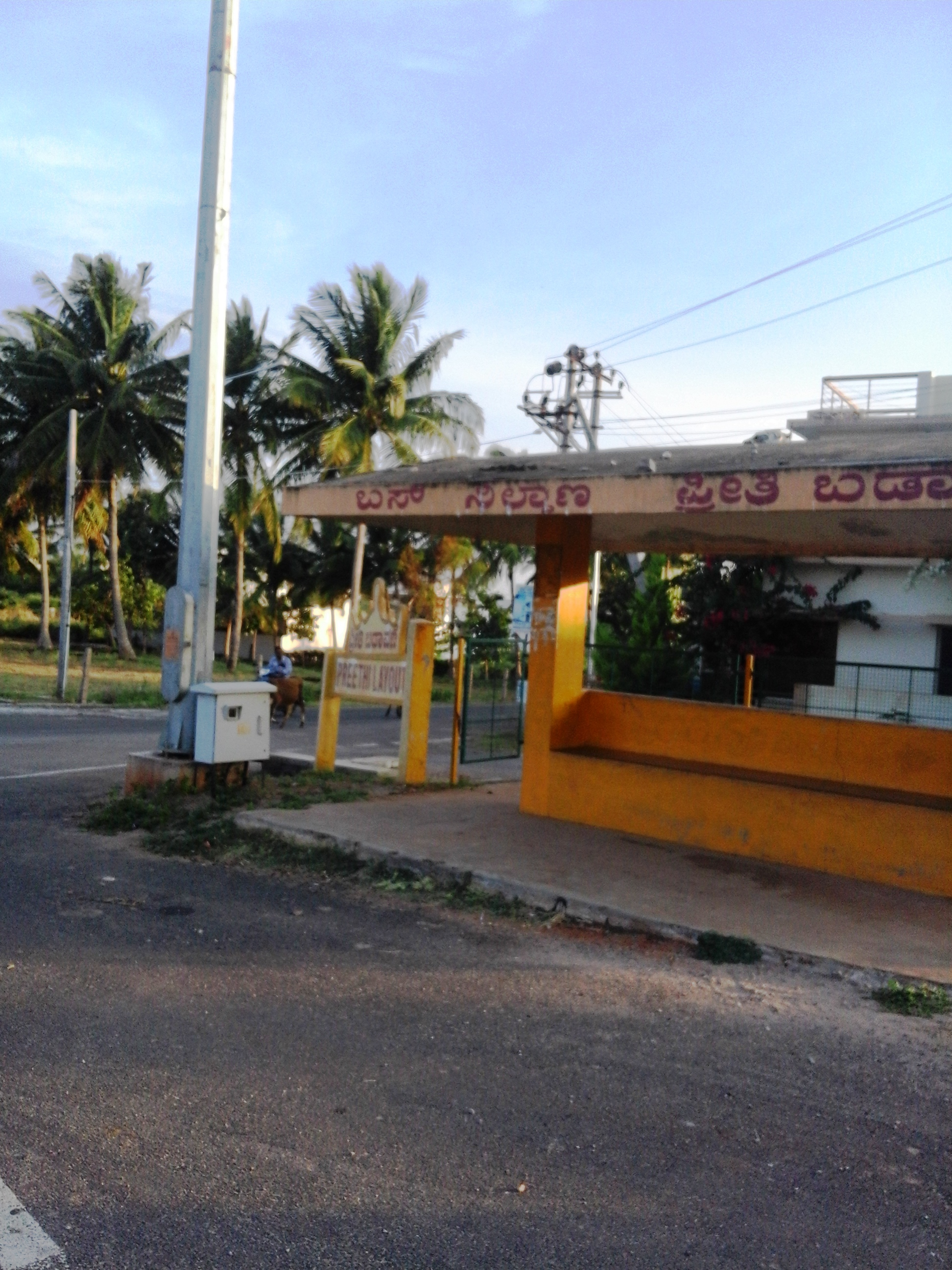
Back of the park

== See also ==
- Ramakrishna Nagar
- Kuvempu Nagar
- Srirampur
- Lingam Budhi Lake
