= Srirampura =

- Town
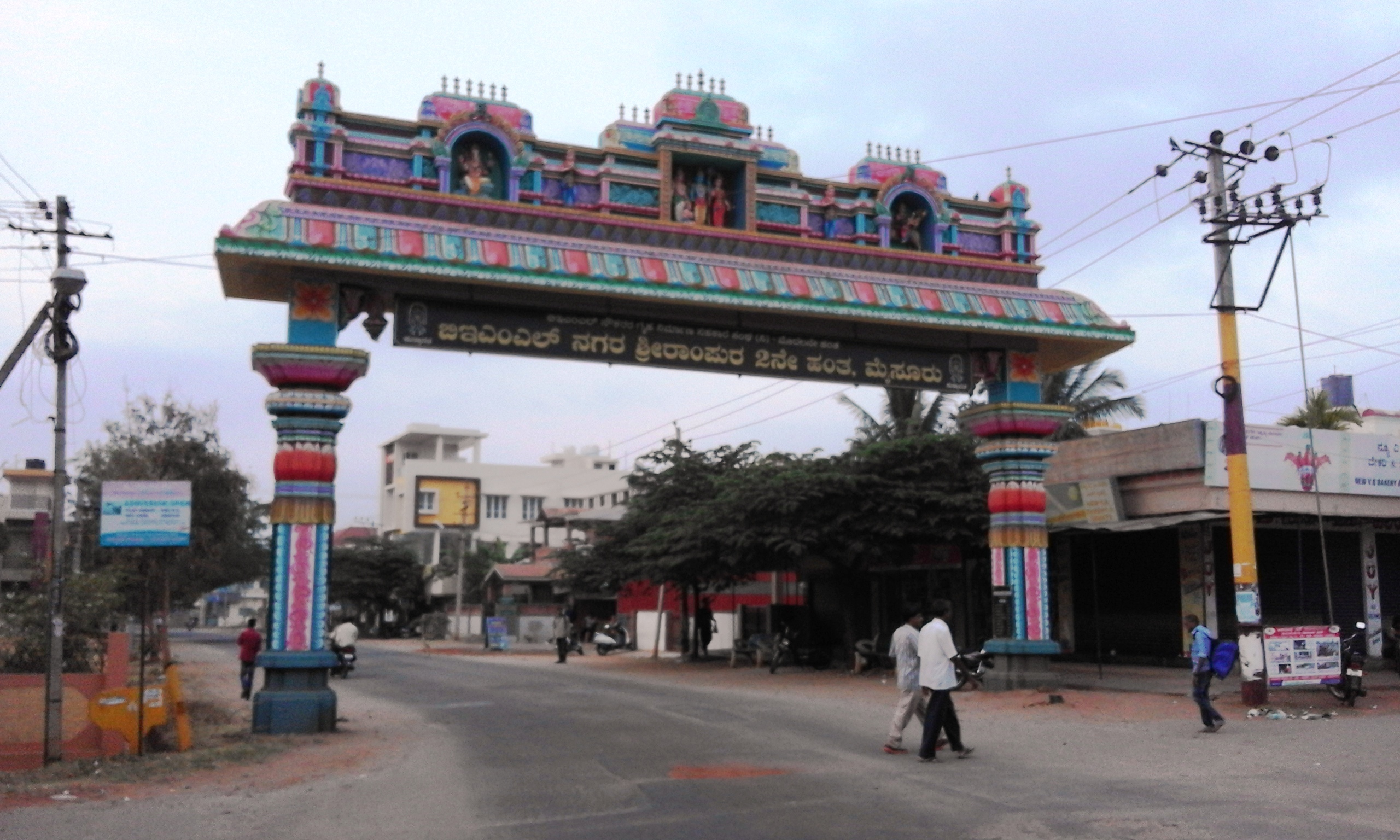
- BEML Nagar, Srirampura
- Interactive map of Srirampura
- Coordinates: 12°11′32″N 76°39′55″E
- Country: India
- State: Karnataka
- District: Mysore
- Talukas: Mysore

Government
  - Body: Town Panchayat

Area
  - Total: 17.99 km^{2} (6.95 sq mi)

Population (2011)
  - Total: 18,511
  - Density: 1,029/km^{2} (2,665/sq mi)

Languages
  - Official: Kannada
- Time zone: UTC+5:30 (IST)
- ISO 3166 code: IN-KA
- Vehicle registration: KA
- Nearest city: Mysore

Srirampura is a town and residential suburb of Mysore city in India. It is located in the Southern part of the city . It has a population of approximately 11,000 according to the 2011 census. The main landmarks of this area are Brahmarahbha Choultrey, SBM park, Madhuvana Park. There are several schools in and around this area. North of Srirampura is Vivekananda Nagar and Kuvempunagar. West of Srirampura is Ramakrishnanagar, East of Srirampura is Asokapuram. South of Srirampura is the Mananthavady-Mysore Highway. In November 2020, a gazetted notification was passed upgrading the census town to a town panchayat. The notification combines towns and villages of Srirampura, Lingambudhipalya, Gurur, Koppalur and Kalalavadi villages coming under Srirampura GP, covering a total area of 17.99 km^{2}. According to 2011 census, the town has a combined population of 18,511.

== Lingambudhi Lake ==
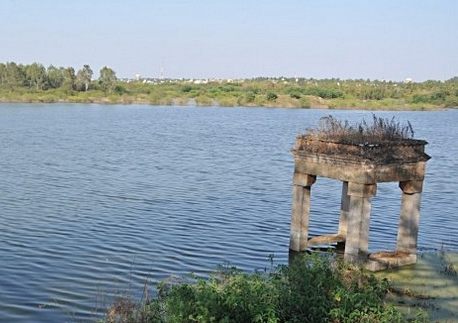
Lingambhudhi Lake

On the south western side of SRirampura, there is a lake called the Lingambudhi Lake. The Lingambudhi Lake is now a dry place with water hardly visible except on rainy season. The embankment of the lake is popular with tourists and fitness freaks. The lake is adjescent to posh residential colonies like Rabindranath Tagore Layout (R.T.Nagar).

== Demographics ==
The town has combined population of 18,511 according to 2011 census. Population breakdown is given below.

Area Name	Population According to Census 2011
Srirampura	11234
Lingambudi	277
Gurur	2292
Koppulur	4327
Kalavadi	381

== Suburbs of Srirampura ==
- Vivekananda Circle
- Mahadevapura
- SBM Colony
- Madhuvana Layout
- BEML Nagar
- Kandayanagara
- Surya layout

== Bus Route from Mysore City ==
- K.G.Koppal – Apollo Hospitals – Akshya Bandar – Nrpathunga Road
- Karuna Hospital – Vivekanands Circle – IOB Srirampur
- Mother Teresa PU – Mahavir School – Vijaya Bank Srirampur – (Srirampur Last Bus stop)

== Image gallery ==
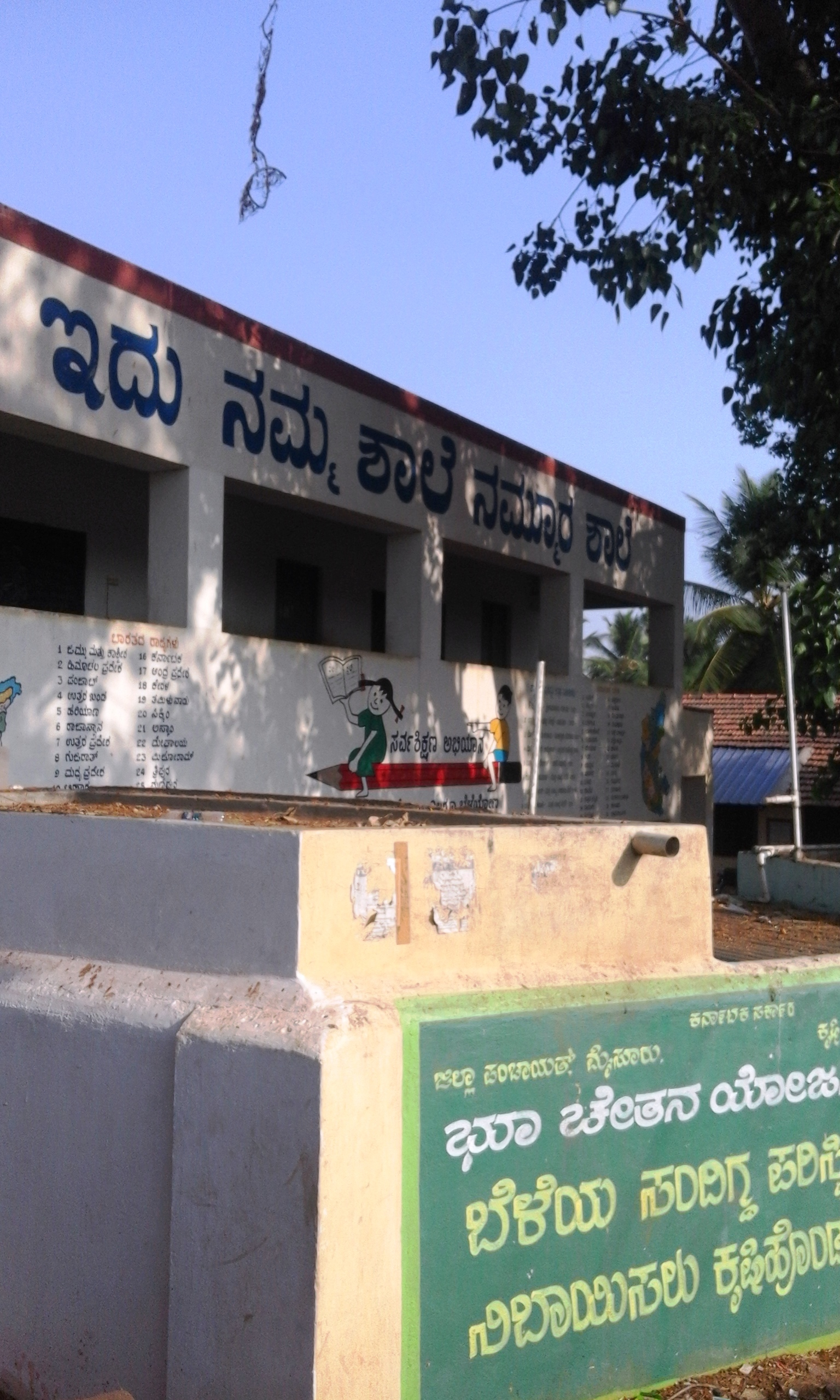
School in Srirampur

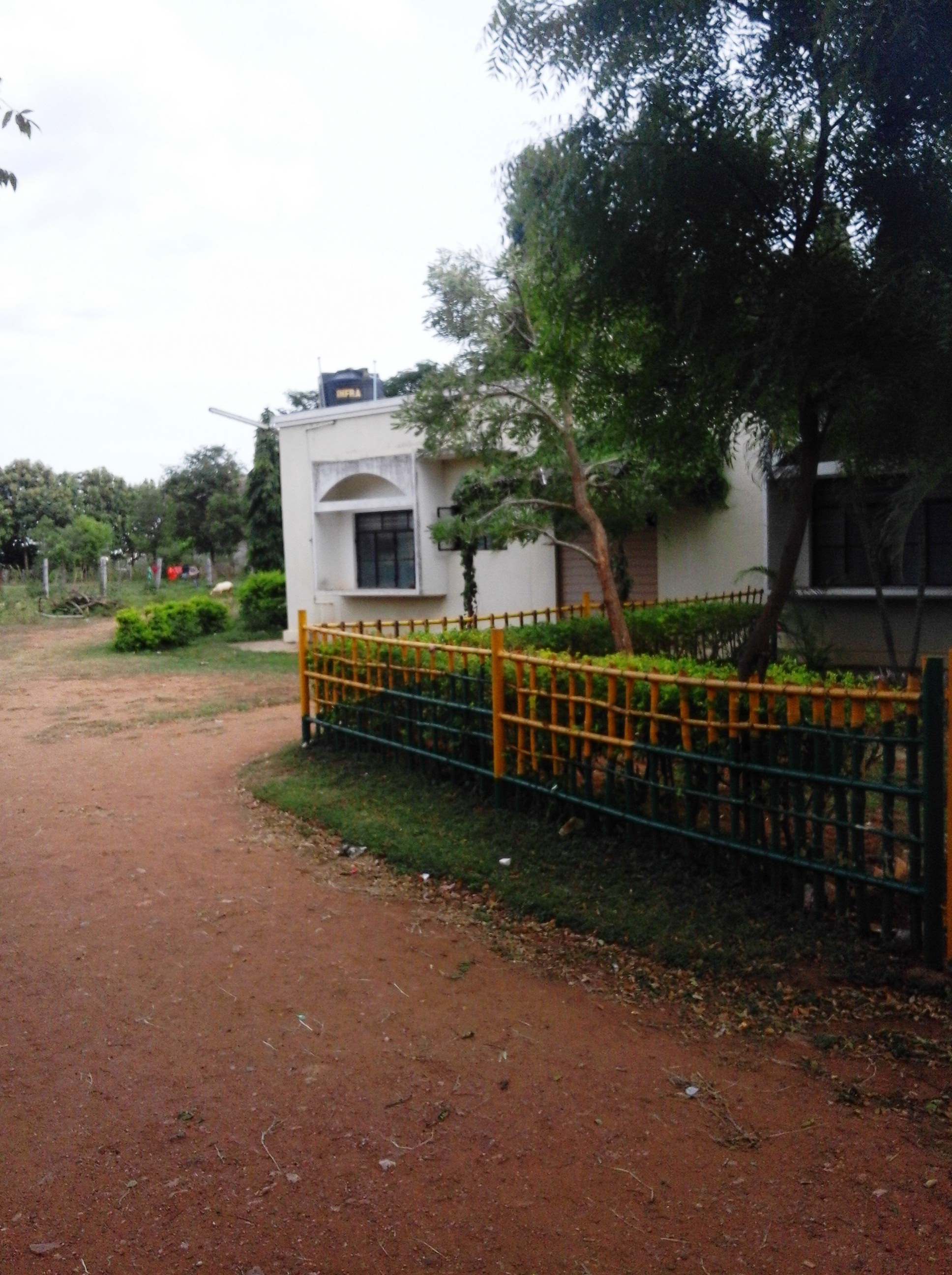
State Resource Center

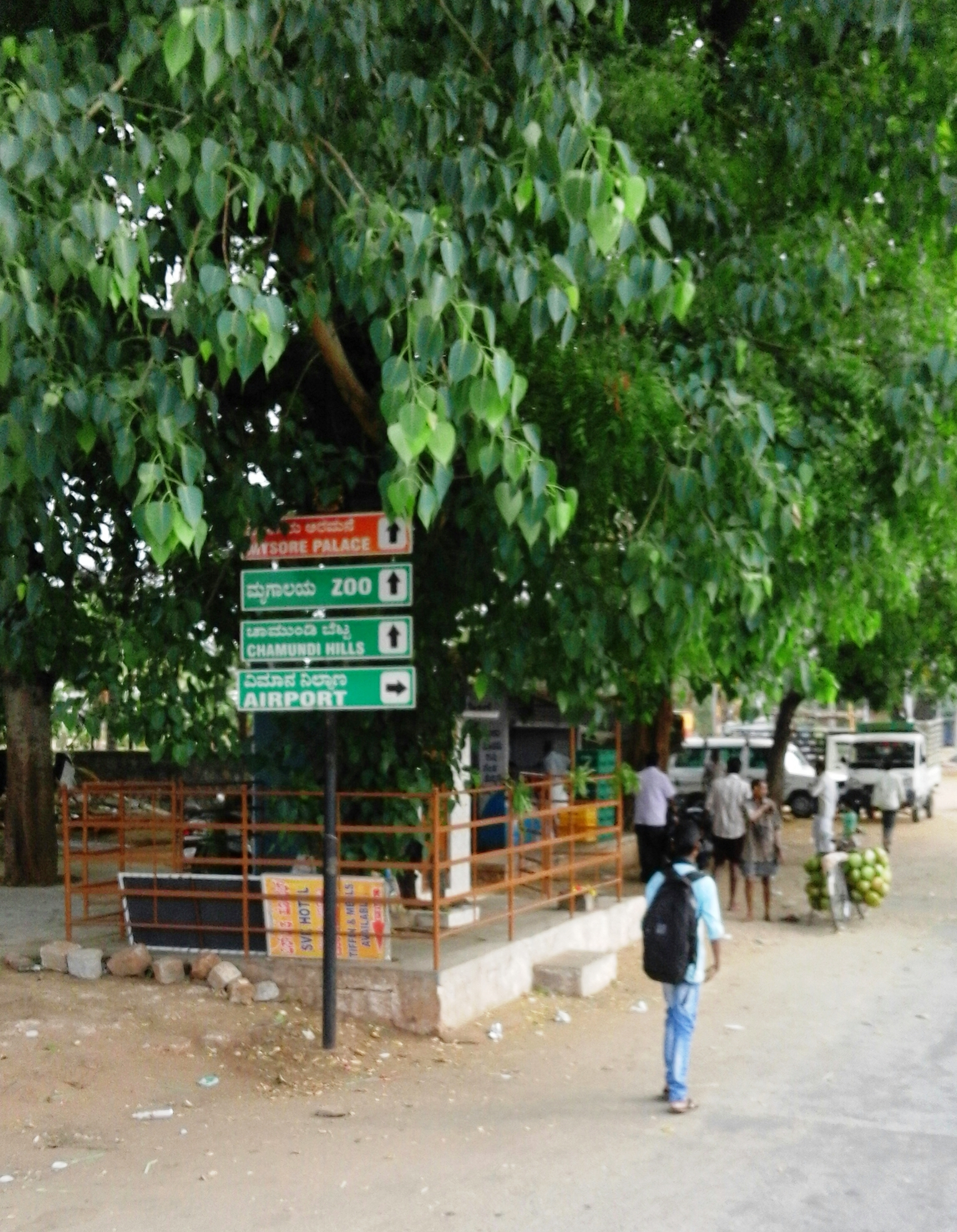
Srirampur Highway

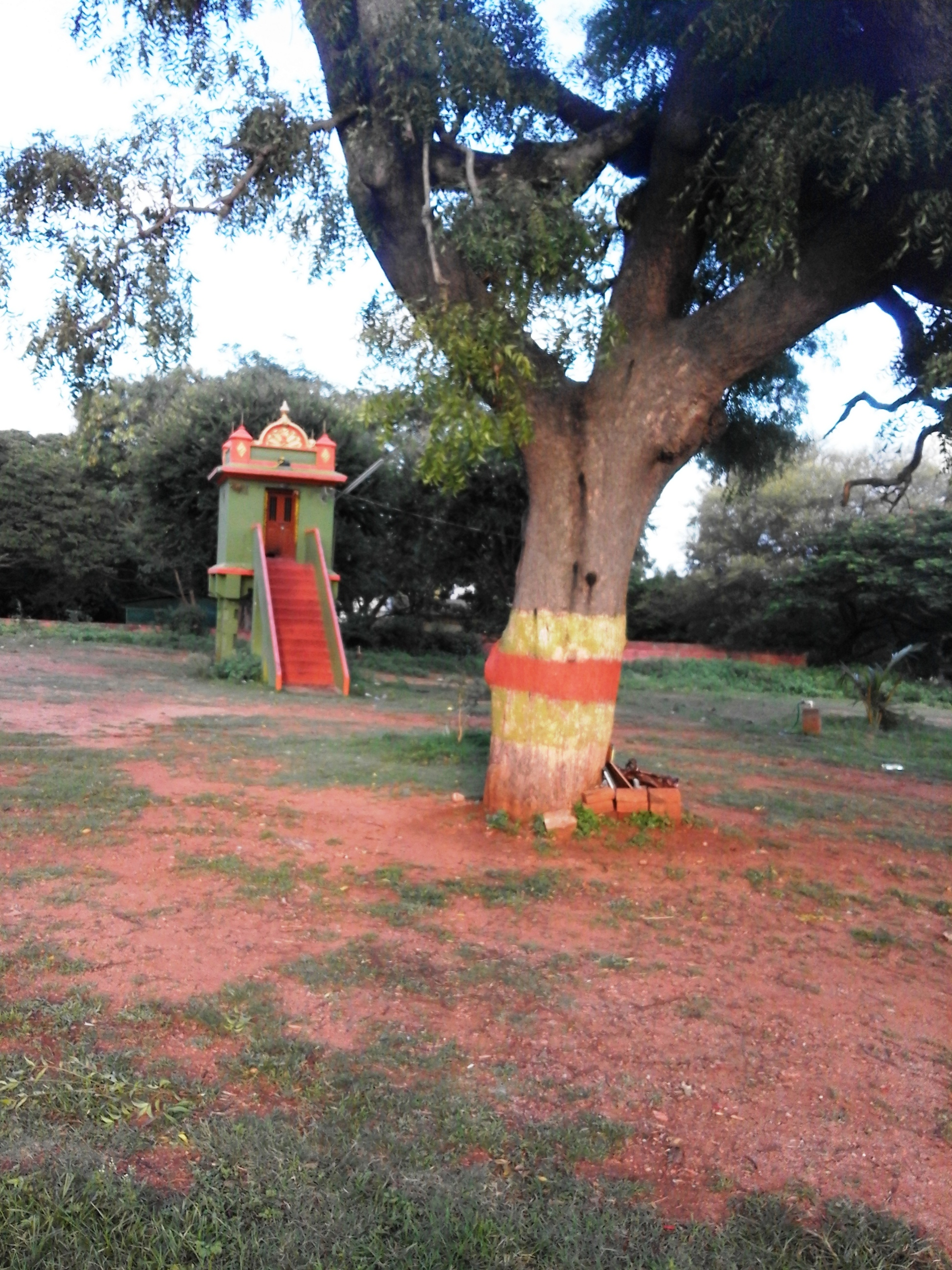
Ammari Amman Temple, Mananthavady Road

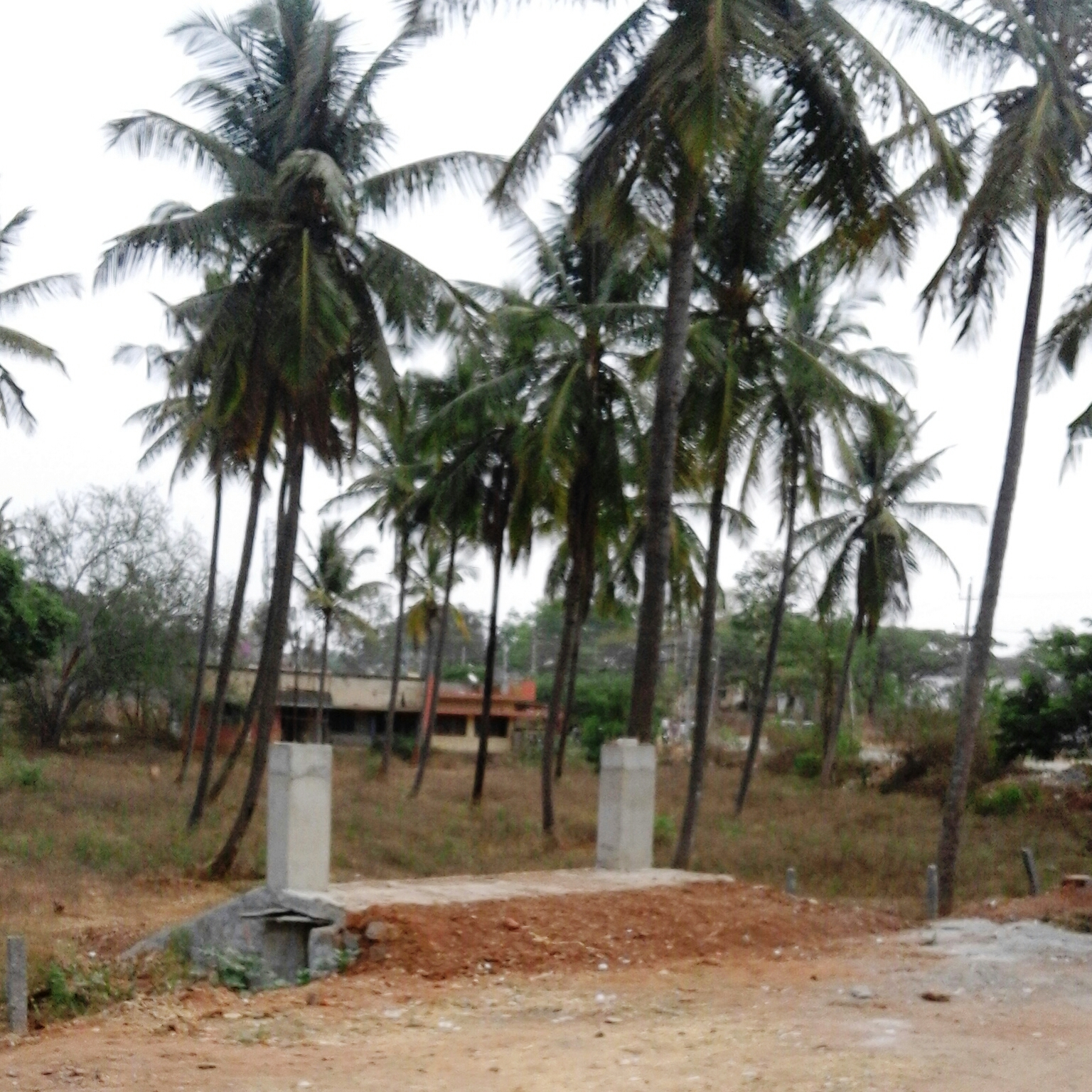

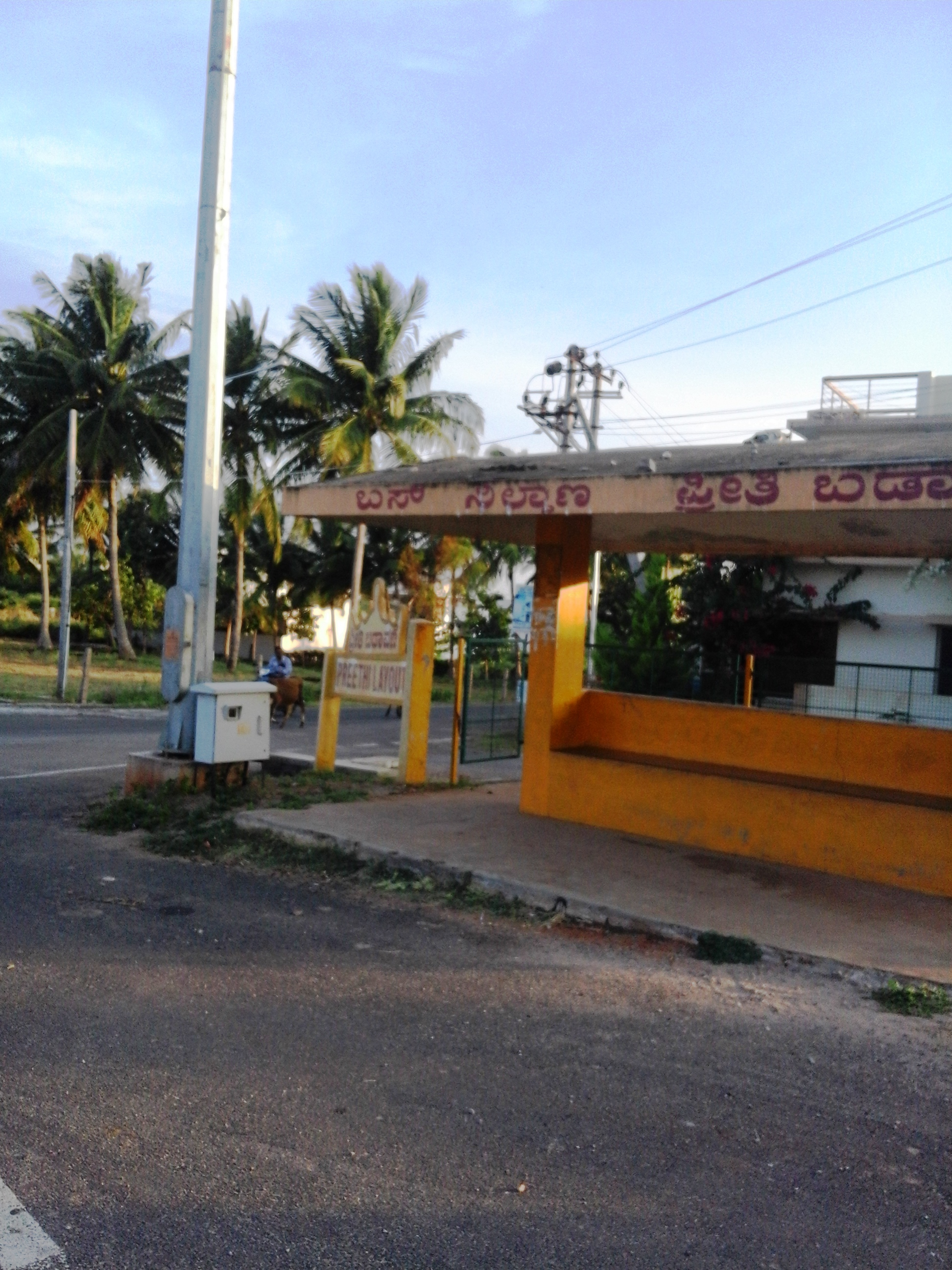

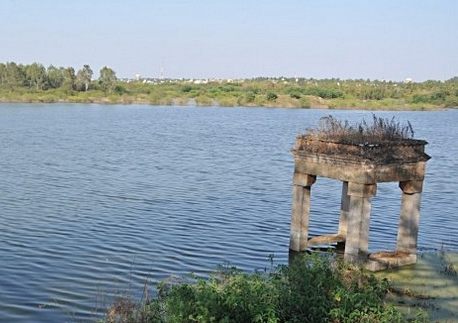

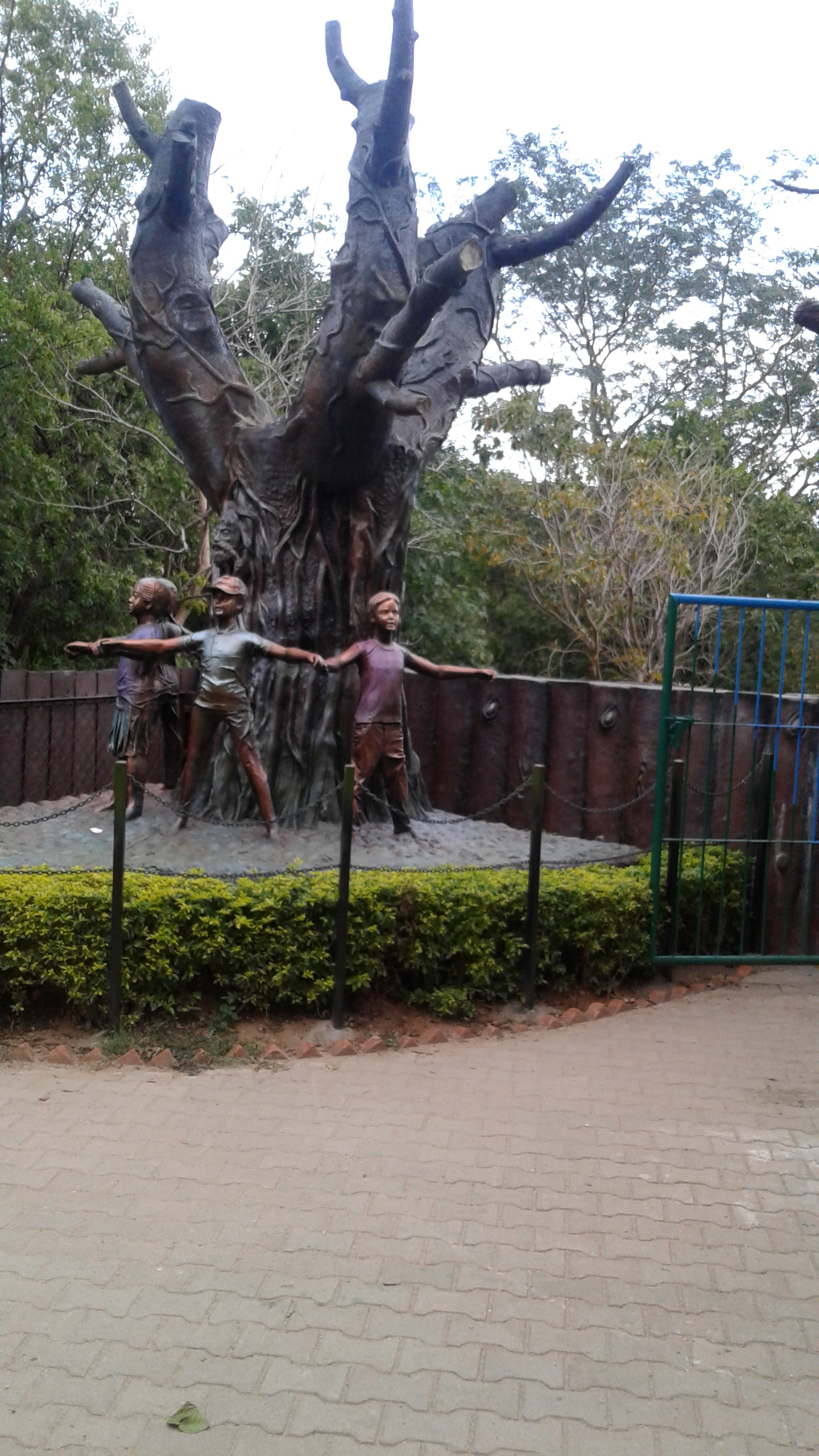

== See also ==
- Jayaprakash Nagar Mysore
- Mysore South
