= Alizad =

Alizad is a surname. Notable people with the surname include:

- Akbar Alizad (born 1973), Iranian theatre director
- Arman Alizad (born 1971), Iranian-Finnish tailor, fashion columnist, and television personality

== See also ==
- Alizadeh
