= Jawaid Iqbal (professor) =

Indian academic

- Iqbal in 2024

Vice Chancellor, Baba Ghulam Shah Badshah University
- Incumbent
- Assumed office 12 November 2024
- Preceded by: Akbar Masood

Dean, Faculty of International Studies, Aligarh Muslim University
- In office 7 July 2021 – 6 July 2023

Personal details
- Education: Jawaharlal Nehru University, Utkal University
- Profession: Professor (Teaching, Research, and Administration)

Jawaid Iqbal is an Indian academic who is the Vice-Chancellor of Baba Ghulam Shah Badshah University Rajouri J&K since November 2024. He was formerly Acting Vice-Chancellor of Aligarh Muslim University (AMU), Dean of the Faculty of International Studies, and Chair of departments of West Asian and North African Studies, South African and Brazilian Studies, and Foreign Languages at AMU. He has been part of the AMU Court, Executive Council, and Academic Council, as well as various Boards of Studies and Advisory Committees.

Iqbal holds a Ph.D. and M.Phil. in International Studies from Jawaharlal Nehru University (JNU). He has mentored doctoral and post-doctoral scholars, focusing on International Relations, Conflict Resolution, and Peace Studies.
