= Akbar Hossain =

Akbar Hossain may refer to:

- Akbar Hossain (politician) (1941–2006), Bangladeshi politician
- Akbar Hossain (journalist), Bangladeshi journalist and diplomat
- Akbar Hossain (novelist) (1917–1981), Bangladeshi novelist
- Mohammad Akbar Hossain, Bangladesh Army general
- Akbar Husain, Indian politician
