= Edgar Villanueva =

American author and activist

- Born: 1976 or 1977 (age 49–50); Raleigh, North Carolina
- Education: University of North Carolina at Chapel Hill; UNC Gillings School of Global Public Health
- Occupations: Founder and CEO, Decolonizing Wealth Project and Liberated Capital
- Website: www.edgarvillanueva.net

Edgar Villanueva is an American author and activist, and the founder and CEO of the Decolonizing Wealth Project and Liberated Capital. He published Decolonizing Wealth: Indigenous Wisdom to Heal Divides and Restore Balance in 2018.

Villanueva is known for his work on race, wealth, and philanthropy, and is an advocate for reparative philanthropy, a framework designed to allow the use of philanthropy to right historical societal inequalities, and to correct for philanthropy's past and present role in perpetuating these same inequalities.

== Early life and education ==
Villanueva was born and grew up in a poor family in Raleigh, North Carolina. Villanueva describes himself as a "Southern Christian Native American". He was raised by his mother, who worked for the DMV alongside two other jobs. Villanueva studied for a Bachelor of Arts degree in theology at Jackson College of Ministries, before he graduated from The University of North Carolina at Chapel Hill with a Bachelors in Public Health and earned a master's degree in Health Administration from UNC Gillings School of Global Public Health.

== Career ==
After completing graduate school, Villanueva worked for the American Social Health Association and the American Institutes for Research. His first role in philanthropy was as junior programming officer at the Kate B. Reynolds Charitable Trust in Winston-Salem, North Carolina in 2005, eventually becoming Senior Program Officer.

Before founding the Decolonizing Wealth Project and Liberated Capital, he held leadership positions at the Marguerite Casey Foundation in Seattle and the Schott Foundation for Public Education in New York City. Villanueva has also served on the boards of Native Americans in Philanthropy, the Andrus Family Fund, Robert Wood Johnson Foundation, NDN Collective and Mother Jones.

=== Decolonizing Wealth: Indigenous Wisdom to Heal Divides and Restore Balance (2018) ===
Villanueva published Decolonizing Wealth in 2018, which critiques the colonial dynamics in philanthropy and finance. The book argues that philanthropy is connected to the historical accumulation of wealth through enslavement and genocide, and calls for a shift towards frameworks that prioritize giving back resources and decision-making power to marginalized communities. Villanueva outlines “Seven Steps of Healing” for individuals and institutions to heal this imbalance, focused on giving back resources and decision-making power to Black, Indigenous, and other communities of color. The second edition of Decolonizing Wealth was published in 2021 with a foreword from Bishop William J. Barber II and a Spanish-language edition was published in 2022. Villanueva also published a journal, Money As Medicine, designed to guide individuals in using money for healing and restoration.

=== Decolonizing Wealth Project ===
Villanueva is the Founder and CEO of Decolonizing Wealth Project. Founded in late 2018, Decolonizing Wealth Project (DWP) states its mission is to address the impacts of colonization through education, reparative giving, and storytelling. DWP offers educational experiences, publishes reports, and creates toolkits and guides about decolonizing wealth and equity in philanthropy.

=== Liberated Capital ===
Liberated Capital is a donor community and funding vehicle founded by Villanueva and associated with the Decolonizing Wealth Project. Liberated Capital supports initiatives led by Black, Indigenous, and other people of color. According to the Decolonizing Wealth Project, Liberated Capital provided over $15 million from 2020–2024 to support initiatives focused on social, racial, and economic justice, including funding for initiatives like Villanueva's #Case4Reparations program. In 2023, Decolonizing Wealth Project announced a $20 million campaign to support the reparations movement for Black people in America. Other programs include the Indigenous Earth Fund and the California Truth and Healing Fund. The California Truth and Healing Fund provides grant support to California Native American tribes and organizations to participate in the California Truth and Healing Council and related cultural healing opportunities. The Indigenous Earth Fund is an annual grant opportunity for Indigenous-led organizations targeting climate and conservation issues.

=== Other Writing ===
Villanueva's writing has been published by The Washington Post, the Advocate, Stanford Social Innovation Review, USA Today, and Yes! Magazine.

=== Recognition and Awards ===
Villanueva was named a 2020 Atlantic Fellow for Racial Equity, a 2020 OZY Media Angelic Troublemaker, was among the 2021 Nonprofit Times Power & Influence Top 50 and 2021 Inside Philanthropy Power List. Villanueva and his work have been featured in the New York Times, NPR, Teen Vogue, Vox, and Forbes.

== Personal life ==
Villanueva resides in Brooklyn, New York City. Villanueva is an enrolled member of the Lumbee Tribe of North Carolina. Villanueva is queer.
