= Masud Choudhary =

Indian police officer (1944–2022)

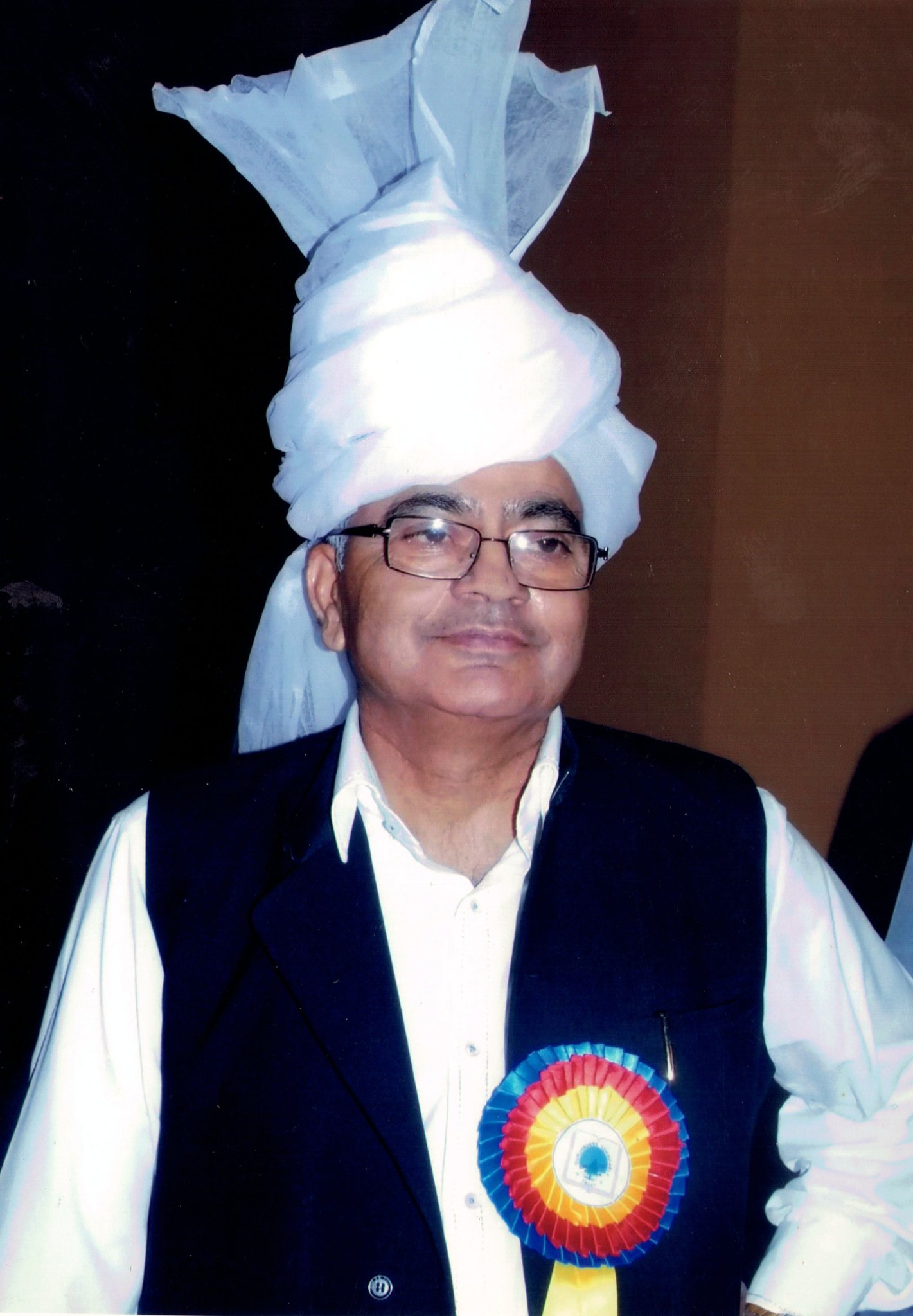
- Born: 10 April 1944; Mendhar, Jammu and Kashmir, British Raj
- Died: 16 December 2022 (aged 78); Gandhinagar, Jammu
- Children: Arafat Masud, Naziya Choudhary, Yasmin Choudhary

Masud Choudhary (10 April 1944 – 16 December 2022) was an Indian civil servant, educator, social reformer, thinker and an administrator of Jammu and Kashmir union territory. He was the founding Vice Chancellor of Baba Ghulam Shah Badshah University in Rajouri, J&K. He was also the Chief Patron of the Muslim Gurjar Desh Charitable Trust. Choudhary served in the police and retired as the Additional Director of the General Police (IPS) in 2004.

== Early life ==
Born in a middle-class Bajar Gujjar family in Kalaban, a village near Line of Control in Poonch District in Jammu and Kashmir Masud Choudhary's father, Babu Faiz Ahmed was also an educator.

== Biographic Account ==
The first biography of Dr. Masud Ahmed Choudhary compiled by Ghani Ghayoor and Dr. Shams Kamal Anjum was released at Gurjardesh Charitable Trust auditorium by former Chief Minister Dr. Farooq Abdullah on 18 January 2021. The book contains research articles about Masud Choudhary – a living hero of Jammu and Kashmir who created many institutions of literacy to reduce the darkness of illiteracy and to end backwardness and ignorance faced by marginalized groups. He spent his whole life for the betterment of his tribal community and other downtrodden groups. For his lifetime contributions, he was awarded as 'Fakhr e Qoum wa Milat' A Lifetime Achievement Award in presence of tribal elders.

== Police career ==
As a Law Graduate from Aligarh Muslim University, he began his career in Jammu and Kashmir Police as a Deputy Superintendent of Police in 1967. He served in a number of assignments, as the District Police Chief of Jammu, Poonch, Kathua, Udhampur including Senior Superintendent of Police, Srinagar in Kashmir and also as SSP Vigilance Jammu and CID SB Jammu. As Deputy Inspector General of Police he was posted DIG Vigilance J&K, DIG Jammu-Kathua range; DIG Administration PHQ; Director Police Academy, Udhampur; Inspector General of Police, Crime and Railway; and, Additional Director General Police in Jammu and Kashmir. He became the first Gujjar of Jammu and Kashmir to rise to the rank of Additional Director General of Police in Indian Police Service in 2002. His last position was as Additional Director General, Headquarters. He retired from the IPS in 2004.

== Baba Ghulam Shah Badshah University ==
Choudhary was the founder and Vice-Chancellor of Baba Ghulam Shah Badshah University located in the border district of Rajouri, 150 km from Jammu. The university came into existence by an Act of the Jammu and Kashmir Legislative Assembly in 2002.

In 2012, the university awarded him the honorary degree of Doctor of Letters for his extraordinary contributions to Indian society, especially in the fields of education and social development. The Community has celebrated this honour across the State of Jammu and Kashmir.

== Contributions ==
Choudhary set up the Gurjar Desh Charitable Trust in Jammu in 1989, a voluntary organization established with the objective of improving the condition of the tribal and marginalised community of Jammu and Kashmir. His efforts have won national and international recognition. Other aims of this trust are Preservation, documentation and publication of tribal rare unwritten medicinal and other herbal knowledge, documentation of the tribal cultural heritage and suggesting ways and means of preserving and promoting it, making a study of the tribal handicrafts and undertaking measures to revive and boost their handicrafts. Making such exercise income-oriented, giving boost to social and cultural activities by organizing cultural meets besides development of tribal arts and artifacts.

== Awards ==
- Police Medal for Meritorious Service (1985)
- Presidents Police Medal for Distinguished Service (1994).
- Sher-e-Kashmir Police Medal for Distinguished Service.
- Fakhar-e-Qoum by Adabi Sangat Kashmir.
- Fakhr-e-Qaum-wa-Millat by Gurjardesh Charitable Trust
