= Akbar Ali (poet) =

Indian poet and politician (1925–2016)

- Born: 3 March 1925; Khanapur, Belgaum, Karnataka, India
- Died: 21 February 2016 (aged 90); Kuvempunagar, Mysore, Karnataka, India
- Occupation: Poet

Akbar Ali (3 March 1925 – 21 February 2016) was an Indian Kannada poet from Karnataka, India. On 28 July 1986, Governor nominated him as the Member of Karnataka Legislative Council (1986 - 1992).

== Early life and background ==
Akbar Ali was born to Ameerbi and Appa Saheb from Ullagaddi village of Khanapur, Belgaum district. He started writing poems from his school days and the poem "Sumana Somabha" was awarded by the State Sahitya Academy.

Ali served as a college lecturer for 14 years at Arts and Science College, Karwar, Lecturer for 10 years at The Institute of Correspondence Course and Continuing Education, Mysore University.

== Career ==
He was awarded the Sumana Saurabha - Karnataka State Sahitya Academy award in 1967 and 1984. In 1986, he became a Member of the Karnataka Vidhan Parishad (Legislative Council).

== Death ==
In February 2016, Ali died of thyroid cancer at his residence in Kuvempunagar. He is survived by three sons and three daughters.
