= Amna Akbar =

American academic

- Citizenship: United States
- Occupations: Law professor; Legal scholar; Attorney
- Known for: Research on social movements, policing, race, and inequality; Editor-in-Chief of Michigan Law Review
- Awards: Freedom Scholar Award, Marguerite Casey Foundation (2021)

Academic background
- Education: Barnard College (BA); University of Michigan Law School (JD)

Academic work
- Discipline: Law
- Sub-discipline: Social movements; Policing; Race and inequality; Critical legal studies
- Institutions: Harvard Law School (Visiting Professor, 2023–2024); University of Pennsylvania Carey Law School (Visiting Professor, 2023–2024); Ohio State University Moritz College of Law (former); New York University School of Law (former); CUNY School of Law (former)

Amna Akbar is an American academic and professor of law. She is a Sullivan & Cromwell Visiting professor of law at Harvard University and previously worked at the Ohio State University Moritz College of Law. She studies social movements, policing, race, and inequality. She was named a 2021 Freedom Scholar.

== Work ==
Akbar's work has appeared in several law journals, and she also publishes popular essays and op-eds. For 2023 to 2024, Akbar taught as a visiting professor at Harvard Law School and the University of Pennsylvania Carey School of Law.

Professor Akbar also taught at New York University School of Law and the City University of New York (CUNY) School of Law. She earned a B.A. from Barnard College and a J.D. from the University of Michigan. At the University of Michigan, she was editor-in-chief of the Michigan Law Review.

Akbar clerked for Judge Gerard E. Lynch in the US District Court for the Southern District of New York and worked as an attorney.

== Awards ==
In 2021, Akbar and five other scholars were given a Freedom Scholar Award by the Marguerite Casey Foundation for leading research in the fields of "abolitionist, Black, feminist, queer, radical, and anti-colonialist studies". The annual award amounts to $250,000 over two years, which the scholars may use however they like.
