= Akber Ali Wahidi =

Pakistani sports statistician, journalist (1957–2011)

- Born: Syed Akber Ali Wahidi; 7 August 1957; Karachi, Pakistan
- Died: 25 April 2011 (aged 53); Faisalabad, Pakistan
- Education: BA; Civil engineering
- Alma mater: NED University of Engineering & Technology
- Occupations: Sports statistician, journalist, writer, historian
- Years active: 1974–2011
- Organization: Pakistan Football Federation
- Children: 1

Syed Akber Ali Wahidi (7 August 1957 – 25 April 2011) was a Pakistani sports statistician, writer, journalist, historian and media manager of the Pakistan Football Federation. Often referred to in Pakistan as "Walking Encyclopedia of Football", his work such as history, statistics and records was primarily focused on football and field hockey. He is also known for his statistical analysis which replaced the FIFA's record books entry for the second fastest goalscorer after then second-placed record holder Bryan Robson was replaced by Václav Mašek while Robson's second fastest goalscorer entry was corrected to the first division. In 2010, FIFA offered him a visit for match coverage in the 2010 FIFA World Cup.

== Early life ==
He was born in Karachi, Pakistan. He did his BA degree in civil engineering from the NED University of Engineering & Technology. After completing his education, he left civil engineering and started working as a sports writer for football in particular.

== Career ==
He started his career in 1974 as a sports journalist and wrote in both Urdu and English language. He initially earned his recognition after he started writing for an Urdu magazine Khel ki Dunya. As an executive editor, he also worked for the now defunct sports Urdu language football gazette Monthly Football Magazine.

In 1992, he made his association with the National Football Championship as a tournament media in-charge which was for the for time sponsored by Lifebuoy soap in Pakistan. He was also offered media manager post by Pakistan Hockey Federation and Pakistan Cricket Board but he refused to accept the proposal and worked for football. The Pakistan Football Federation took notice of Wahidi's knowledge, writing skills, and experience and made him Media Manager in 2004.

== Death ==
Wahidi died on 25 April 2011 of cardiac arrest when he was covering the 2011 National Football Challenge Cup in Faisalabad. He was 53 years old, with cause of death determined as cardiac arrest suffered during his sleep at his hotel room in Faisalabad. His body was shifted by air from Faisalabad to his native city of Nazimabad in Karachi for burial. Wahidi left behind a widow, and a young son.
