= Ackbar Khan =

Ackbar Khan (born 19 July 1931) is ex officio Commissioner of Affidavits from 1963 and was the youngest appointed Justice of the Peace (JP) of the Republic of Trinidad and Tobago.

A social worker all his life, Khan was born to a poor family, one of eleven children to Mohammed [Fatty] & Sarefan Khan. Khan became the sole breadwinner for his family after his father died in 1948. He also took care of his mother until she died in 1996. At the age of 16 he worked for the Trinidad Steam Laundry. He founded Century21 Janitorial and Caribbean Airduct services. He took up his passion for social work at a young age.

Since his teen years he has worked in the Sangre Grande Magistrates' Court. Khan’s first recognised act as a humanitarian was when he took a group of scout troopers to Tobago for one week. At the age of 28 Khan, a scout master, organised a boat to transport 11 scout troupers stranded in Tobago back to Trinidad when there were no available boats. Khan then spoke about the incident on live radio at that time about the incident which the then Government opposed and as a result caused Khan embarrassment to him and his company.

Khan became a local symbol when he assisted numerous churches and mosques, by raising funds through raffles, donations, BBQ and other fund raising events. The proceeds went towards the homeless and needy.

Khan, with his wife, owns and operates several janitorial service companies. Throughout his life, he has also been involved with social concerns, working with the Himalaya Club and scouting.
