= Akbar Khazaei =

Iranian bodybuilding judge (born 1980)

- اکبر خزایی
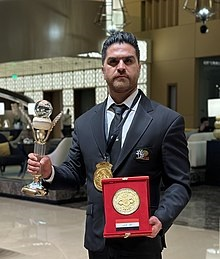
- Born: August 11, 1980 (age 46); Tehran, Iran
- Known for: The first and only Iranian international professional bodybuilding judge
- Website: akbarkhazaei.com

Akbar Khazaei (Persian: اکبر خزایی; born August 11, 1980, in Tehran, Iran) is the first and only Iranian international professional bodybuilding judge. He was firstly an international amateur judge of the International Federation of bodybuilding and Fitness (IFBB) but later, he was appointed as the first professional judge of IFBB PRO bodybuilding competitions with an Iranian nationality.

== Early life and amateur career ==
Akbar Khazaei became interested in Taekwondo in 1989 at the age of 9, and started wrestling in 1993 when he was 13. In 1994, when he was only 14 years old, he chose bodybuilding and after that he exclusively focused on bodybuilding-related scientific studies in this field. In 2001, Khazaei participated in the provincial bodybuilding competitions for the first time and won the gold medal in the Tehran Bodybuilding Competition. Afterwards, he won several first titles in bodybuilding competitions in Tehran province, however due to an injury in his leg thigh, he had to withdraw from bodybuilding competitions and started working as a coach. Akbar khazaei married Akram Azizi in 2002 . He has a daughter named Ghazaleh and a son named Parsa.

== Appointment as an IFBB Official Judge ==
In 2006, he obtained a bodybuilding judgement certificate from Iranian Bodybuilding Federation and in 2007, upon taking part in IFBB judging classes in Thailand, he received the IFBB Judgment Permission and the Asian Bodybuilding and Physique Sports Federation (ABBF) referee book from this Confederation. In this way, at the age of 27, he succeeded to reach the position of Asian international judge as the youngest one. Afterwards, Khazaei was appointed as the first coach of the Iranian national fitness team in 2013. In 2015, he was appointed as an international judge of the International Federation of Bodybuilding and Fitness Federation (IFBB). Since then, the fame of this bodybuilding judge began with his activity in the international bodybuilding judgment profession.

== Judging IFBB PRO ==
In 2022, Akbar Khazaei quit the profession of amateur judge by entering IFBB PRO and has been working as the only Iranian international professional judge, while holding a professional judge card from the IFBB. The reason for the importance of IFBB PRO professional judgment position is that few people in the world have been appointed as a professional bodybuilding judge, and Akbar Khazaei is the first and only Iranian one who is a professional judge in international bodybuilding competitions, namely, IFBB PRO

Akbar Khazaei has judged the bodybuilding competitions including Mr. Olympia in Tunisia, Iraq and Pakistan as well as Ashour Classic in Libya. After several cases of judging, he drew attention of the officials of (NPC) bodybuilding competitions, and since then he has been among the world's professional judges.

He is currently living in Iran as a professional IFBB PRO bodybuilding judge and is sent to different countries to judge professional bodybuilding competitions and amateur and professional Mr. Olympia competitions. In addition, he is the head coach of a fitness and bodybuilding gym in Tehran.

== U.S Visa for Judging Mr.Olympia 2022 in Las Vegas ==
In 2022, Khazaei was invited to judge the American National Physique Committee (NPC) Bodybuilding Competition as well as the 2022 Las Vegas Mr. Olympia, but the American Embassy in Oman refused his visa application, so was not sent to judge these professional competitions.

== Morocco bodybuilding competitions ==
Akbar Khazaei was invited to judge in Morocco's NPC 2023 competition, the champions of this competition can participate in the competitions required to enter the US Master Olympia competition by obtaining a professional card.

== Domestic and international bodybuilding judging records ==
- Judge and Head Judge of provincial and national competitions in Iran/ From 2006 to March, 2022
- International judgment of all IFBB Diamond Cup competitions/ From 2005 to 2009
- Internationally and Professionally Judging IFBB PRO Mr. Olympia competitions in Tunisia/ Second and third quarter of 2022
- Internationally and Professionally Judging IFBB PRO Ashour Classic competitions in Libya/ Second and third quarter of 2022
- Internationally and Professionally Judging IFBB PRO Muscle Show international professional judgeing in Iraq, Sulaymaniyah 2022
- Internationally and Professionally Judging IFBB PRO Mr. Olympia competitions in Pakistan, Islamabad/ Second and third quarter of 2022
- Internationally and Professionally Judging IFBB PRO Ashour Classic competitions in Libya/ December, 2022
- Internationally and Professionally Judging IFBB PRO Mr. Olympia competitions in Tunisia/ December, 2022
- Internationally and Professionally Judging IFBB PRO Muscle Show international professional judgeing in Iraq, Sulaymaniyah 2023

== Honors and qualifications ==
The honors and qualifications of Akbar Khazaei, the international professional judge, include the following:

- The top Iranian coach in 2011
- The former coach of Iran's national fitness team in 2013
- Graduated from Islamic Azad University, Yadgar-e-Imam Branch, in the major of Physical Education and Sports Sciences
- Bodybuilding international judge of Iranian National Olympic Committee
- 1st grade judge of the Asian Confederation of Bodybuilding
- 1st grade bodybuilding coach of the Iranian Ministry of Sports and Youth and the Iranian Bodybuilding Federation
- International bodybuilding coach of the Iranian Ministry of Sports and Youth and the Iranian Bodybuilding Federation
- Bodybuilding and fitness instructor at FIMA University of England
- Sports talent technician of Australian ISAC Association
- The first and only professional judge of IFBB pro bodybuilding in Iran
- Holding IFBB PRO international professional judgement card
- NPC professional bodybuilding coach
- Teaching Master's Course in Bodybuilding Coaching
