= Akbar Muradov =

Azerbaijani Paralympic sport shooter

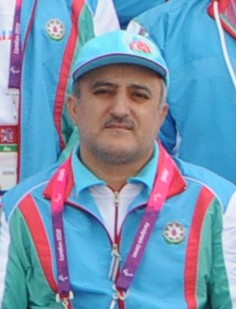

Personal information
- Born: 30 June 1968 (age 57)
- Height: 170 sm
- Weight: 70 kg (154 lb)

Sport
- Country: Azerbaijan
- Club: Neftchi (Baku)
Medal record
Shooting
World Cup
Bronze medal – third place	Antalya 2010	10m air pistol
Bronze medal – third place	Volmerange-les-Mines 2010	50m pistol team
Bronze medal – third place	Alicante 2011	10m pistol team
European Championships
Bronze medal – third place	Suhl 2007	10m air pistol

Akbar Muradov is an Azerbaijani paralympic sport shooter, bronze medalist of 2007 European Championships in Suhl and 2010 World Cup in Antalya and in Volmerange-les-Mines. Akbar Muradov is the 5th in World Ranking List in Men's 10m Air Pistol. He presented Azerbaijan on 2012 Summer Paralympics. Muradov acquired his disability during the First Nagorno-Karabakh War.
