= Akbar Masood =

Vice Chancellor

Professor Akbar Masood (2021)

Akbar Masood is an Indian academic who was the Vice Chancellor of Baba Ghulam Shah Badshah University in Jammu and Kashmir until October 2024. He had served as the Dean of Academic Affairs at the University of Kashmir. He has an MSc from Aligarh Muslim University and a PhD from the Indian Institute of Toxicology Research. He remained associated with the Department of Biochemistry at the University of Kashmir as a member of the faculty since 1988. He was appointed Vice-Chancellor of Baba Ghulam Shah Badshah University in February 2021.

He was named a Fellow of the Royal Society of Chemistry in 2010.
