= Baba Ghulam Shah Badshah University =

University in Jammu and Kashmir

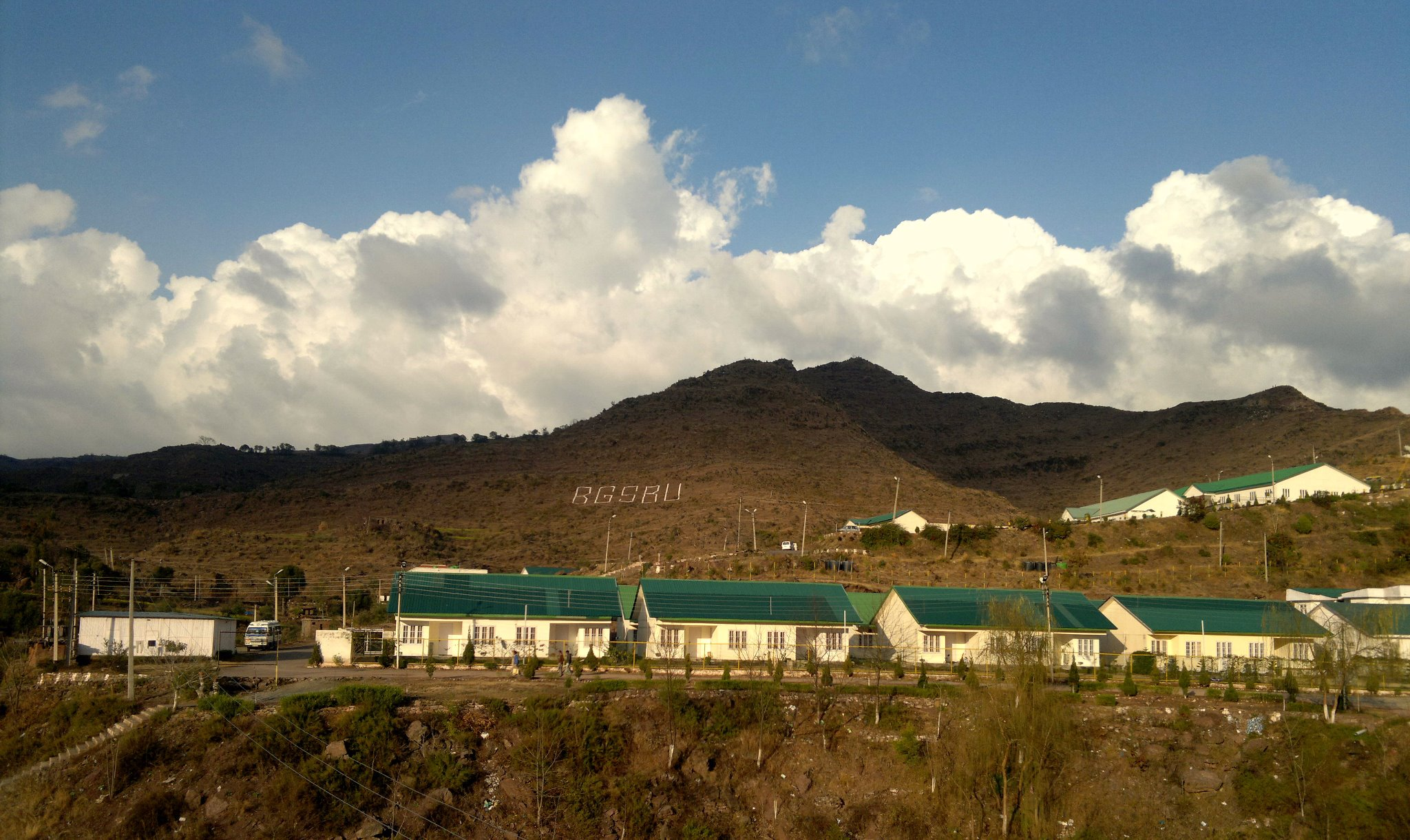
- Type: Public state university
- Established: 2002; 24 years ago
- Academic affiliations: UGC; AIU
- Chancellor: Lieutenant Governor of Jammu and Kashmir
- Vice-Chancellor: Jawaid Iqbal
- Faculty: 155
- Students: 2,294 (2022–23)
- Location: Rajouri, Jammu and Kashmir, India; 33°23′43″N 74°20′50″E
- Campus: Rural; approximately 10 km outside Rajouri city
- Website: www.bgsbu.ac.in

Baba Ghulam Shah Badshah University is a public state university located near Rajouri in the Jammu division of the Indian union territory of Jammu and Kashmir. It is regulated by the University Grants Commission, and a member of the Association of Indian Universities. The vice-chancellor, Jawaid Iqbal, was appointed in November 2024.

== History ==
Legislation to establish the university was passed in 2002 by the Jammu and Kashmir Legislative Assembly, and the university was in full operation by 2005, led by the founding vice-chancellor Masud Choudhary. It is named for the Pir Panjal sufi Baba Ghulam Shah Badshah, whose shrine is located in Shahadra Sharief, a village close by in Rajouri district. The shrine made a one-off donation of 330,000,000 rupees to help fund the construction and establishment of the university, and, as of 2012, donates 20,000,000 rupees per year in ongoing funding.

In 2020, the university received a band A ranking in the Atal Ranking of Institutions on Innovation Achievements (ARIIA) exercise carried out by India's Ministry of Education. In 2021, it was ranked 35th in the India Today-MDRA Best Universities Survey in the government university category.

== Students, staff and courses ==
In the 2022-23 academic year, the university had 2,294 students, 155 teaching staff, and 254 sanctioned posts.

According to the university's website, it offers courses in computer science, information technology, mathematics, engineering, bioscience, nursing, business management, social sciences, education, tourism, and languages including Arabic. In addition to a number of diplomas, the university awards B.A., M.A., B.Sc., M.Sc., B.Ed., M.Ed., BBA, MBA, B.Tech., B.Voc, and M.Phil. degrees. The university also accepts Ph.D. students, and awarded 25 Ph.D. degrees in 2022-23.
