= Kautilya Vidyalaya, Mysore =

Higher secondary school in Mysore, India

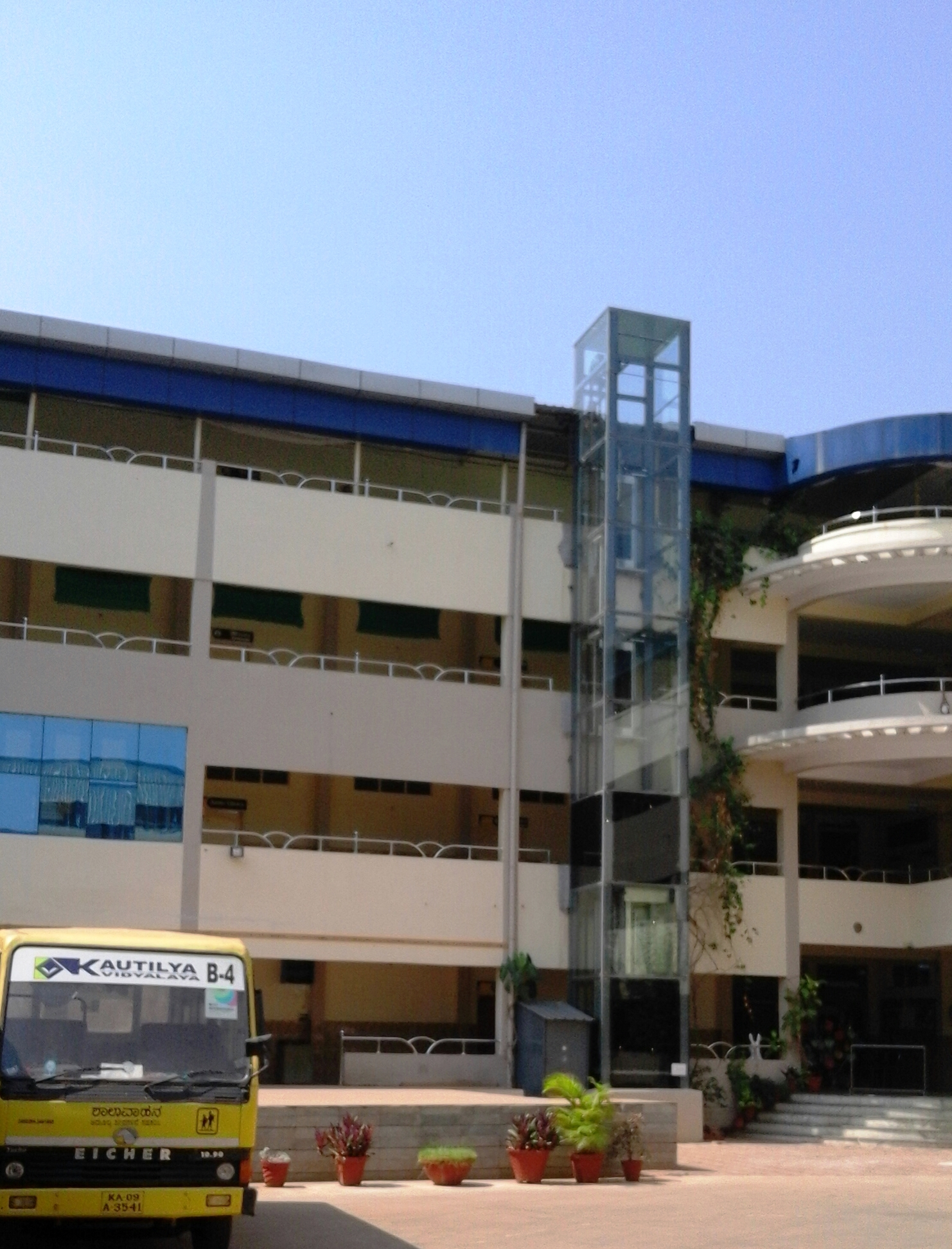
Kautilya Vidyalaya, Mysore

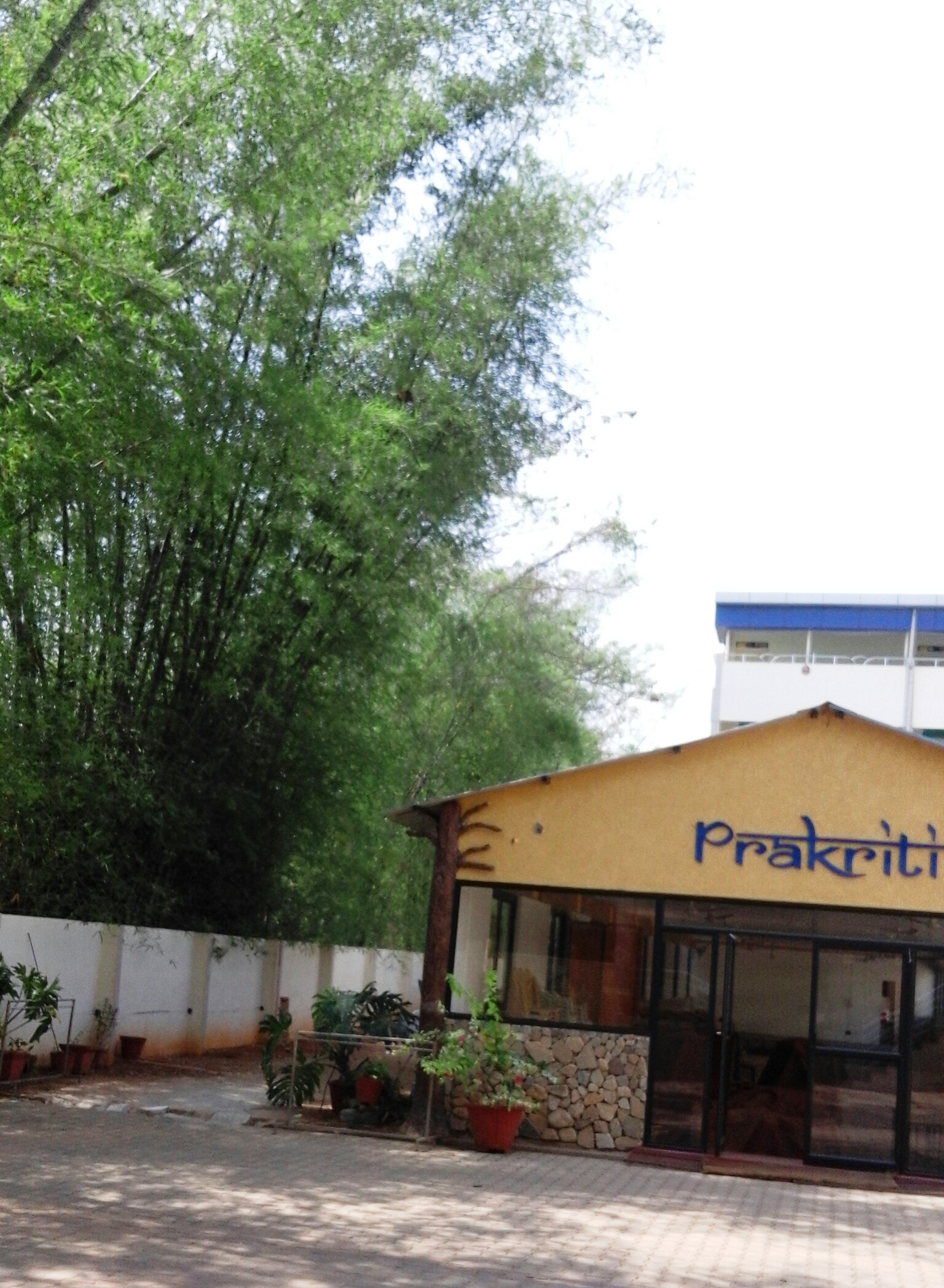
School canteen at Kautliya

Kautilya Vidyalaya is a higher secondary school located in Mysore, Karnataka, India. The school has grades from kindergarten to pre-university levels.

== History ==
The school was established in 2007 and got CBSE affiliation in 2008. The school is managed by J. Ranganna Lakshmamma Charitable Trust. In 2018, the school won the British Council International School Award. In 2019, it won the Wipro Earthian Award.

== Facilities ==
The school was built in an area of two acres. There are laboratories and libraries for high school and junior college sections. Atal Tinkering Laboratory was inaugurated in September 2017. A Celestia Aerospace lab was inaugurated in February 2025.
