= Marguerite Casey Foundation =

Nonprofit organization in Seattle, United States

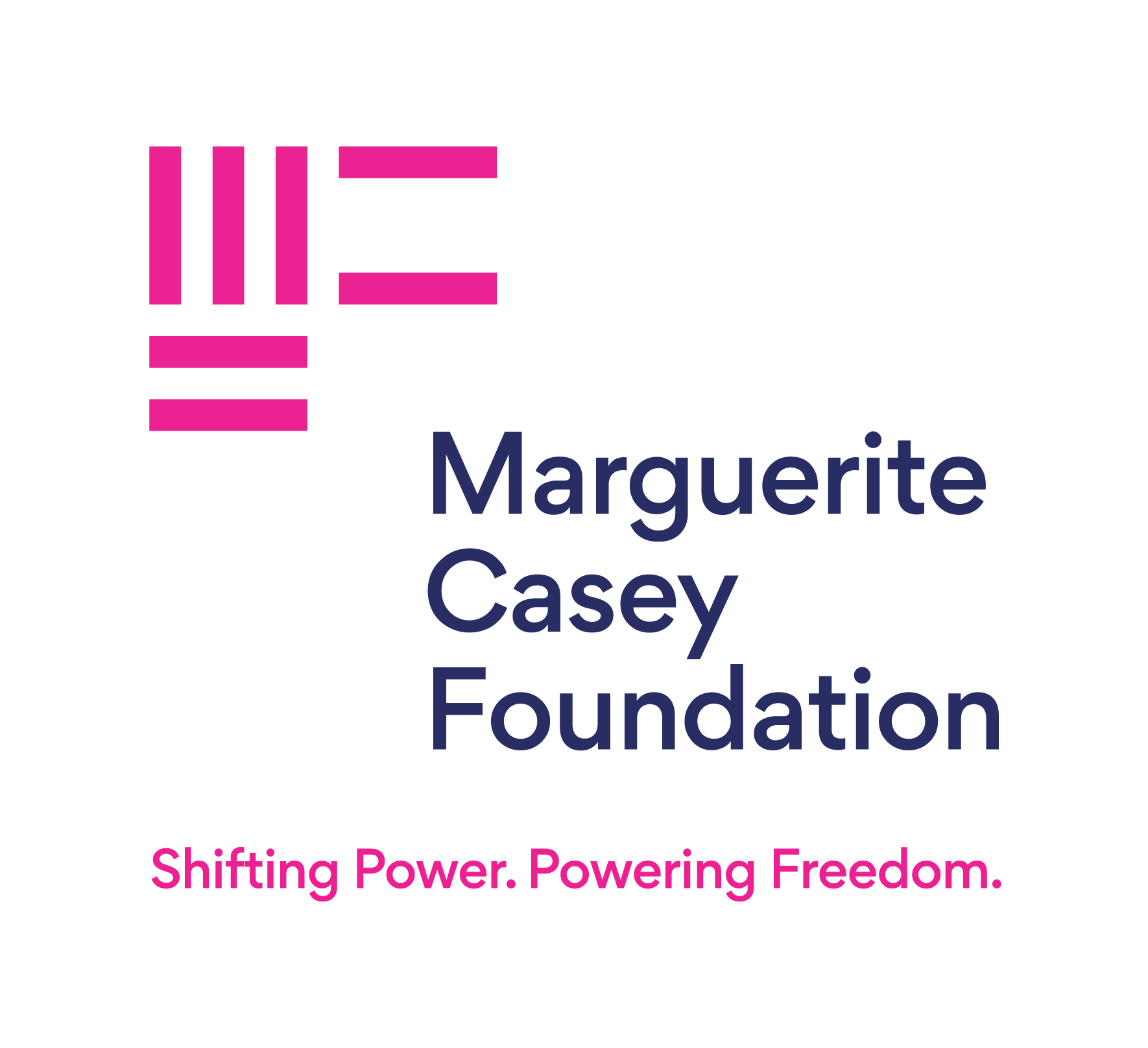
- Formation: 2001
- Type: Grantmaking Foundation
- Headquarters: Seattle, Washington, United States
- President and CEO: Carmen Rojas
- Board Chair: Ian Fuller
- Key people: Ellis Carr; Zeke Smith; Rami Nashashibi
- Expenses: $38,982,043 (2018)
- Website: www.caseygrants.org

Marguerite Casey Foundation (formerly called the Casey Family Grants Program) is a private, independent grantmaking foundation located in Seattle, Washington. The foundation was created in 2001 by Casey Family Programs. Marguerite Casey Foundation supports leaders, scholars and initiatives focused on shifting the balance of power in society — building power for communities that continue to be excluded from shaping how society works and from sharing in its rewards and freedoms. Carmen Rojas, has been the president and CEO since 2020.

== History ==
Jim Casey, the founder of United Parcel Service, established Casey Family Programs in 1966. When UPS went public in 1997, the Casey Programs’ endowment rose from $700 million to over $2 billion. Casey Family Programs decided to use the new resources to create a new foundation focused on grantmaking. The foundation is named for Jim Casey's sister, Marguerite.

== Grantmaking ==
For the year ended December 31, 2019, Marguerite Casey Foundation reported $804,678,765 in total assets and dispersed $38,982,043 in grants. The foundation makes grants to national organizations and also in four distinct geographic regions: Midwest, South, Southwest, and West. It also funded grants in Washington State from 2004 to 2011, when the Home State Fund was discontinued.

In 2025, Marguerite Casey Foundation announced it was leveraging its endowment to increase its grants payout by fivefold "to help nonprofits respond to policy changes from the Trump administration, especially federal funding cuts and what it calls threats to the independence of civil society organizations."
