= Akbar Alizad =

Theater director in Iran

Ali Akbar Alizad (Persian: علی اکبر علیزاد; born 1973) is an Iranian theater director, known mostly for his performance of Waiting for Godot (2006). Alizad has been a member of the Aein Theater Group and the Leev Theater Group for 10 years, and in 2006 he founded his theatrical group named 84theater.

== Career ==
Alizad is a lecturer at the Cinema & Theater College, University of Art since 2004, teaching drama analysis, playwriting, and dramatic principles.

He was also a member of the Aeein Theater Group from 1991 to 2004 and a member of the Leev Theater Group from 2004. In 2009, he met Noel Greig in Tehran to hold a workshop where Alizad translated his book; Playwriting: A Practical Guide, into Persian.

=== Performances 2005–2009 ===
- Waiting for Godot by Samuel Beckett, Tehran, Molavi Hall (2005)
- Two Latin American plays, Tehran, Department of Cinema & Theater (2006)
- Oleanna by David Mamet, Tehran, City Theater (2006)
- Anniversary Celebratory and Swan Song by Chekhov, Tehran, Department of Cinema & Theater (2007)
- Ohio Impromptu, Footfalls, Come and Go, Catastrophe, and Rough for Theater 1 by Samuel Beckett (Tehran, Molavi Hall, June 2008)
- All That Falls by Samuel Beckett, Artist home, Tehran, September 2008
- Police by Slawomir Merozek, first premier: May 2009
- Catastrophe & Come and Go by Samuel Beckett, Romania, 2009
- What Where / Mountain Language Beckett/Pinter, (2010)
- Magic Mountain, written and devised by Ali Akbar Alizad (2010), a collaboration between 84theater and 20 Stories High from Liverpool, performed in Manchester, UK, as a part of Contacting the World Festival
- Catastrophe and Come and Go by Samuel Beckett, UK, Manchester, 2010
- Endless Monologue, a documentary performance based on the verbatim technique. July 2011, East Gallery, Tehran
- Play by Samuel Beckett, Arasbaran Art Center, Tehran, November and September 2011.
- Krapp's Last Tape, by Samuel Beckett, Molavi Hall, 2012
- Tango, by Slawomir Merozek, (banned by Iranian Art censorship)
- The House of Bernarda Alba by Lorca, Tehran, 2014
- Act Without Words I & II by Samuel Beckett, Tehran, Moje No hall, 2014
- Oleanna by David Mamet, Tehran, Samandarian hall, 2015
- Mountain Language/Faith in Ourselves by Harold Pinter/Martin Crimp, Tehran, Molavi Hall, 2016
- Fragments by Samuel Beckett, Tehran, City Theater (2016)
- The Maids by Jean Genet, Tehran, Molavi Hall, (2018)
- Alice in Tehran, written and directed by Ali Akbar Alizad (in rehearsal)
