= Akbar Hossain (journalist) =

Bangladeshi journalist and diplomat

- আকবর হোসেন
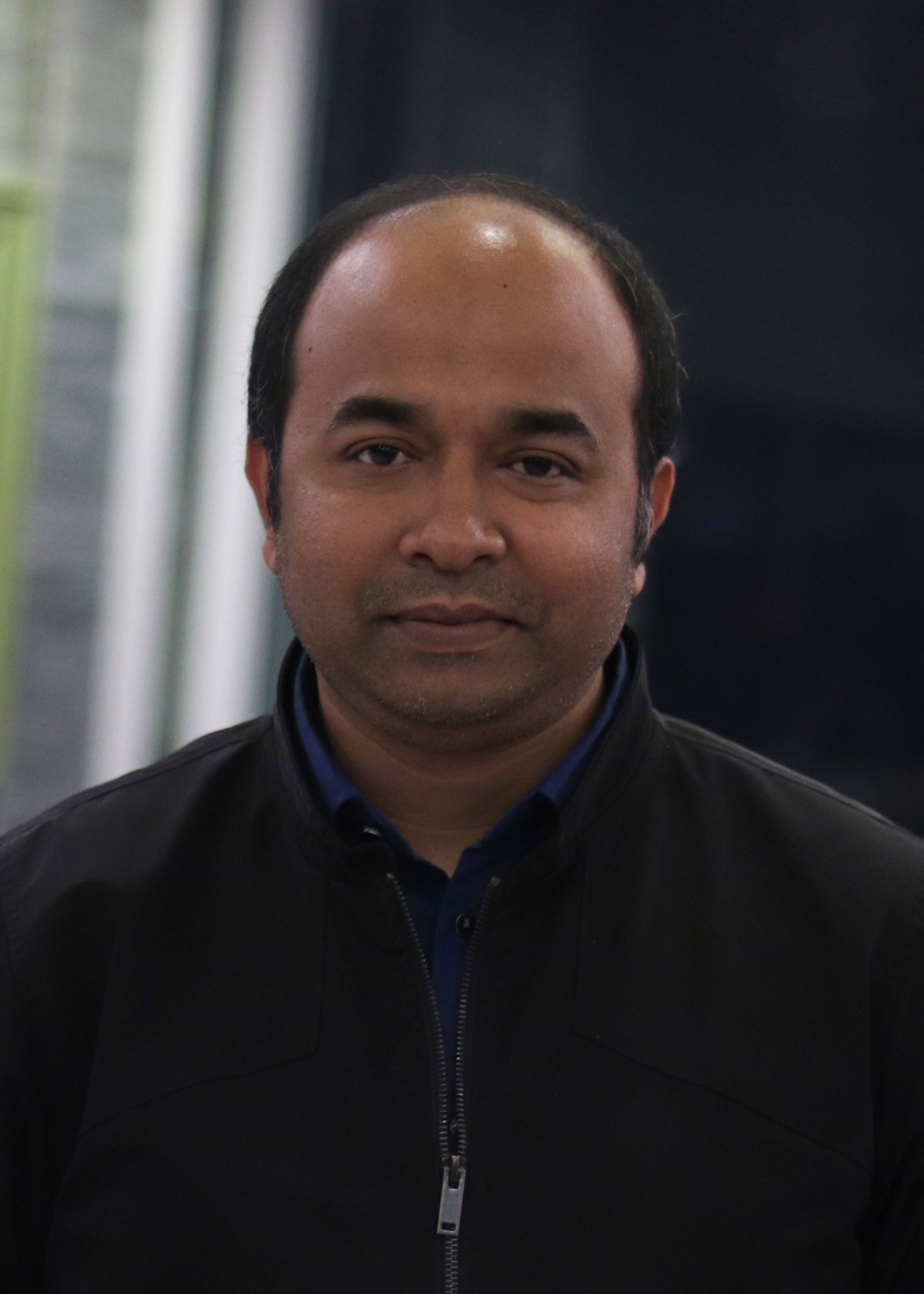

Press Minister at the Bangladesh High Commissions in London
- In office 24 November 2024 – 10 April 2026
- President: Mohammed Shahabuddin
- Prime Minister: Muhammad Yunus (Chief adviser); Tarique Rahman

Personal details
- Occupation: Journalist, Media Professional
- Known for: BBC journalist

Akbar Hossain is a Bangladeshi journalist and diplomat, currently serving as Press Minister at the Bangladesh High Commission in London, United Kingdom.

== Early life & education ==
Hossain graduated in journalism from University of Dhaka.

== Career ==
He began his professional journalism career by joining the English daily The Daily Star in June 2003. In October 2005, he moved to the Bengali‑language service of BBC World Service (BBC Bangla), where he went on to become a senior correspondent. In that capacity, he contributed to both Bengali and English services, reporting on national and international issues from Bangladesh.

=== Appointment as Press Minister in London ===
On 24 November 2024, the government of Bangladesh announced the appointment of Akbar Hossain as Press Minister at the Bangladesh High Commission in London. His appointment is on a contractual basis for two years and requires that he relinquish any other professional, business, or organizational affiliations. The decision was issued through notifications by the Ministry of Foreign Affairs and the Ministry of Public Administration.
