= Ramakrishnanagar =

Ramakrishna Nagar ರಾಮಕೃಷ್ಣನಗರ
- Interactive map of Ramakrishna Nagar
- Coordinates: 12.28348°N 76.61668°E
- Country: India
- State: Karnataka
- District: Mysore
- Postal code: 570022

Ramakrishna Nagar is a residential locality in southern Mysuru, Karnataka. The inner part of the area is called the Andolana Circle or the Andolana intersection. It borders Kuvempunagar and Vivekanandanagar.

== Image gallery ==
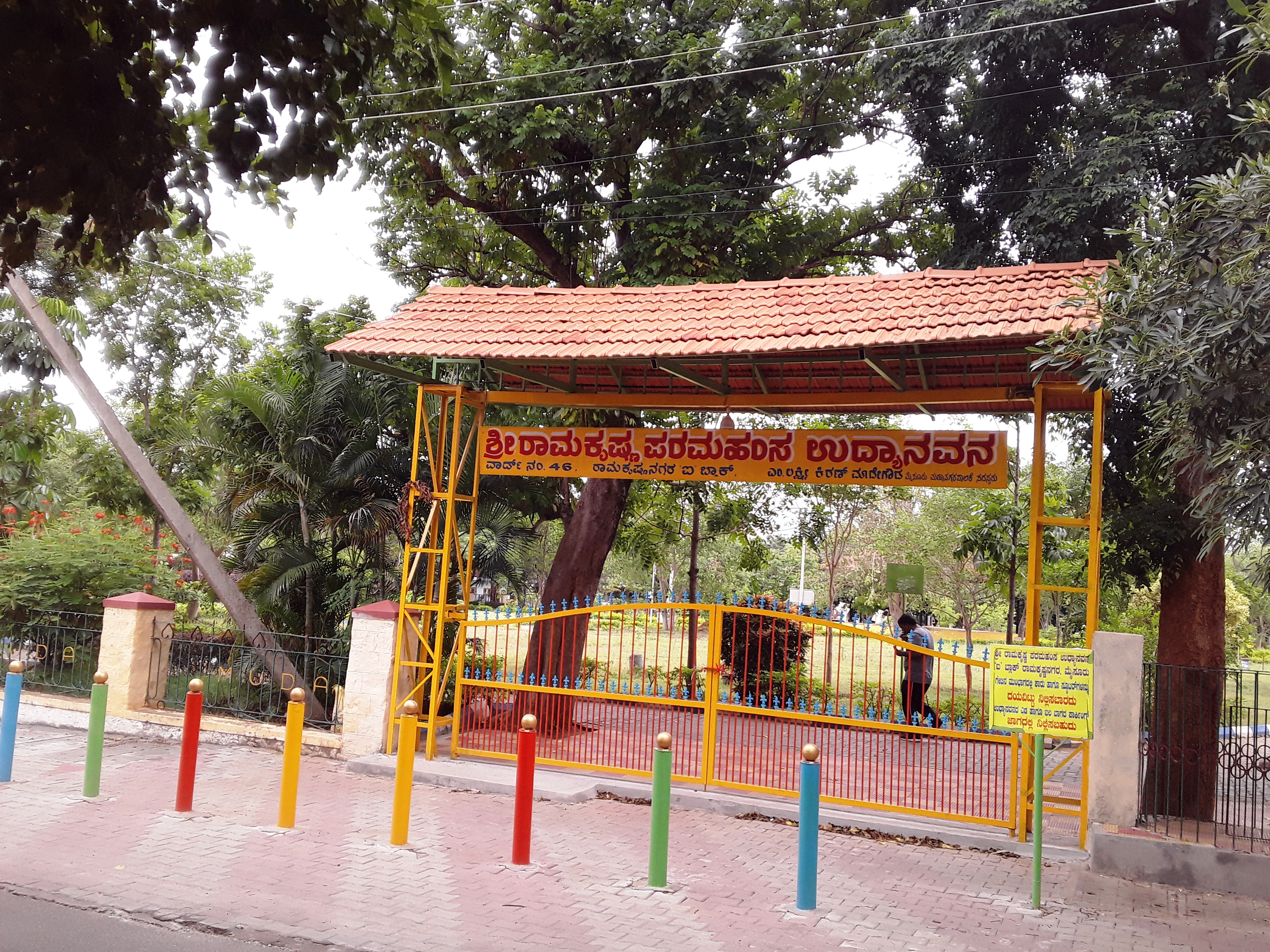
Andolan Junction Park

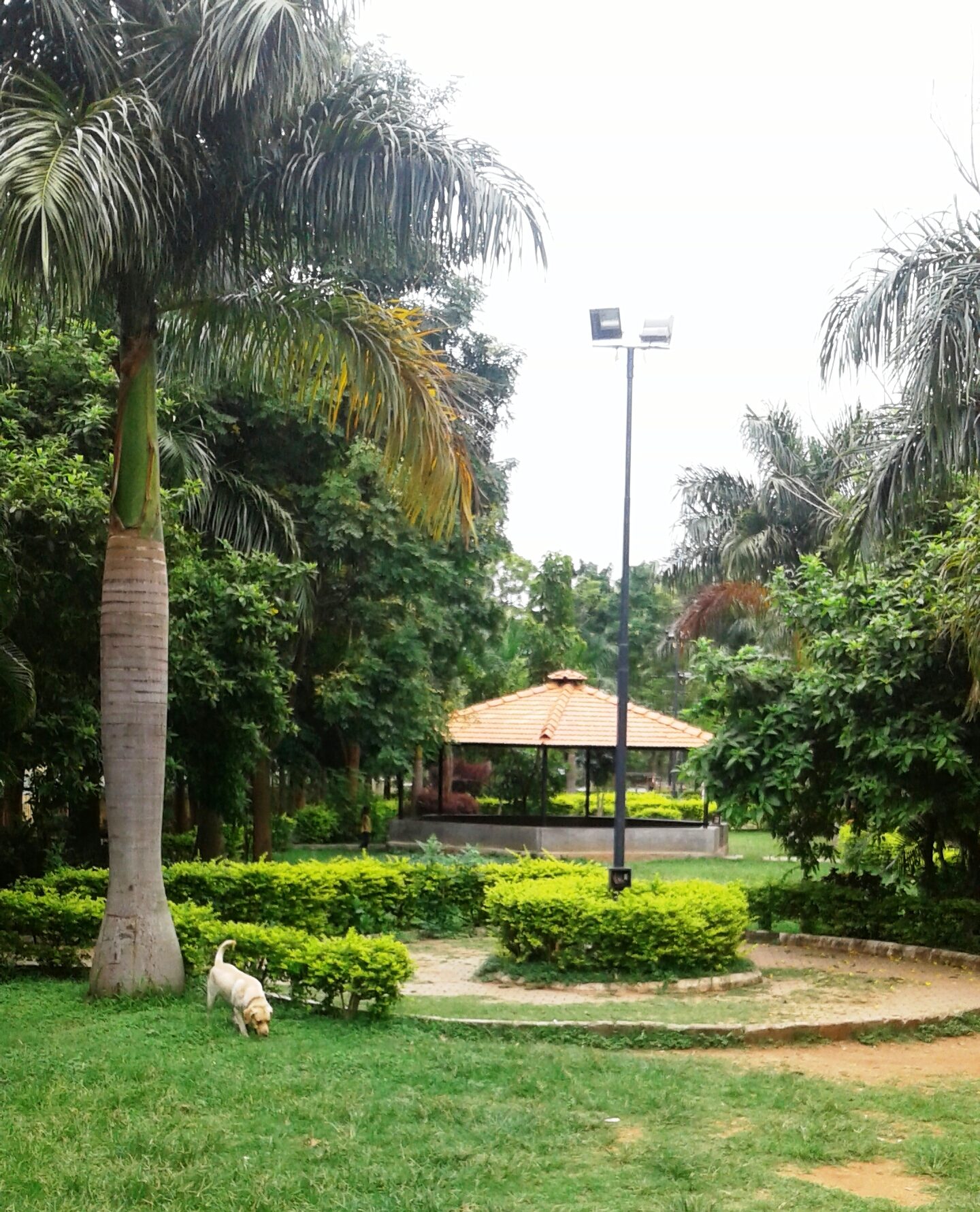
Yoga Park

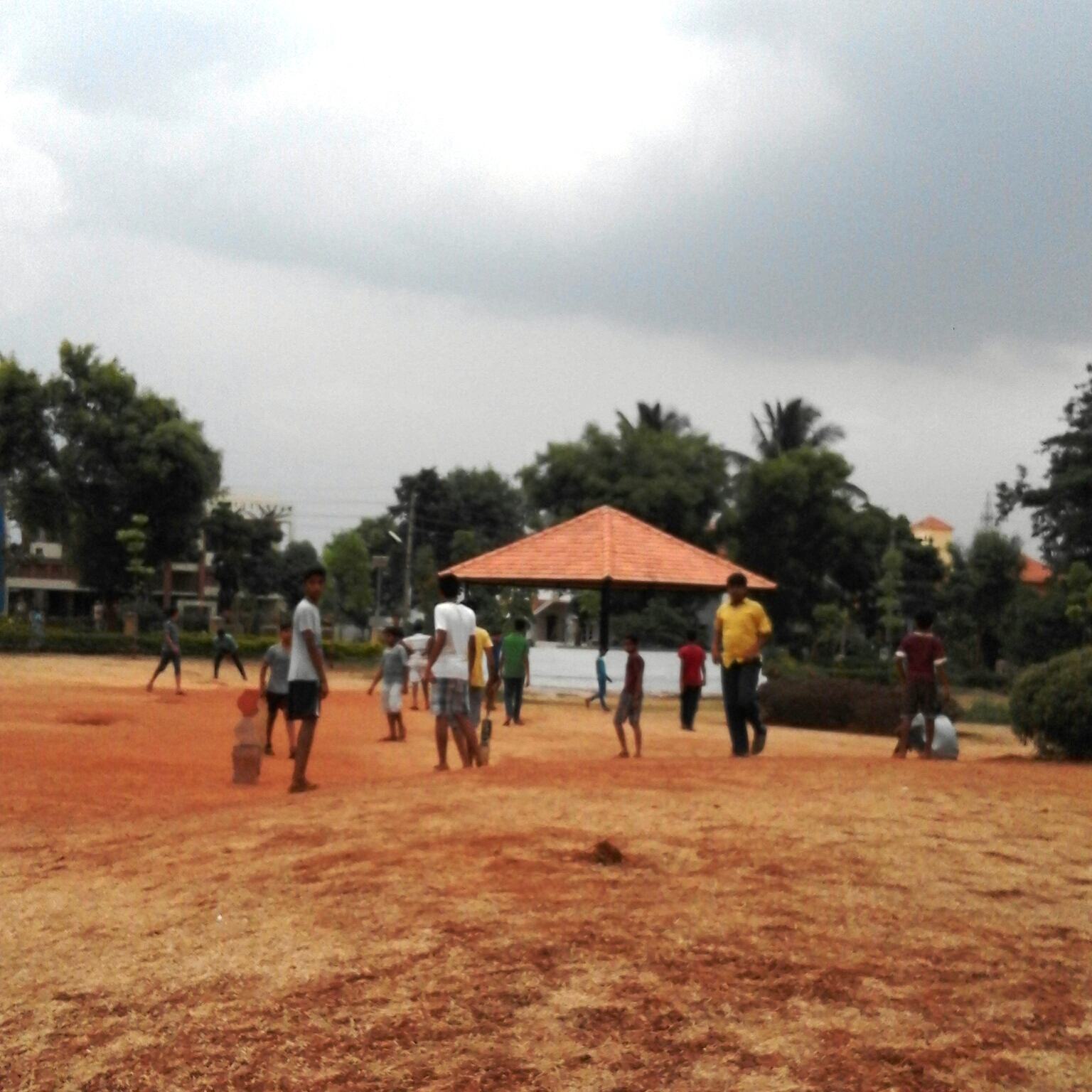
Paramahamsa Park, Andolan Circle

== See also ==
- Kuvempunagar
- Dattagalli
- Vivekananda Nagar
