= Lingambudhi Lake =

Lake in Mysore, India

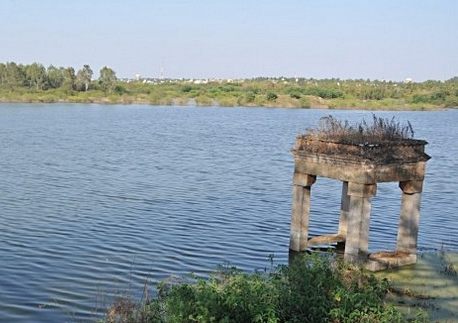
- Lingambudhi Lake

- Location within Karnataka
- Location: Mysore
- Coordinates: 12°16′9.74″N 76°36′43.12″E
- Basin countries: India

Lingambudhi Lake is a lake in the Indian city of Mysore.

== Botanical garden ==
A botanical garden was established on the lake's premises in 2020. It is divided into several sections, including the Arboretum Block, Rose Block, Argentea Block, Plumeria Block, Topiary Block, Fruits Block, Butterfly Park, Minor Fruit Block, Native Species Block, Palms Block, Medicinal and Aromatic Block, Rockeries Block, Lotus Pond, Bamboo Block, Ficus Block, and Endangered Species Block

== See also ==
- Lingam Budhi Park
