= Kuvempunagar =

- Interactive map of Kuvempunagar
- Coordinates: 12.282466177667125°N 76.62484541477387°E
- Country: India
- State: Karnataka
- City: Mysore South

Kuvempu Nagara is a residential layout located in the southern part of Mysore, Karnataka, India. Kuvempu nagara is one of the best localities to reside in. The asphalted roads are wide and witness moderate traffic. People can make optimal use of various modes of public transport available. It has parks, playgrounds and public arenas to host gatherings and get-togethers. The layout is well-planned and maintained by MUDA. It is surrounded by Jayanagara, Vivekananda Nagara, Ramakrishna Nagara and Saraswathipuram.

== See also ==
- Ramakrishna Nagara
- Akshaya Bhandar
- Mananthavady Road
- Srirampura
- Mysore South
- Raghavendra Nagar
- Kalyanagiri
