= Nanju Malige =

Market in the city of Mysore

Coordinates: 12.291782°N 76.647872°E

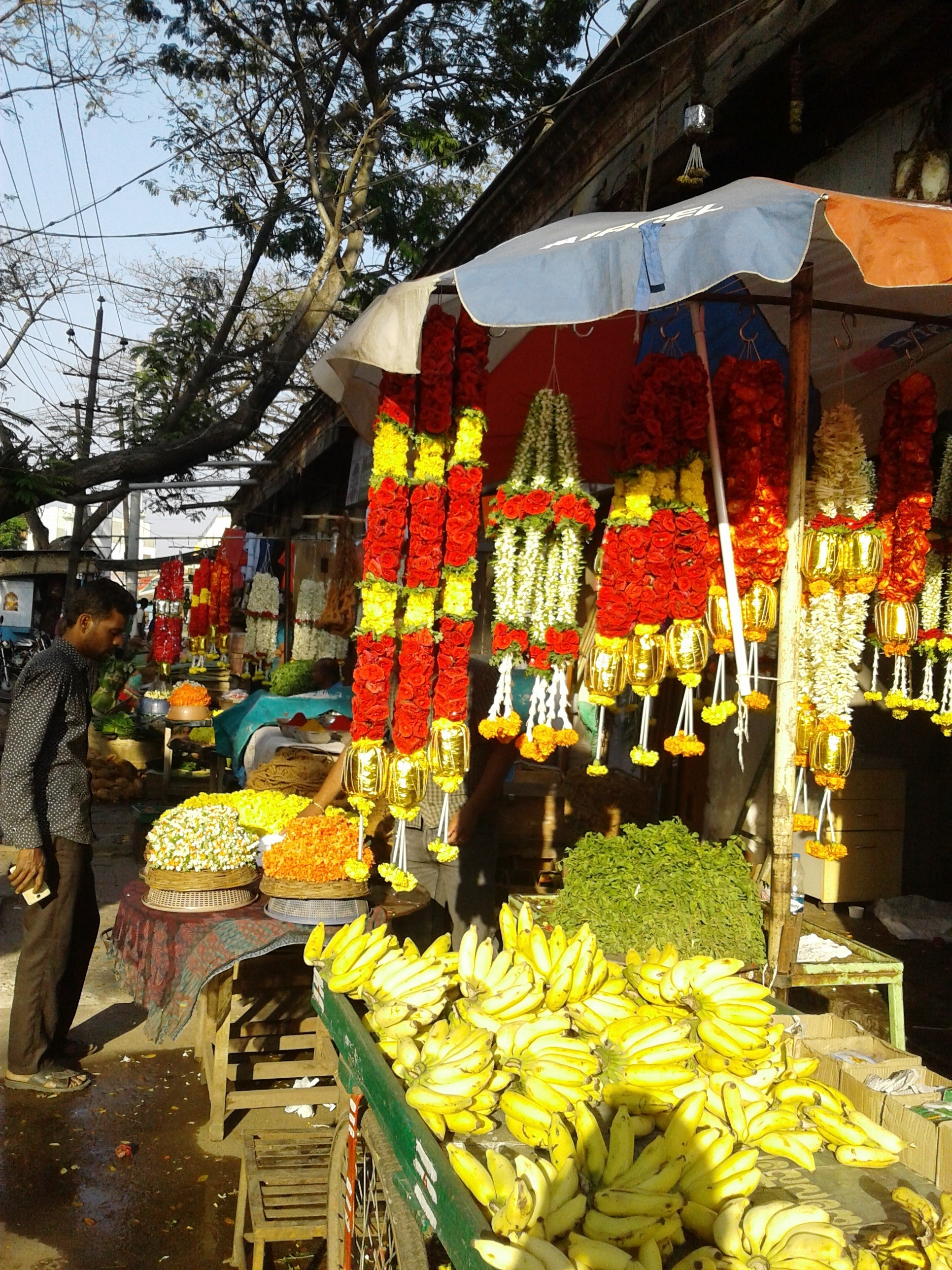
Flower Market

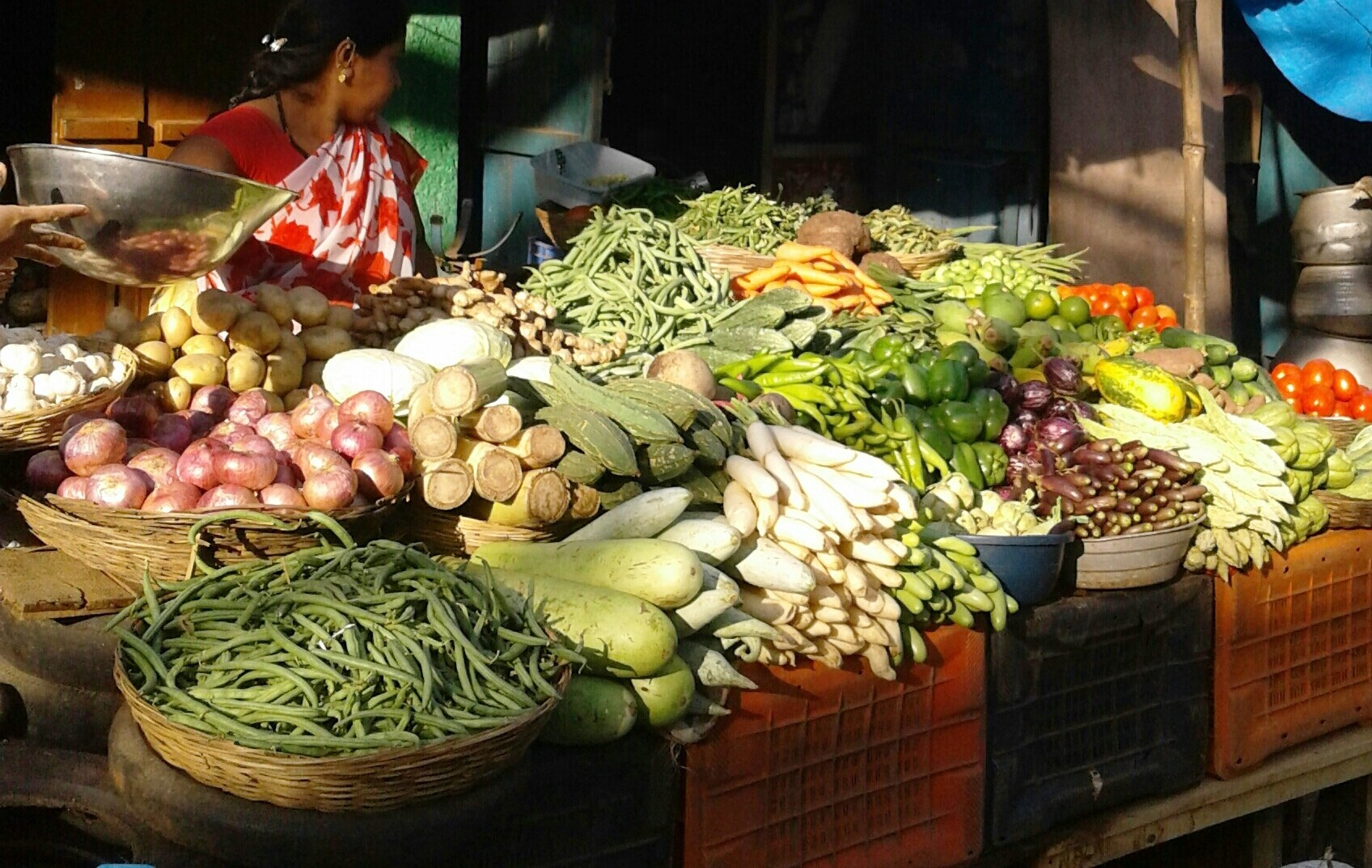
Vegetable Market

Nanju Malige is a market on the southern side of Mysore city in Karnataka state, India.

== Location ==
Nanju Malige Market is located in Lakshmipura area of Mysore city. Nanju Malige is located very close to Chamundipuram

== Post Office ==
There is a post office at Nanju Malige and the PIN code is 570004.

== Economy ==
Nanju Malige is one of the biggest market of flowers, fruits and vegetables in Mysore. Cane goods are also popular here. There are many banks and commercial establishments in this area.

== Education ==
Gopalaswamy Shishuvihara group of institutions is the biggest educational organization in this area.

== Image gallery ==
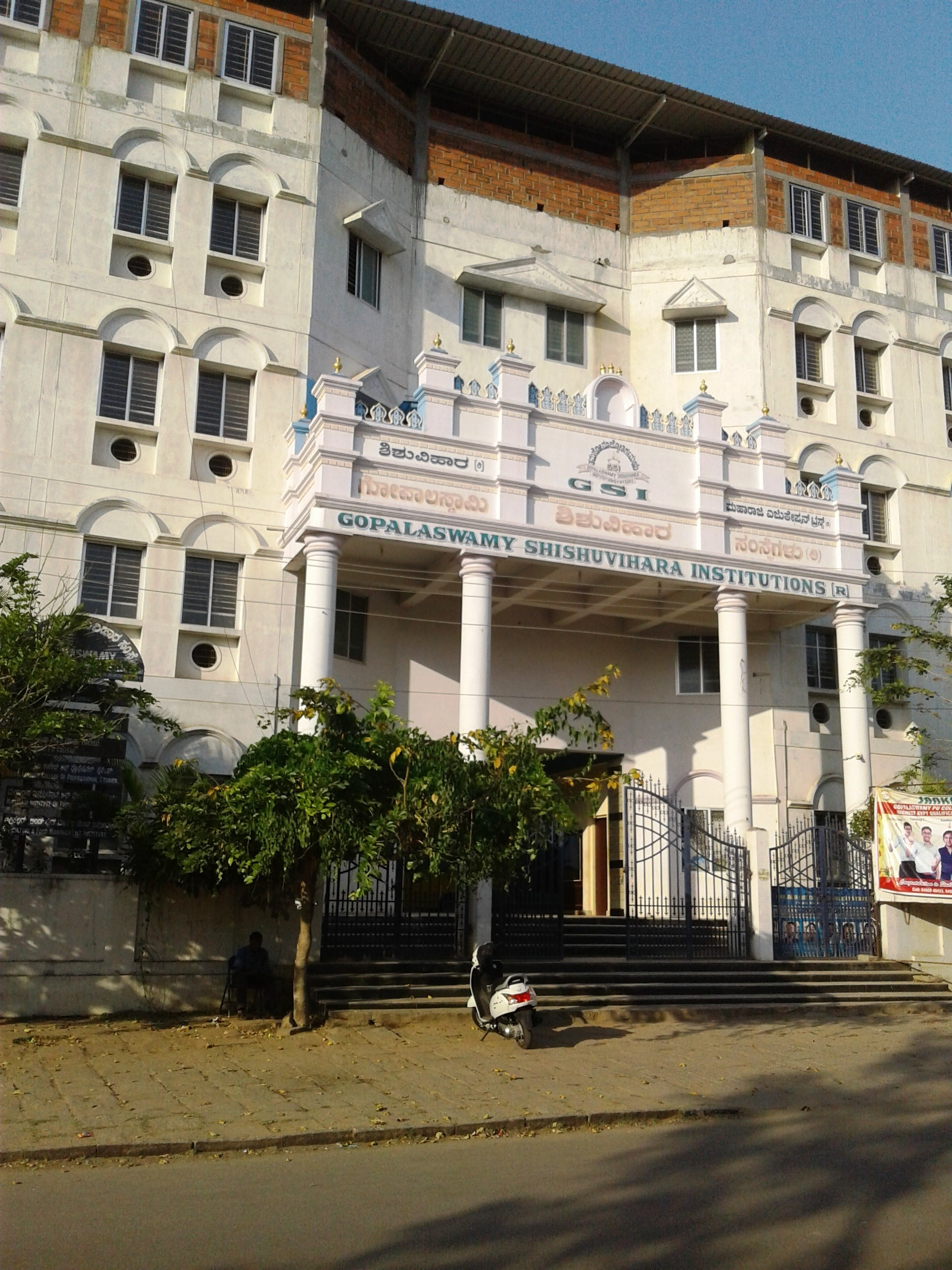
Gopalaswamy College

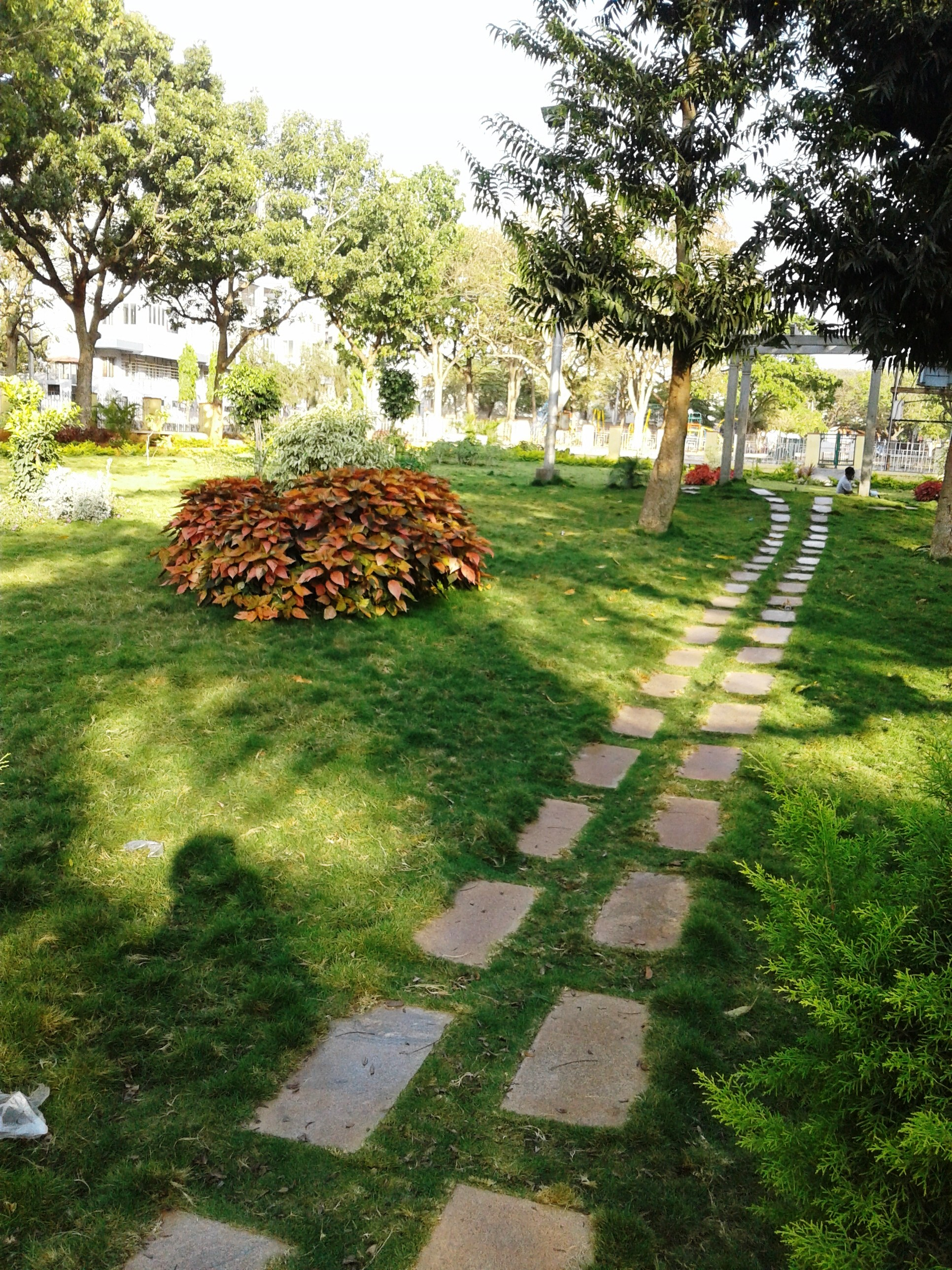
Double Park

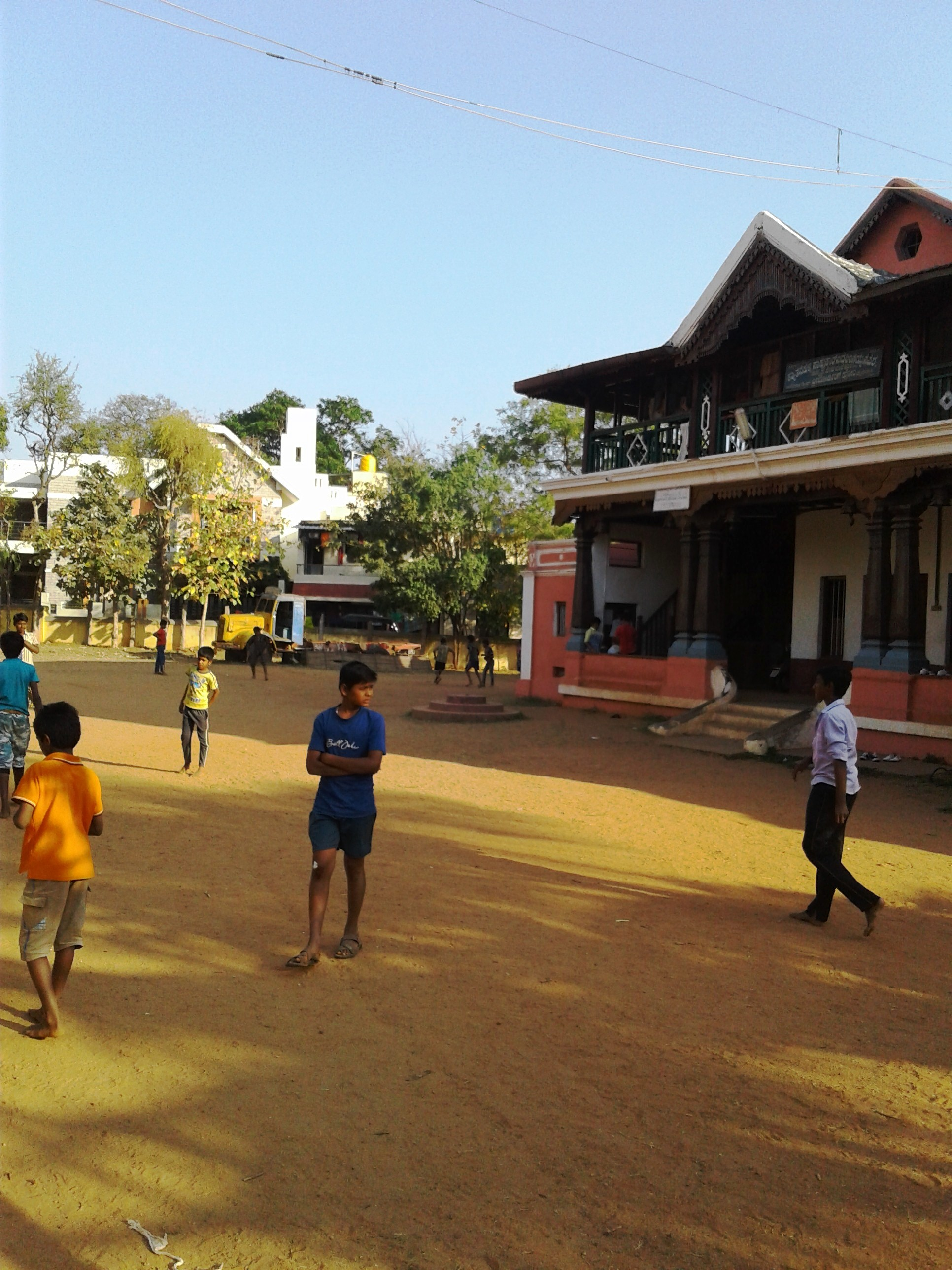
JSS Hostel

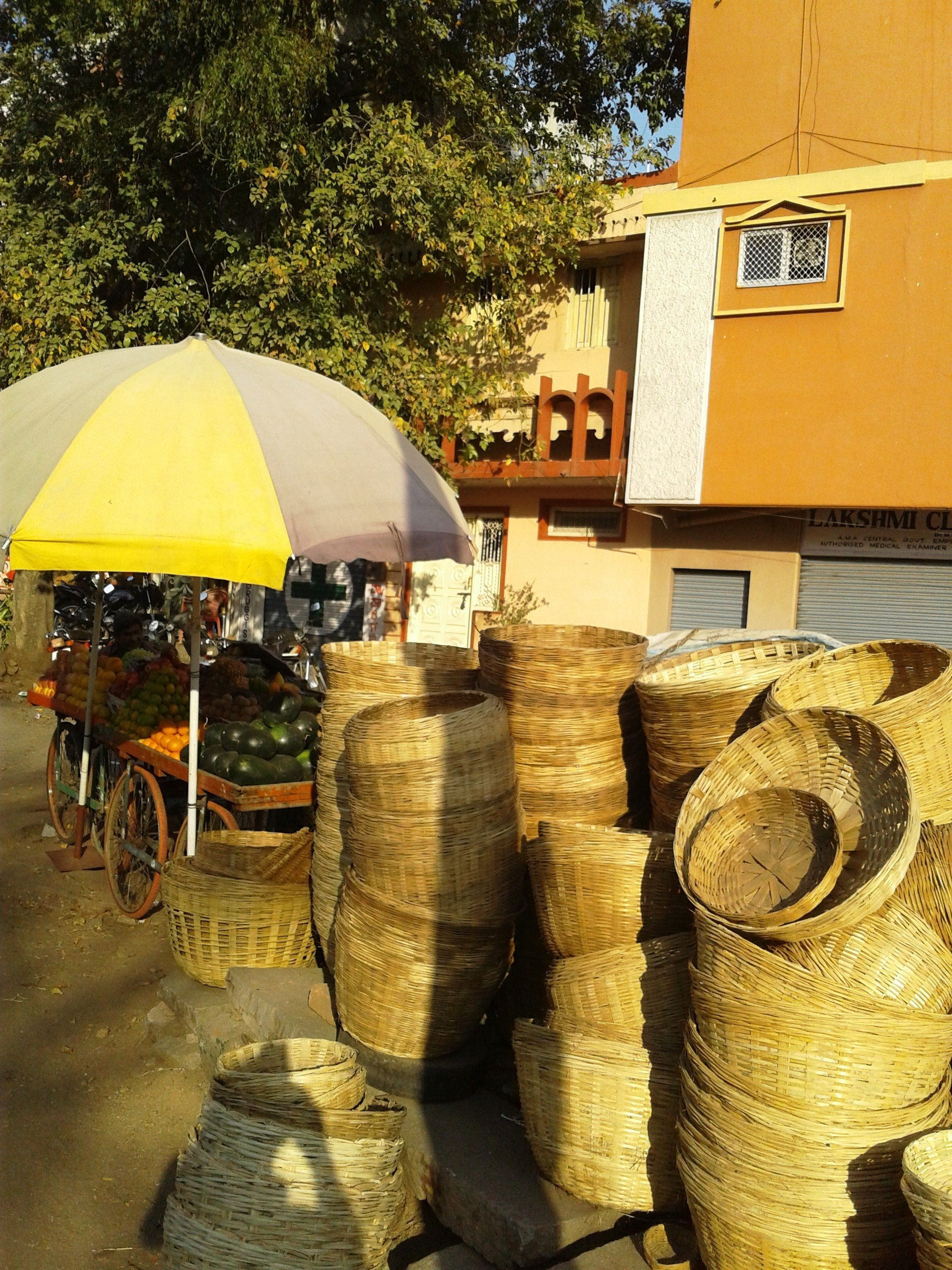
Cane Market

== See also ==
- Mysore South
- Gurur
- Vidyaranyapuram
- Jayaprakash Nagar Mysore
- Ashokapuram, Mysore
- Mananthavady Road
