= Mysore South =

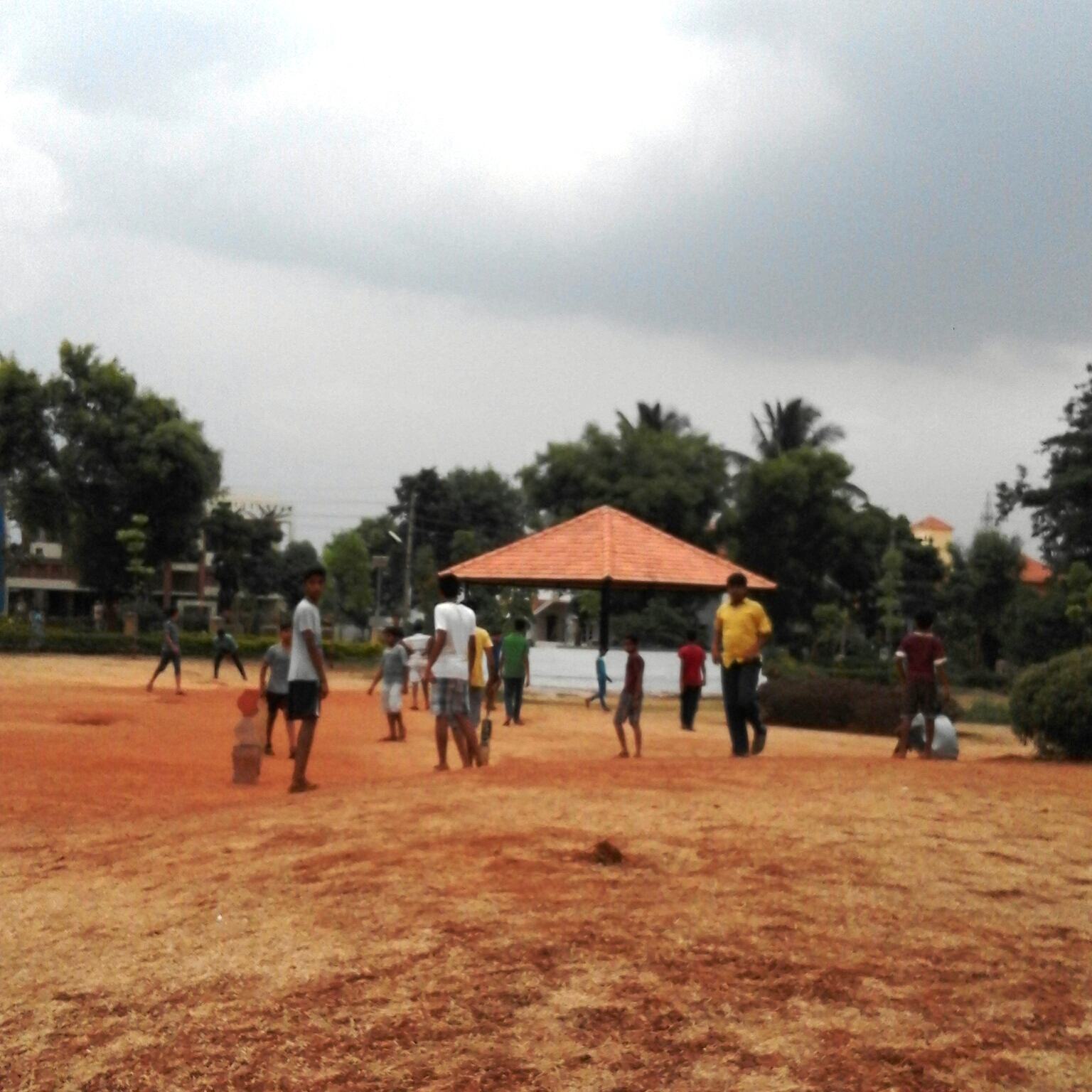
- Andolan Circle park, Ramakrishna Nagar
- Interactive map of Mysore South
- Coordinates: 12.26193°N 76.64221°E
- Country: India
- State: Karnataka
- District: Mysuru
- Time zone: UTC+5:30 (IST)

Mysore South or South Mysore is a cluster of suburbs lying on the southern side of Mysore city in Karnataka province in India.

== Post office ==
The Mysore South post office is located at J.P.Nagar and the postal code is 570008 Mysore south has a police station

== Constituent suburbs ==
Mysore south comprises the following suburbs of Mysore:

1. Mysore Airport road
2. Kuvempu Nagar
3. J.P.Nagar
4. Ramakrishna Nagar
5. Mananthavady Road
6. Ooty Road
7. Srirampur
8. Ashokapuram
9. Chamarajapuram
10. Ashokapuram, Mysore

== Economy ==
Some parts of southern Mysore are entirely residential. Ramakrishna Nagar, Srirampur and Kuvempu Nagar are examples for this. Some other parts are heavily industrialised and accommodate a large number of industrial workers. J.P.Nagar and Ashokapuram are examples for this type of area.

== Transportation ==
There are two railway stations in south Mysore: Chamarajapuram railway station and Ashokapuram railway station

== Landmarks ==
- Lingam Budhi Lake
- Central Railway workshop
- Sewage Farm
- Mysore Airport

== Gallery ==
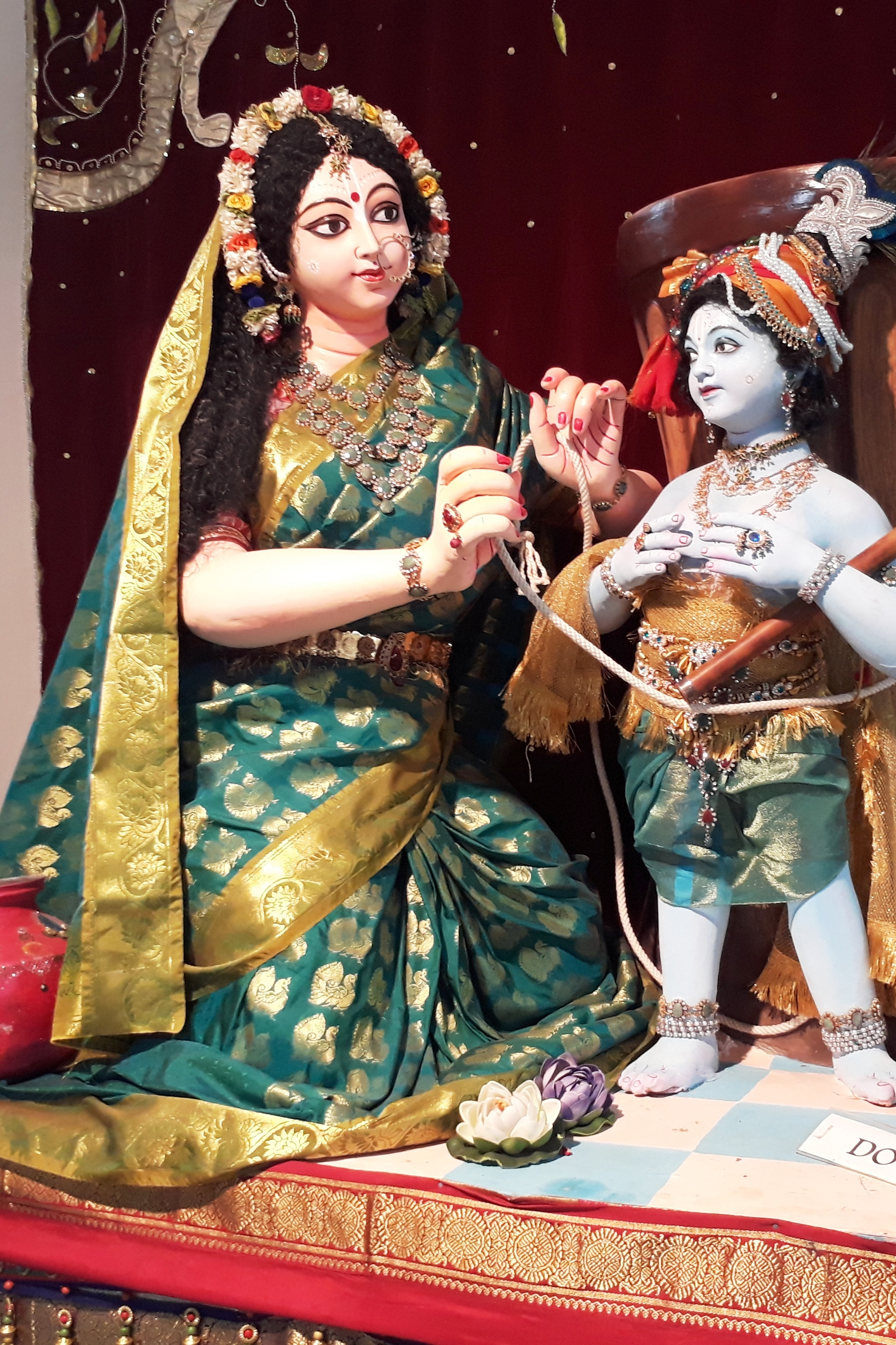
Hare Krishna temple, Mysore

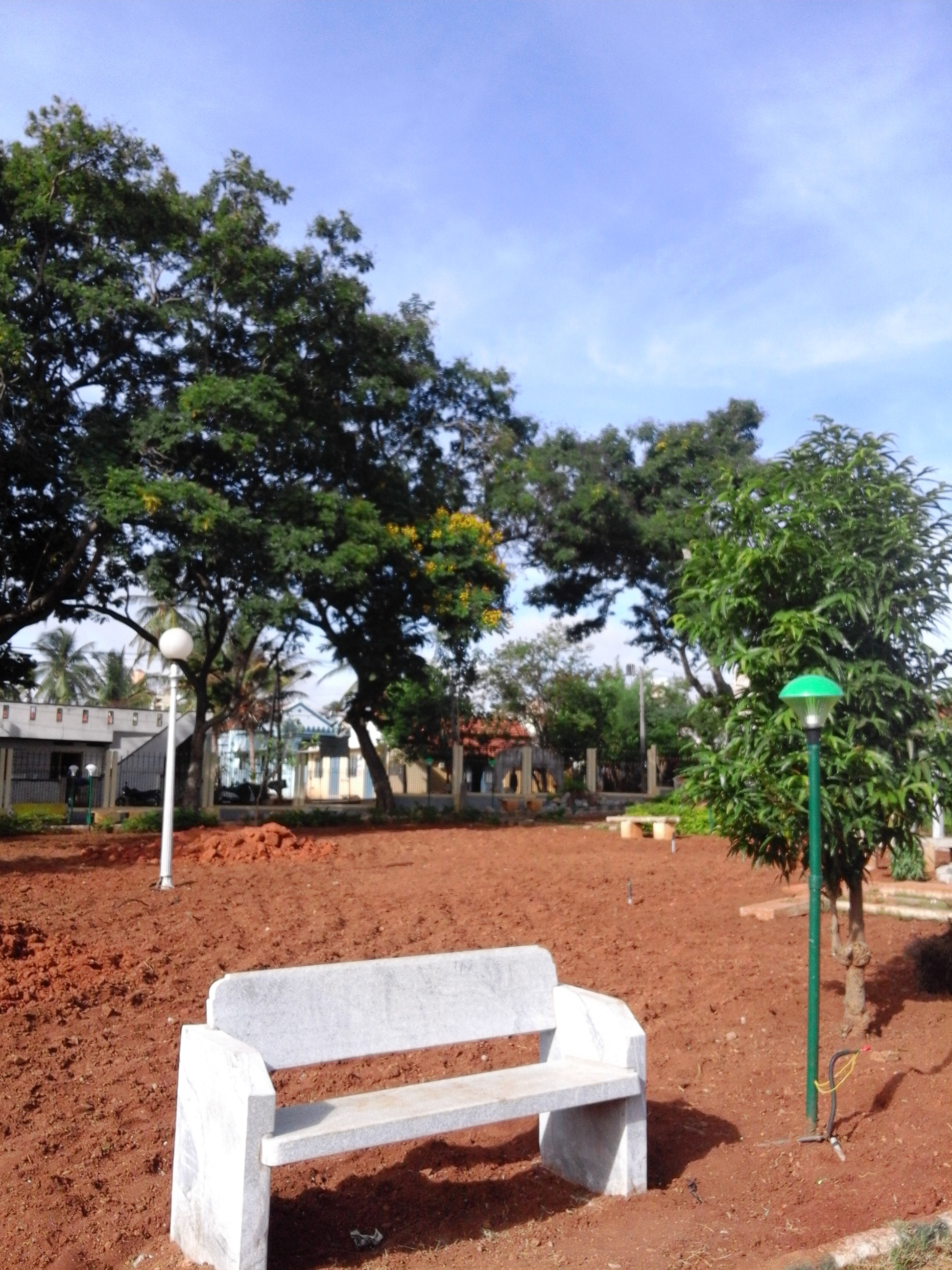
Ambedhkar Park, Ashokapuram

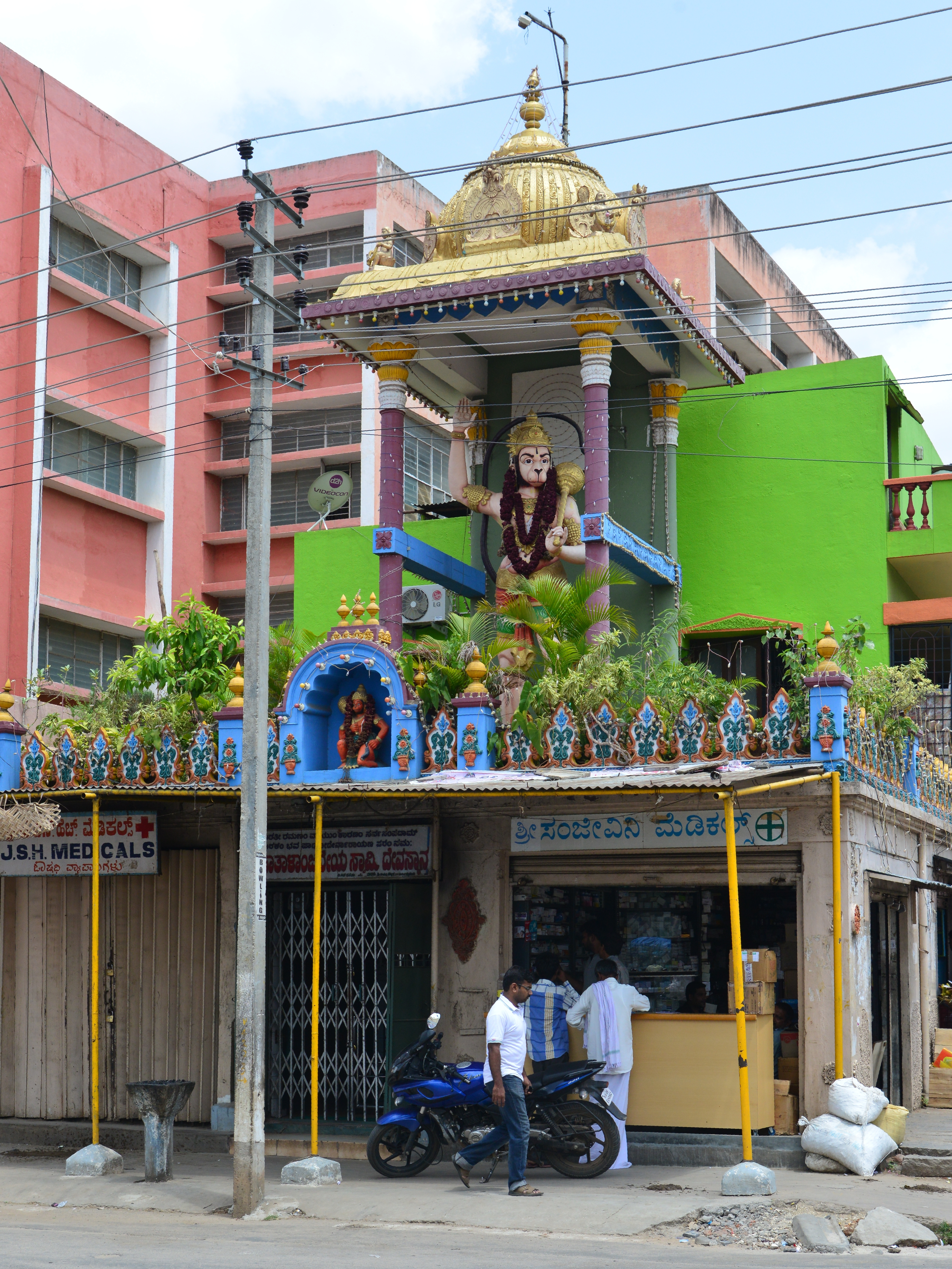
Patala Anjaneya Swamy Temple

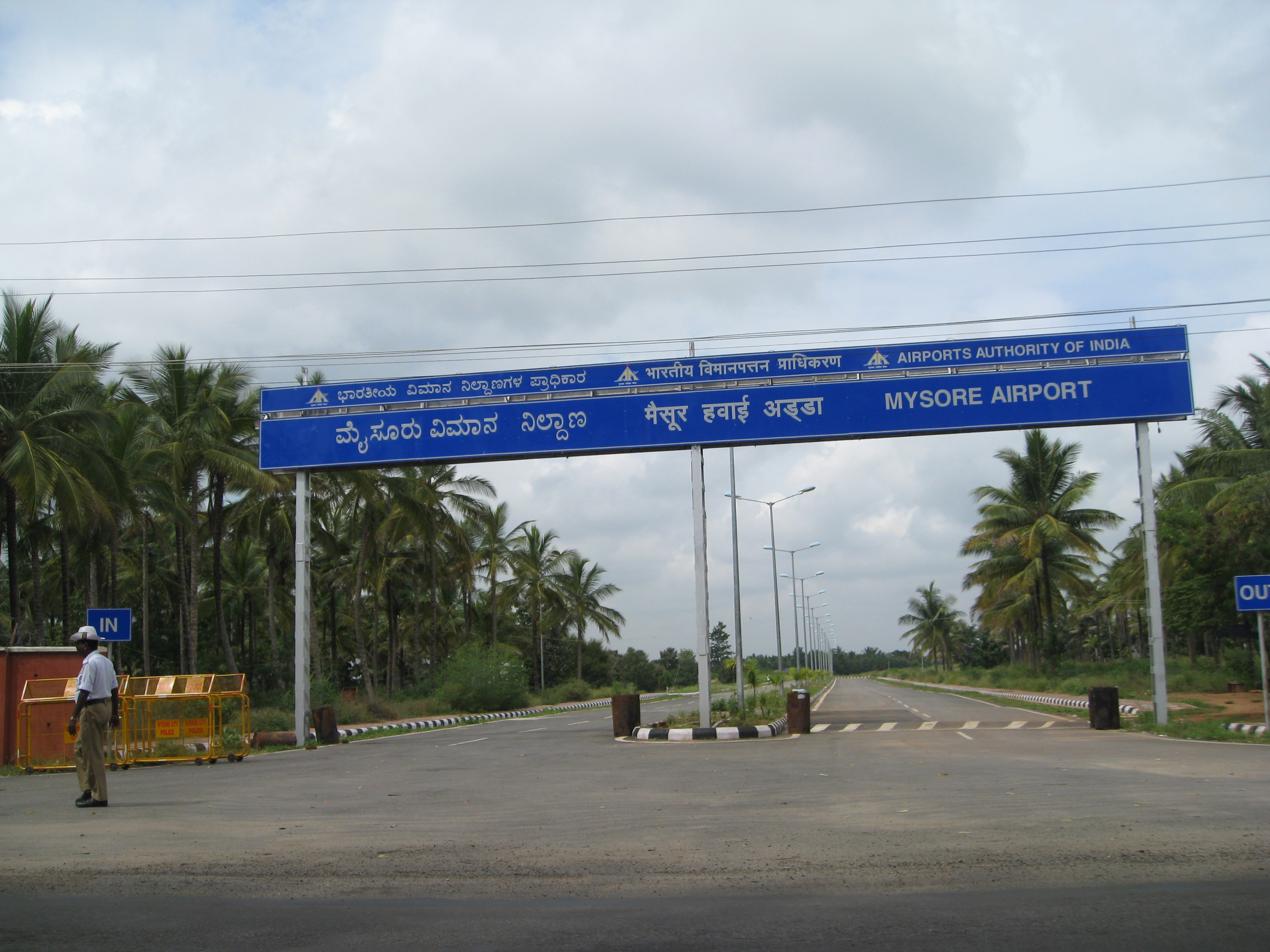
Mysore Airport

== See also ==
- Kuvempu Nagar
- Jayaprakash Nagar Mysore
- Manantahavady Road
- Srirampur
- Chamarajapuram
- Vidyaranyapura, Mysore
- Ashokapuram, Mysore
