= Jayaprakash Nagar, Mysore =

- Interactive map of Jayaprakash Nagar, Mysore
- Coordinates: 12.26075°N 76.64715°E
- Country: India
- State: Karnataka

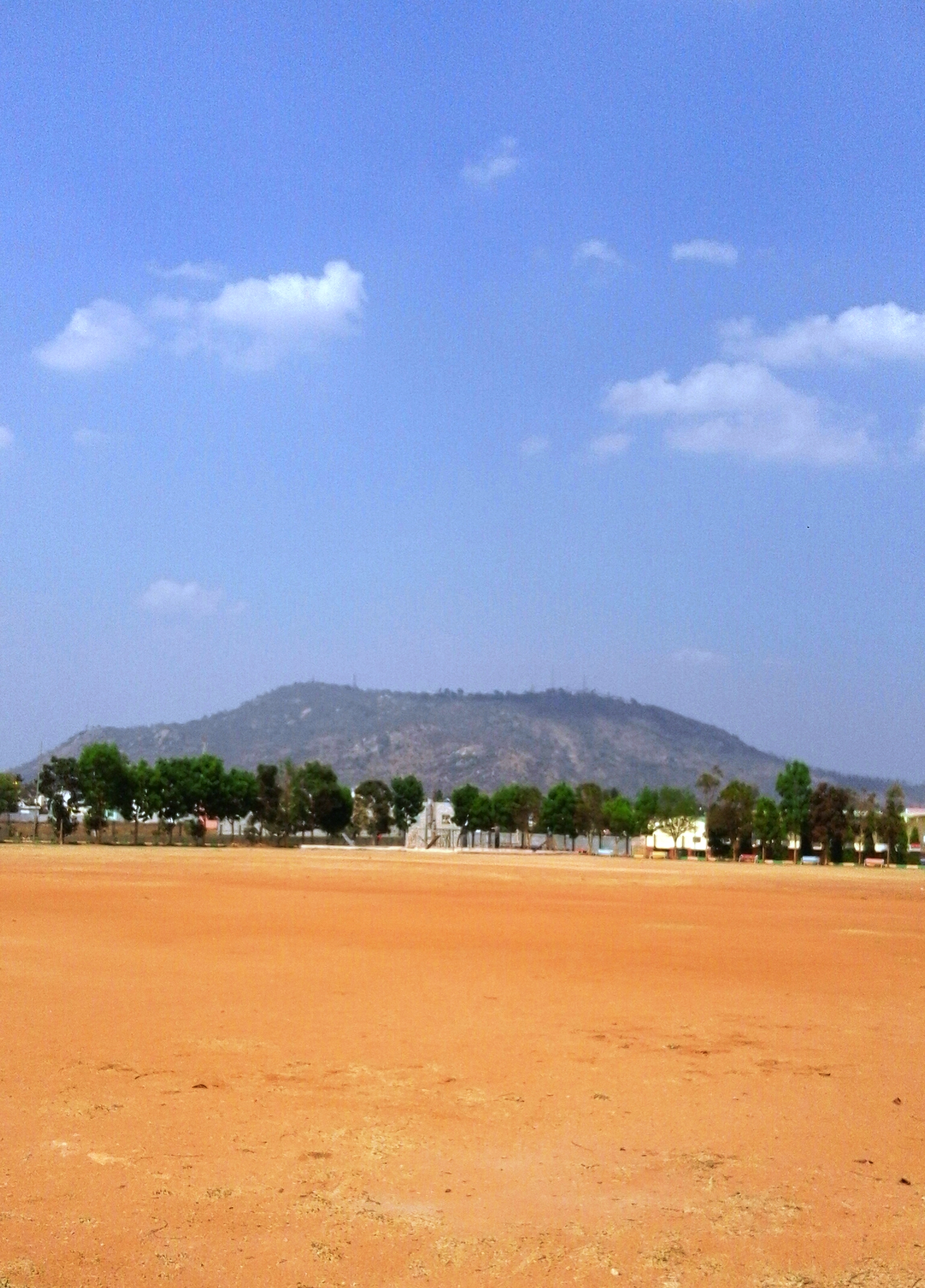
Chamundi Hill view from J.P.Nagar stadium

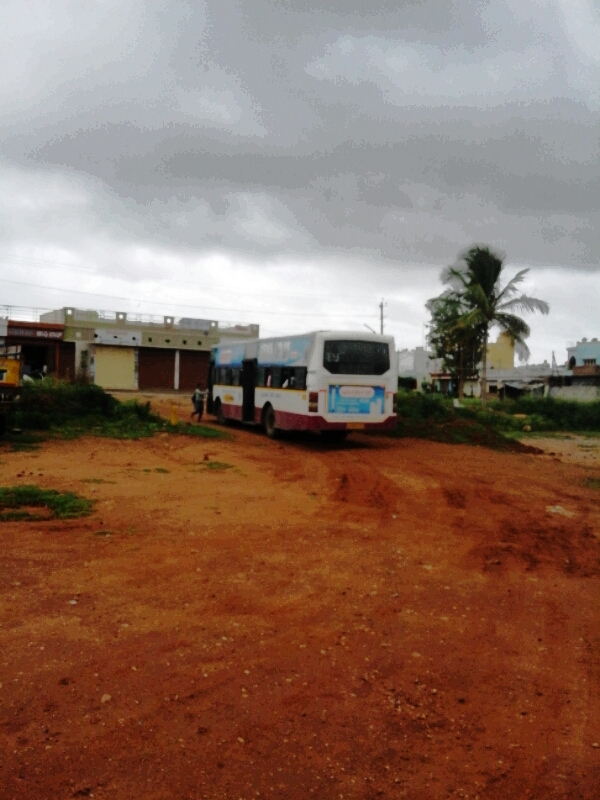
Rama Bhai village on Gorur Road

Jayaprakash Narayan Nagar, popularly known as J. P. Nagar, is one of the residential layouts in Mysore, under Krishnaraja Constituency, that is very adjacent to the outer ring road. J.P. Nagar was originally meant to be an industrial layout. But recently it has become an important residential area with many shops and establishments catering to the residents.

== J. P. Nagar Library and Stadium ==
The J. P. Nagar Library near to police booth has an extensive collection of English and Kannada books. It has got a very spacious reading space with special facilities for the child reader. There is a yoga center on the first floor of the library. A special niche park called Sri Puttaraj Gawai Stadium is attached to the library and there is a 500-meter walking track, a tennis court and an open-air auditorium adjacent to the library. There are facilities for playing cricket, handball, basketball, table tennis, Tennis -clay and football. The swimming pool was built by Build-Operate-Transfer scheme and it has a short course of eight lines. There is another indoor pool of three lines. A gymnasium and a skating ring are also included in the facility.

== Speciality parks ==
The stadium also has two speciality parks on either side of the library building. One is a children's park with all playing facilities. Another is a niche park for couples and philosophers with a lot of privacy included.

== Areas nearer to J. P. Nagar ==
- Chamundipuram, Vishweshwara Nagar and Shanidevara temple
- Vidyaranyapura and Goblimara
- Policebooth and Kavitha bakery
- JP Nagar last bus stop
- Nanchana Halli Palaya
- JP Nagar sports club
- Navodaya layout

== See also ==
- Mysore South
- Gurur
- Vidyaranyapura, Mysore
- Ashokapuram, Mysore
- Nanju Mallige
- Mananthavady Road
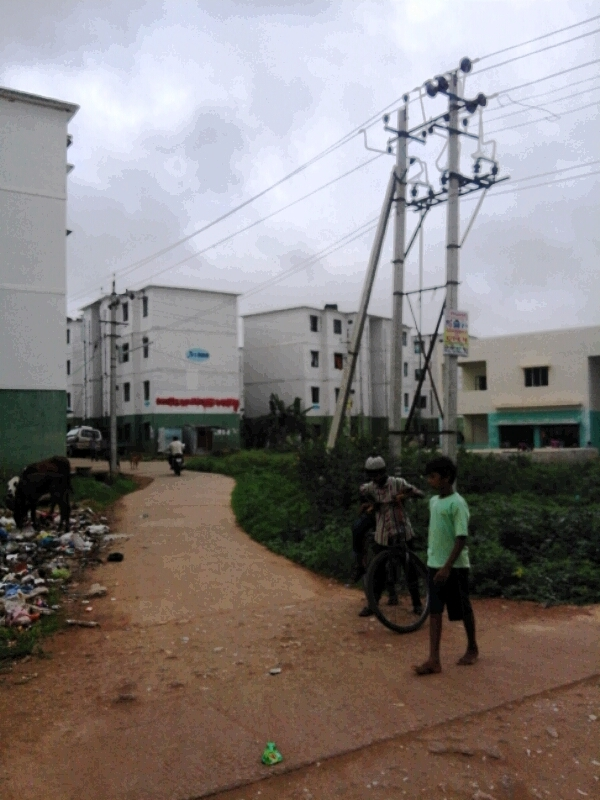
Housing for the poor at Gurur road

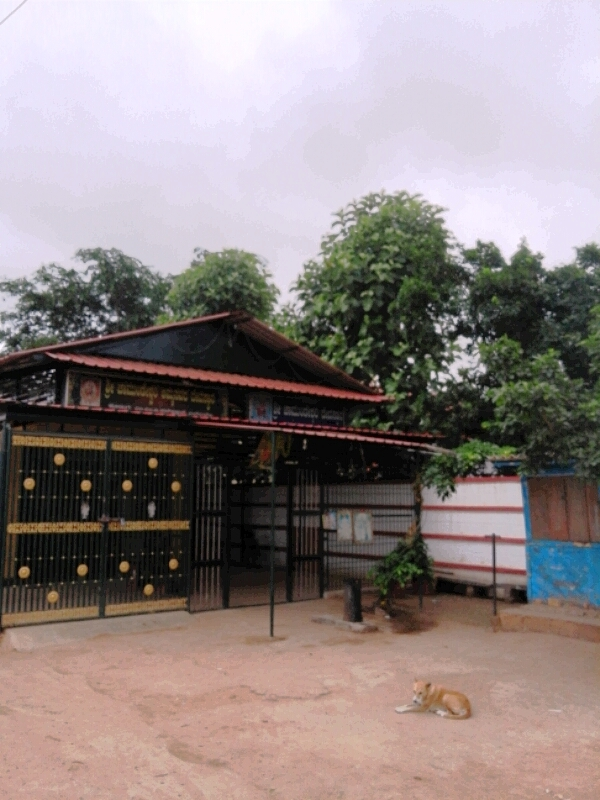
Temple on Gurur road

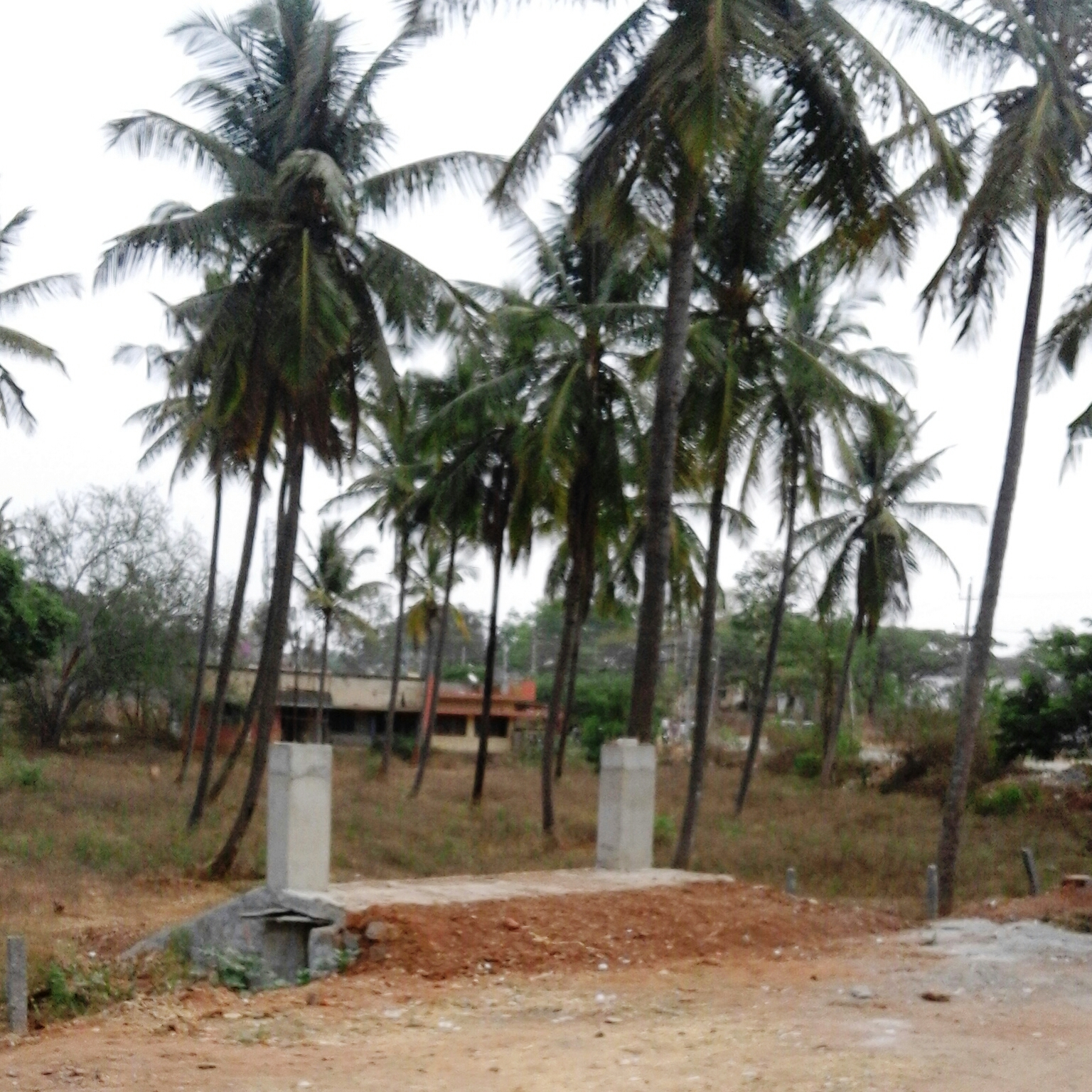
N.H.Palaya

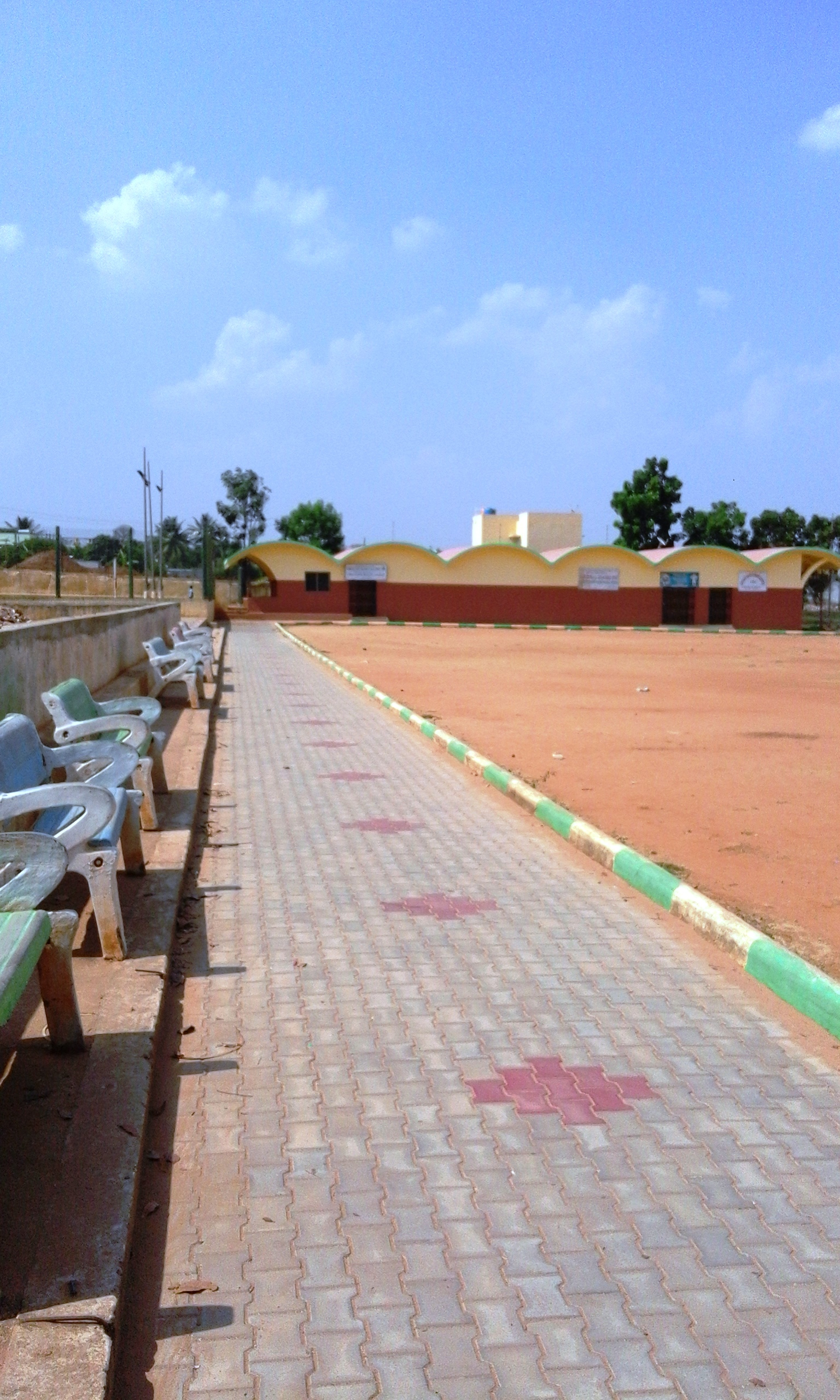
J.P.Park
