= Chamundipuram =

Suburb of Mysore city in Karnataka state, India

Coordinates: 12.288829971844716°N 76.65040689259389°E

Chamundipura is a suburb of Mysore city in Karnataka state, India.

== Etymology ==
The locality is named after Goddess Chamundi located atop Chamundi Hill.

== Location ==
Located between Vidyaranyapuram, Nanju Malige, Chamundi Hills, Chamundipuram is one of the old planned localities in Mysore City. Narayana Shastry Road, Ramanuja Road, Jhansi Laxmi Bai Road are the prominent roads in the area
