= Ashokapuram, Mysore =

Suburb in Mysore, Karnataka

- Ashokapuram, Mysuru
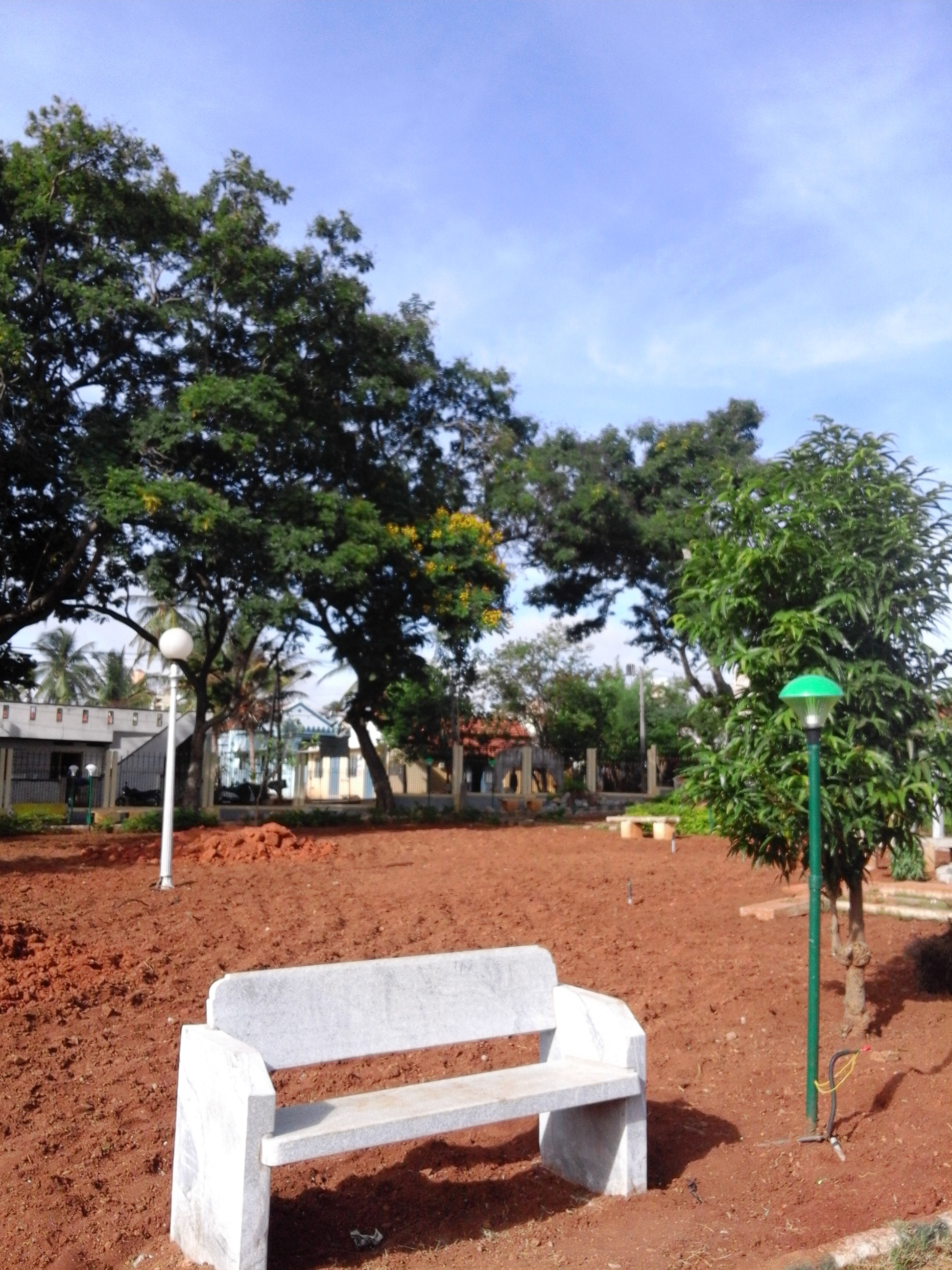
- Nickname: Puram
- Interactive map of Ashokapuram, Mysore
- Coordinates: 12.27459°N 76.63779°E
- Country: India
- State: Karnataka
- District: Mysore
- Time zone: UTC+5:30 (IST)
- PIN: 570008
- Telephone code: 0821
- Vehicle registration: 09

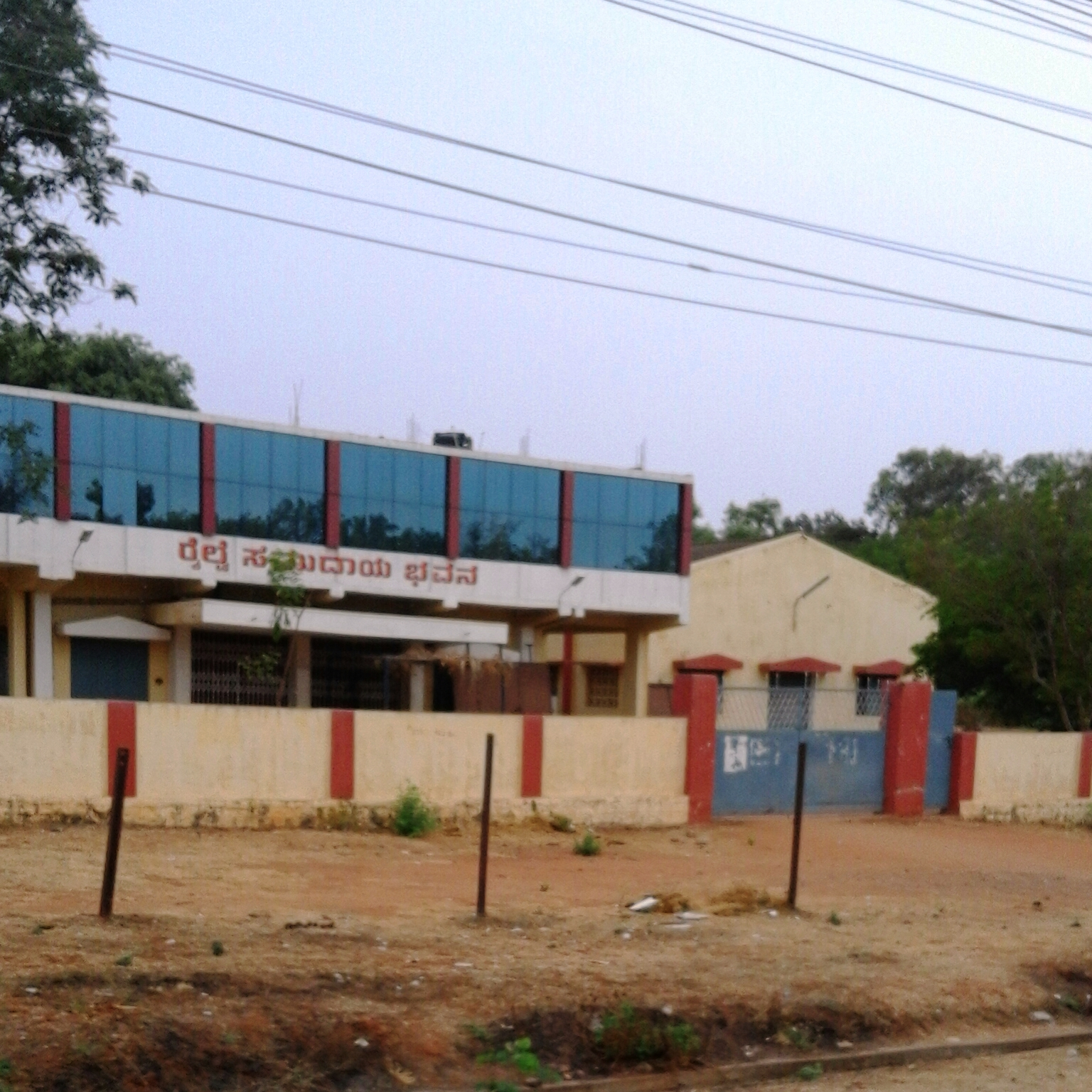
Central Railway Workshop, Ashokapuram

Ashokapuram is a suburb of Mysore coming on the southern side of the city. It is part of Mysore district in Karnataka state of India.

== Landmarks ==
- Dr. Ambedkar Park, Ashokapuram
- Central Railway Workshop, Ashokapuram
- Ashokapuram Police Station
- Sandalwood Factory, Ashokapuram
- Hare Krishna temple (ISKCON)
- Mysore South Post Office
- Aranya Bhawan Forest Office

== Transportation ==
From the Mysore city bus stand to Ashoka puram buses are available. Ashoka Clinic or Ashokapuram bus stop or Jayanagar Railway Gate stop.

Nearby bus stops at Ashoka Circle (ballal).

Ashokapuram Railway Station has slow trains to Chamaraja Nagar and Mysore. The nearest major station is Mysore Junction railway station.

== Education ==
- National Institute of Engineering
- Maharishi School
- Pramati Hillview Academy
- NIE Science College
- St. Thomas School
- St. Rita School
- Sarada Vilas Educational Institutions
- Government Schools

== Suburbs ==
Devayyanahundi is the suburb of Ashokapuram on the southern side. Srirampura watertank connects Ashokapuram to Kuvempu Nagar area. Bus No.60 touches Ashokapuram, Jayanagara Chamarajapuram and Watertank localities.

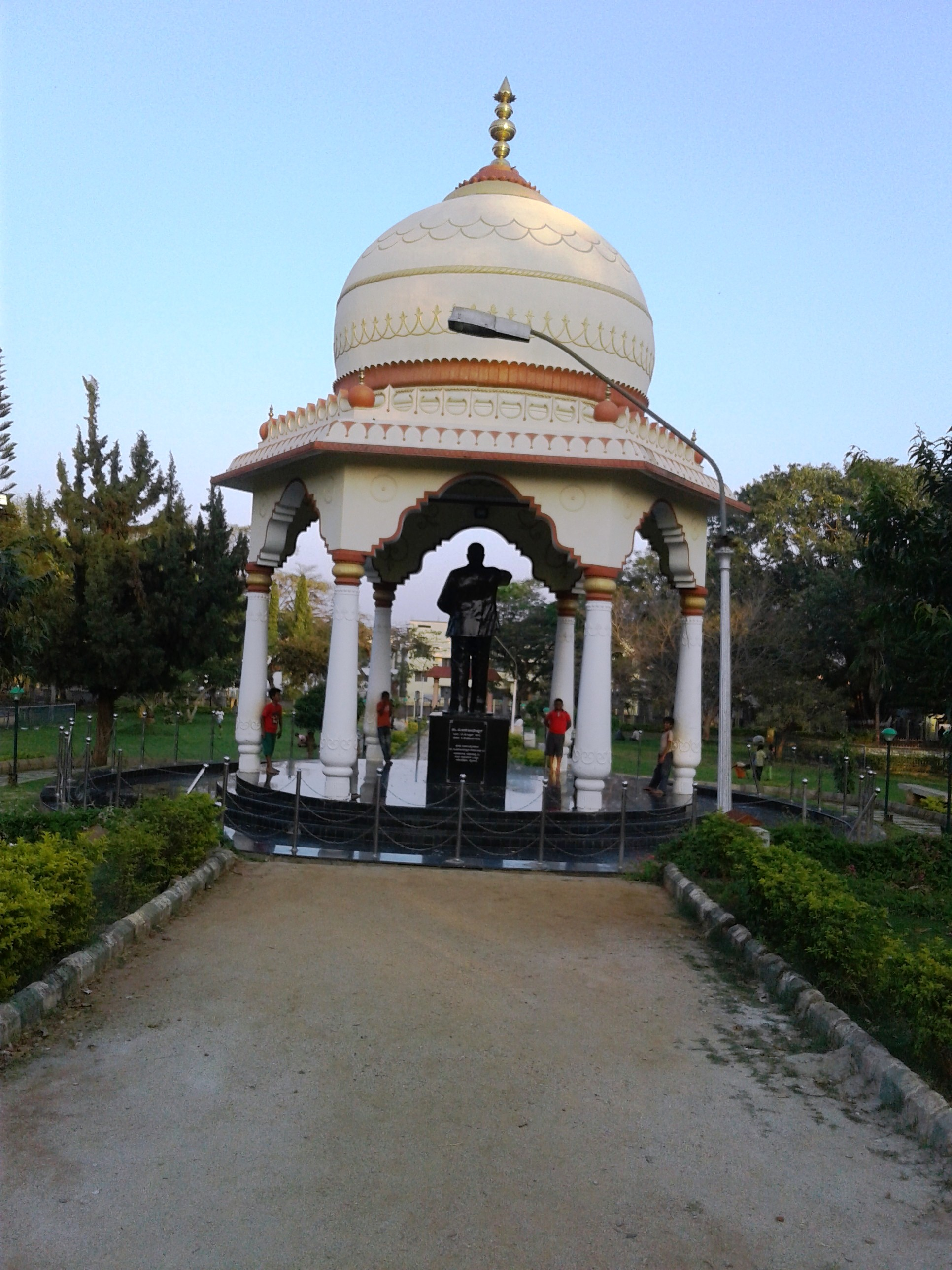
Ambedkar Park

== See also ==
- Chamarajapuram
- Mysore South
- Gurur
- Vidyaranyapura, Mysore
- Jayaprakash Nagar Mysore
- Nanju Mallige
- Mananthavady Road
