= Vidyaranyapuram =

Suburb of Mysore, India

Coordinates: 12.27568°N 76.64543°E

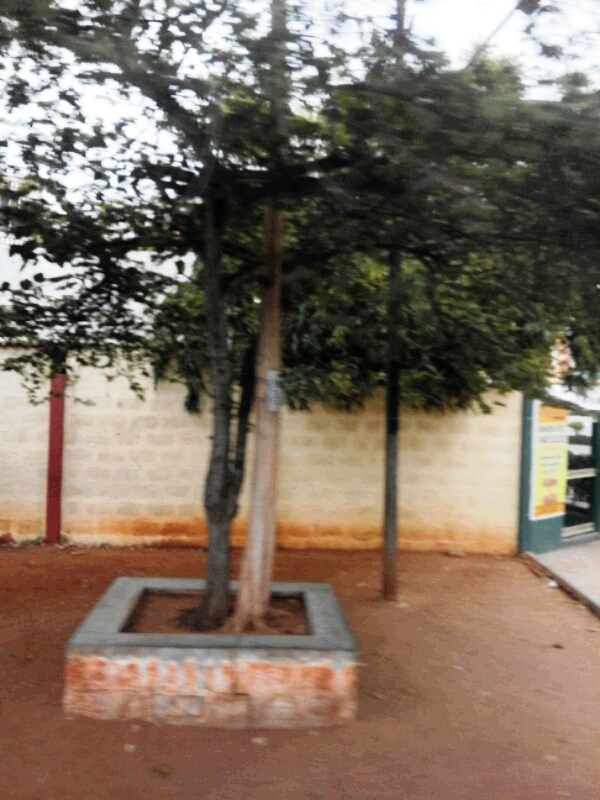
Maharshi Junction, Vidyaranyapuram

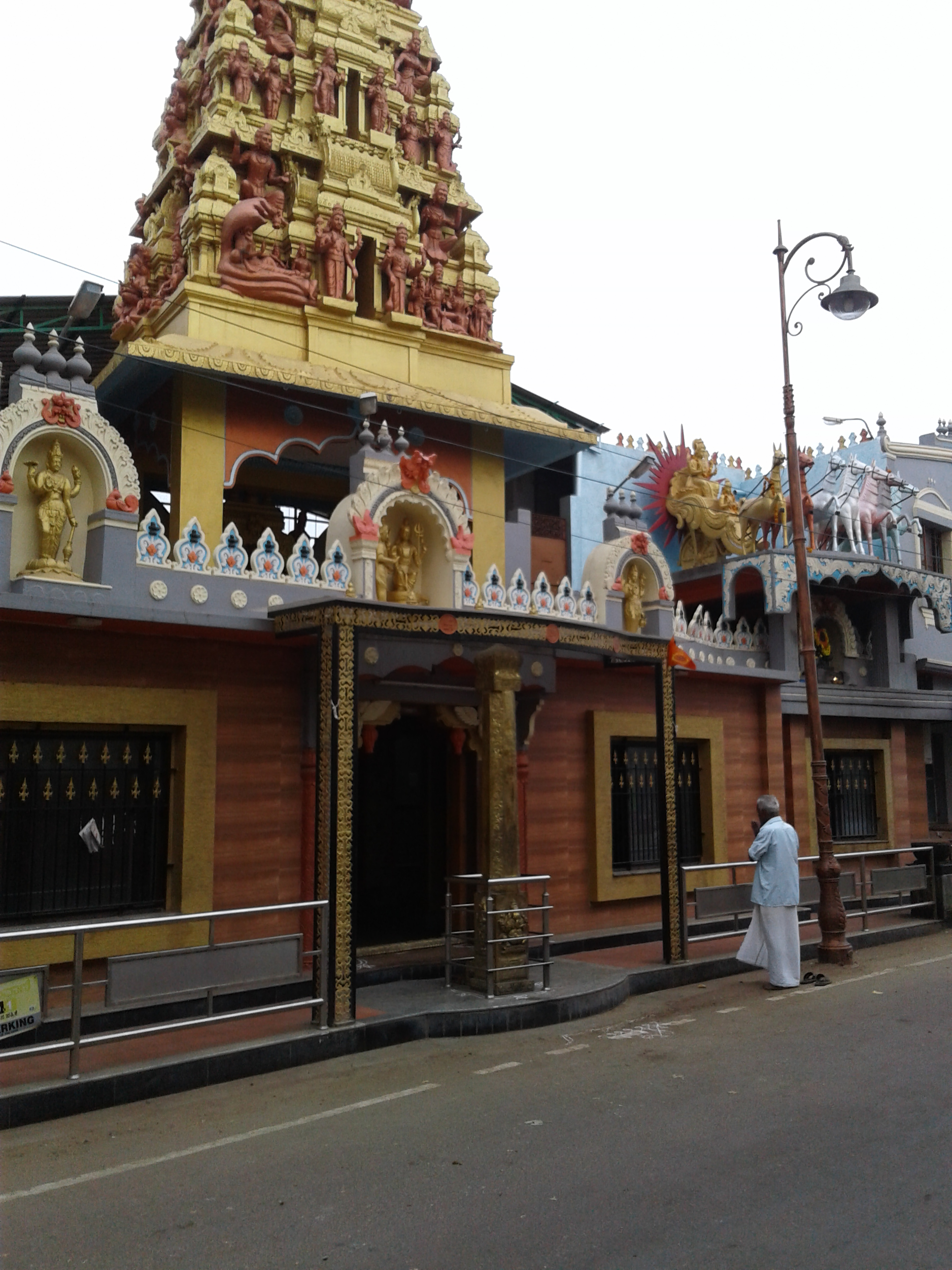
Ramalingeshwara Temple

Vidyaranyapuram is a suburb of Mysore City in the Karnataka state of India.

== Location ==
Vidyaranyapuram is located on the southern side of Mysore City on the road to Jayaprakash Nagar Mysore.

== Landmarks ==
- Vishweshwarara Nagar
- Gundu Rao Nagar
- Sterling Theatre Junction
- Sewage Farm Junction
- Maharshi group of institutions
- Sewage Farm

== Image gallery ==
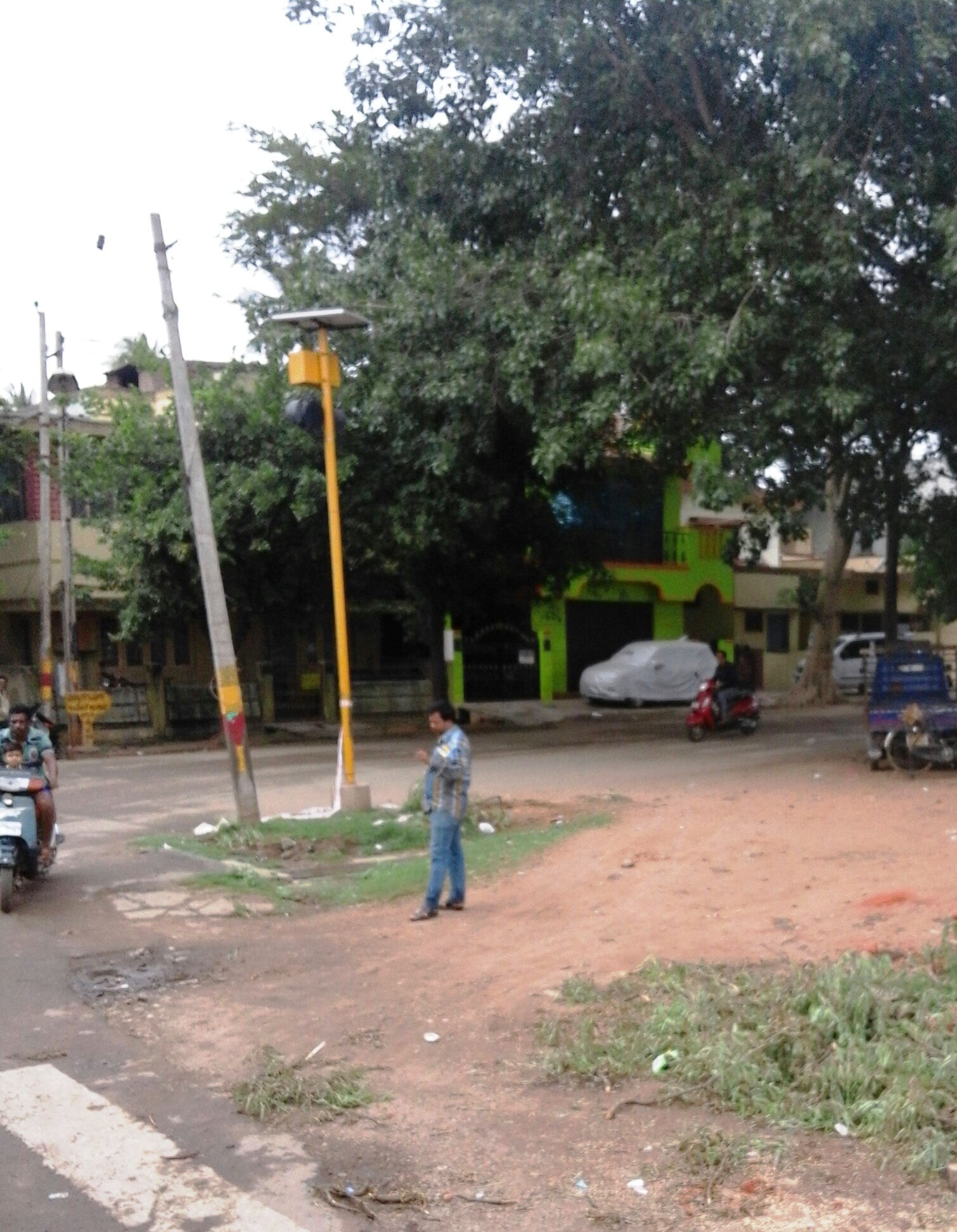
Sewage Farm junction

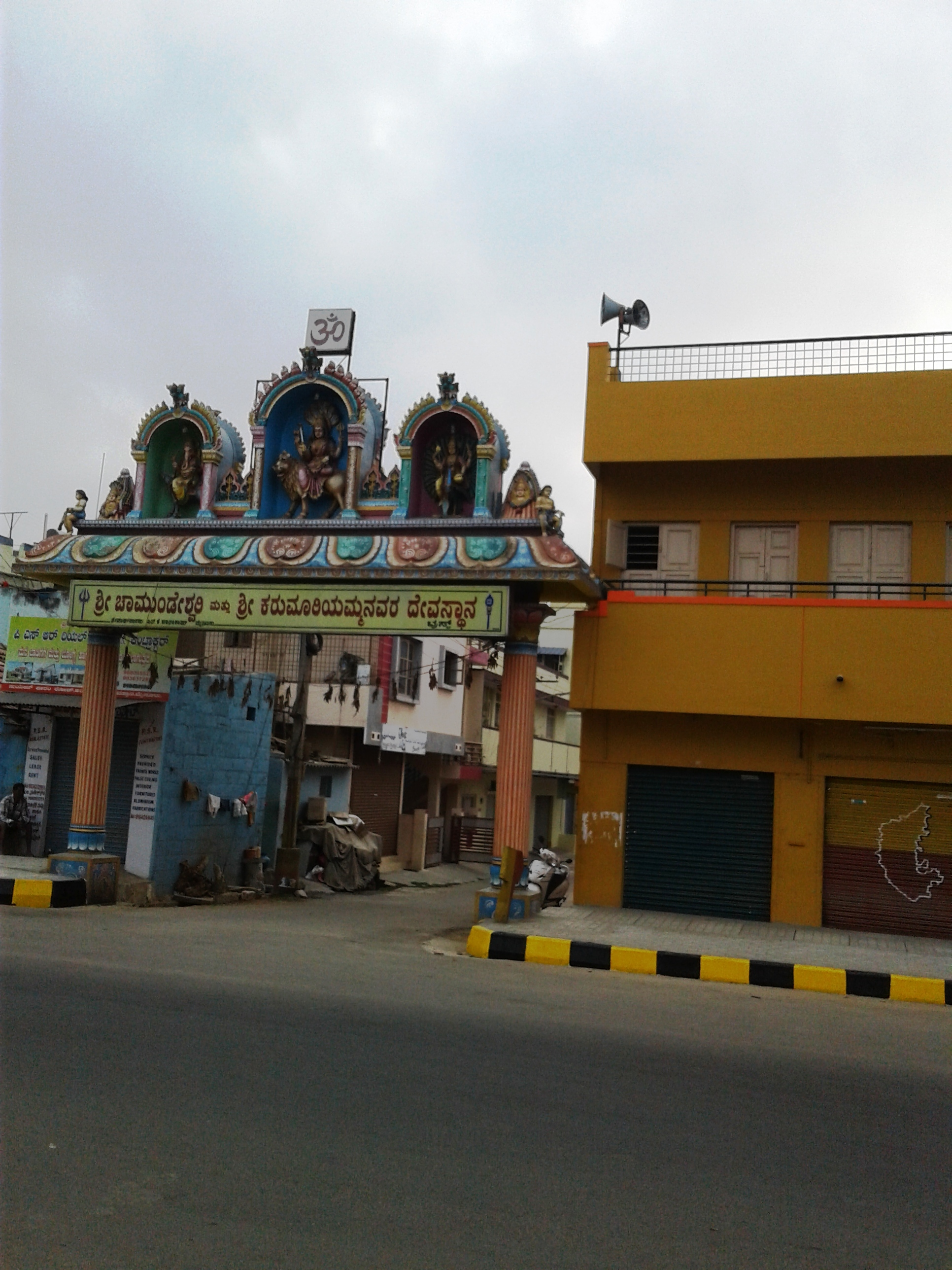
Chamundeshwari temple

== See also ==
- Jayaprakash Nagar Mysore
- Ashokapuram, Mysore
- Nanju Mallige
- Mananthavady Road
