= Nanchanahalli Palya =

Coordinates: 12.266378°N 76.634672°E

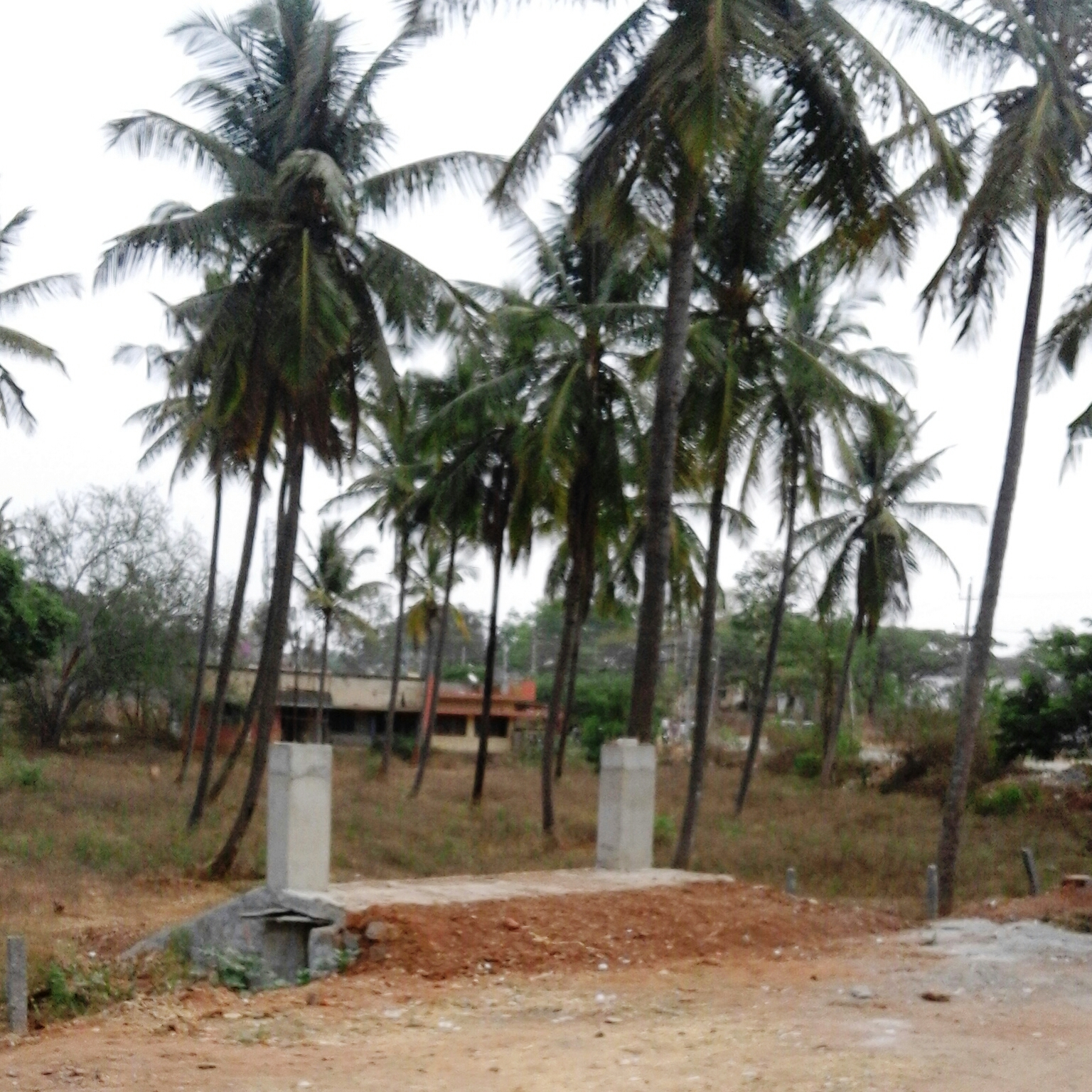
N.H.Palaya

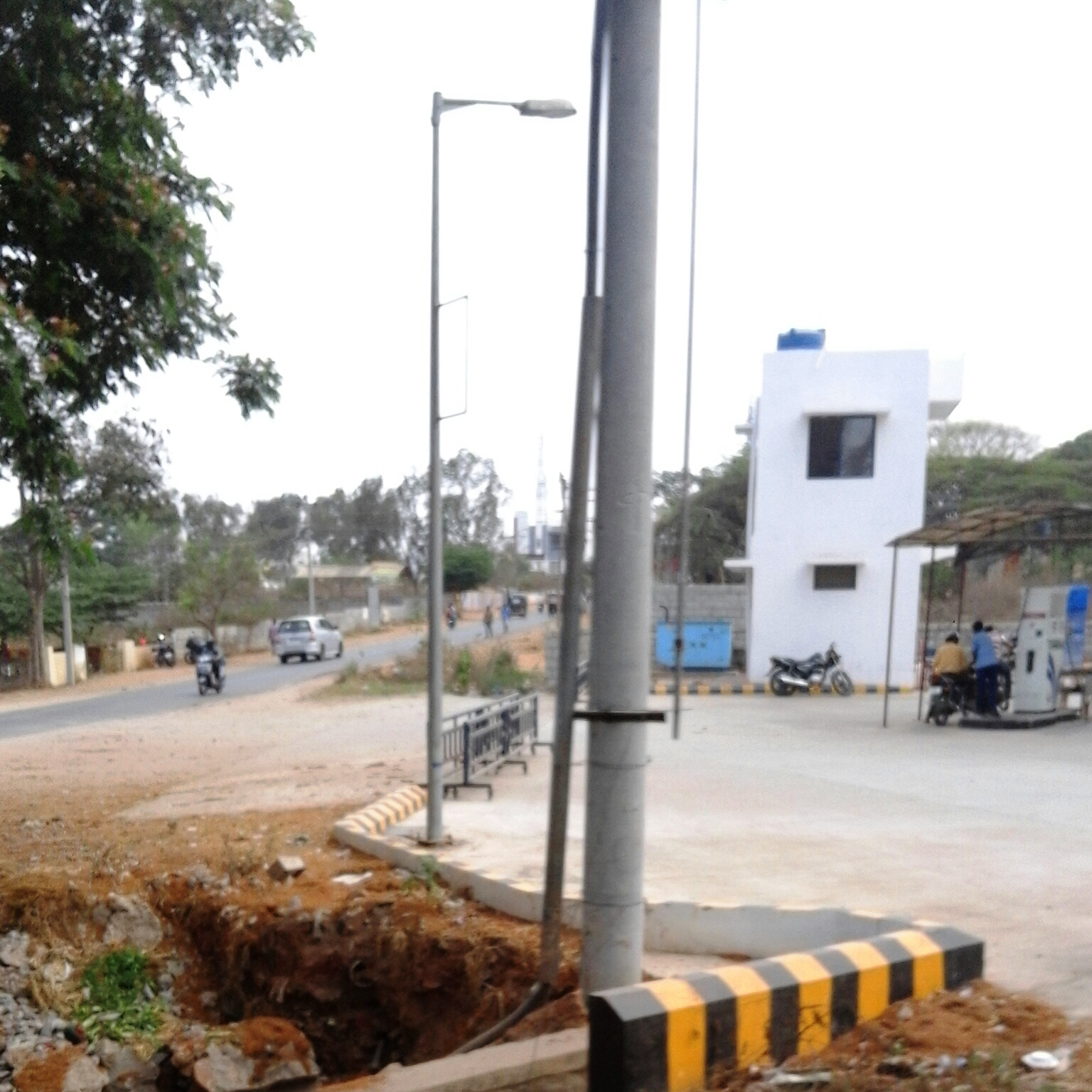
Nanchanahalli Palaya

Nanchana Halli Palaya or N.H.Palaya is a suburb of Mysore city in Karnataka province of India.

== Location ==
N.H.Palaya is located on Mananthavady Road at a distance of two kilometres from Mysore.

== Education ==
GHPS Urdu School is the only educational facility of the slum village.

== Post Office ==
There is a post office in the village with the postal code 570008.
