= Railway Workshop, Mysore =

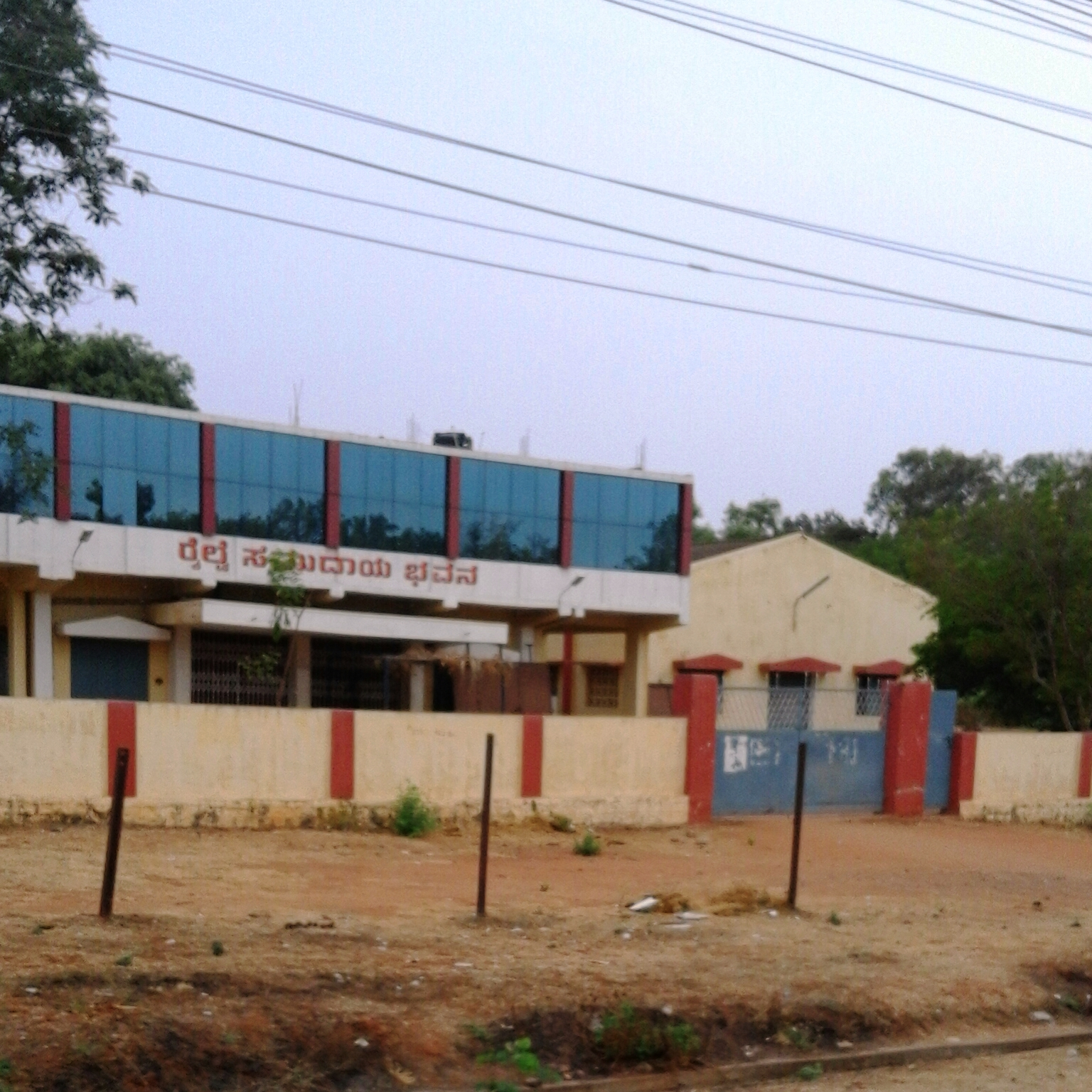
Railway Workshop, Mysore

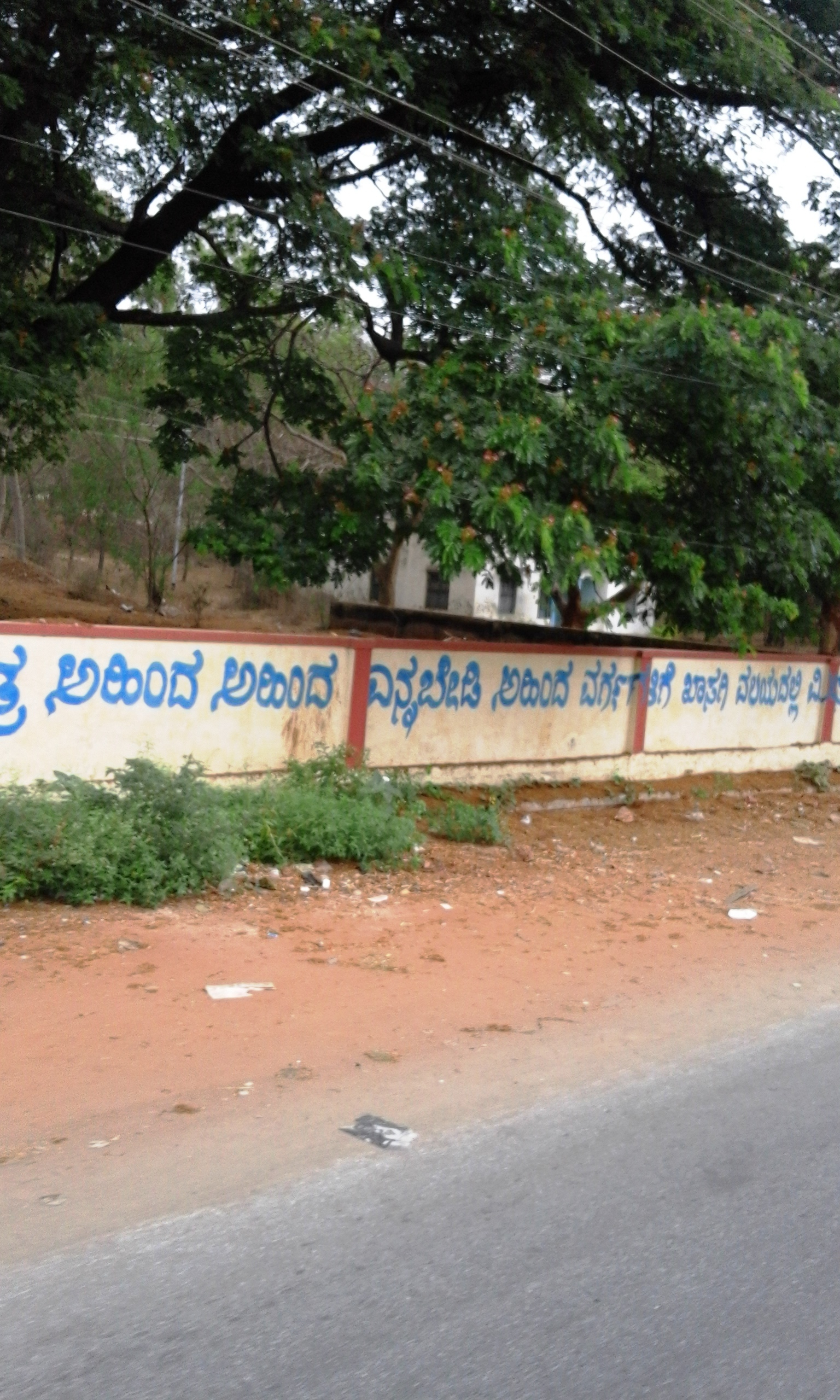
Another view of the workshop

Central Railway Workshop, Mysore is a repair facility of Indian Railways situated at Mysore in Karnataka province of India.

== History ==
The central workshop in Mysore was established as a base workshop of the old Mysore state railway in 1938. The workshop celebrated Golden Jubilee during the year 1988. Initially, the Workshop was headed by Works Manager till the year 1988. Thereafter, the Post of Workshop head was upgraded as Dy.Chief Mechanical Engineer. The first Dy.CME was Sri.K. Subramanyam. During the year 1992–93, the workshop was headed by Chief Workshop Manager for brief period as the workshop was being upgraded to cater to Periodic Overhauling of Broad Gauge Coaches. During the year 2004, the post of Workshop head was finally upgraded to Chief Workshop Manager and Sri.Sushil Chandra was the first incumbent to the post of CWM of Mysore Workshops under the new regime of South Western Railway.

== South Western Railway ==
This workshop has been a part of the South Western Railway since 2003.

== Activities ==
The workshop conducts regular overhauling of all types of coaches and also manufactures toy trains.

== See also ==
- Indian Railways
