= Mananthavady Road =

Agricultural suburb of Mysore

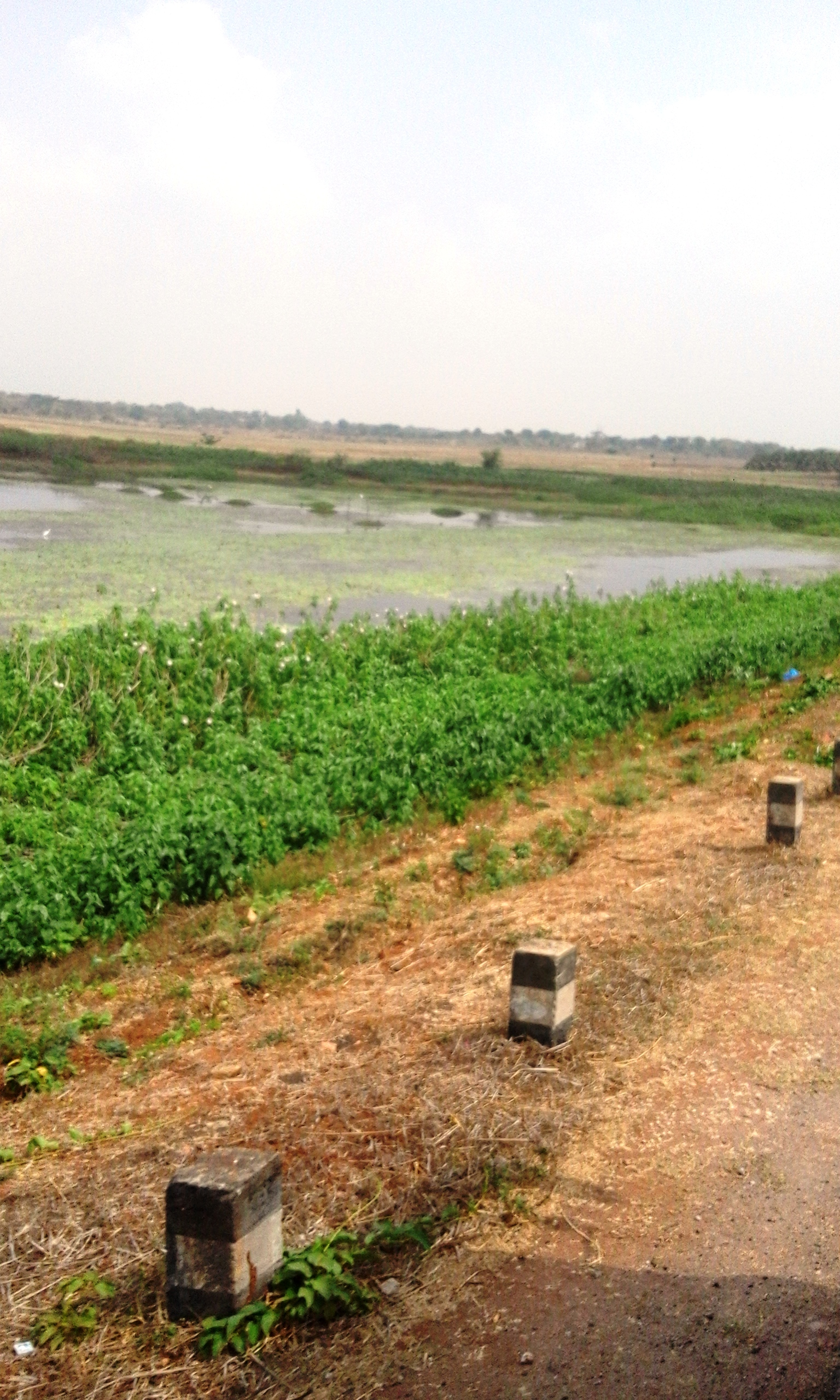
Manandvadi Road, Mysore

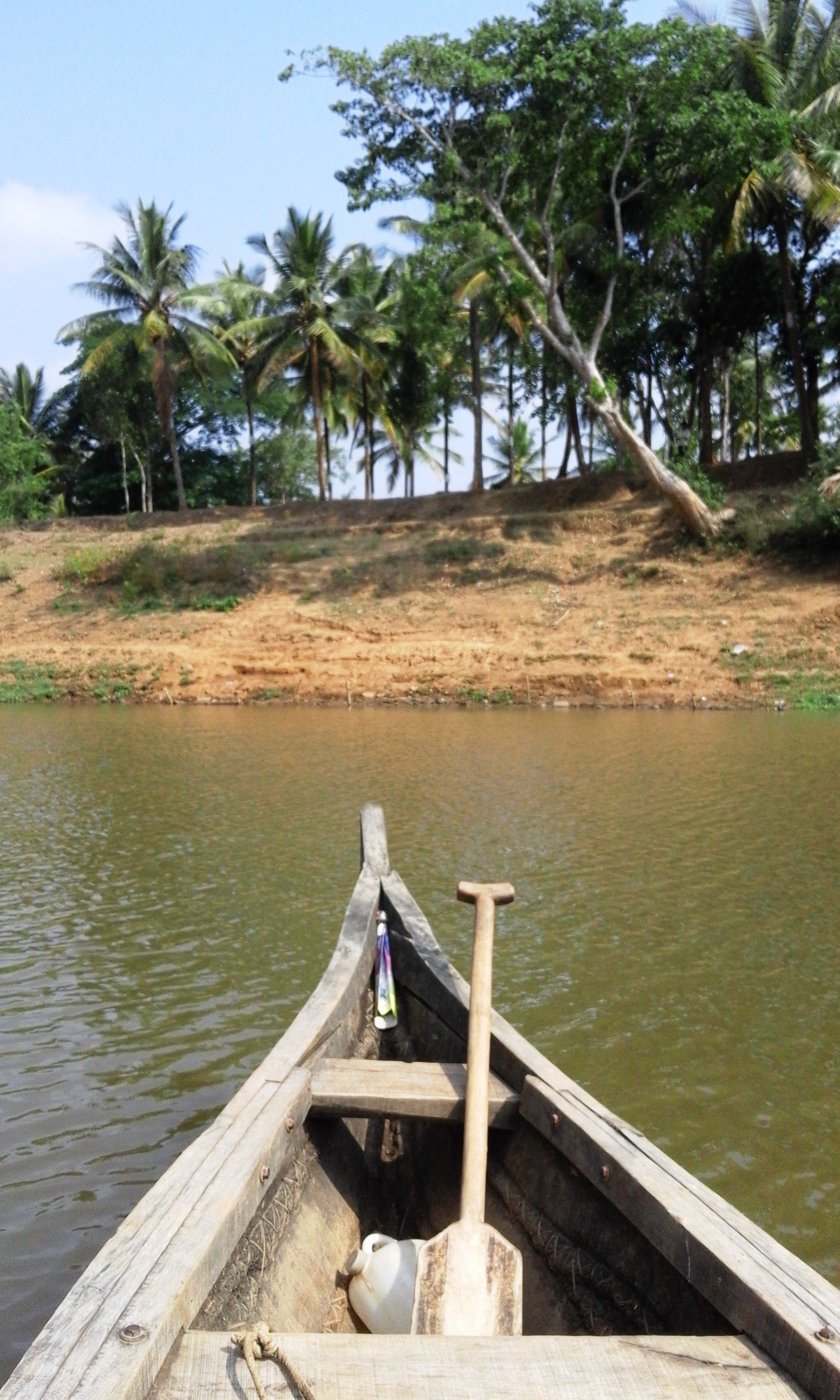
Machur Nagerhole

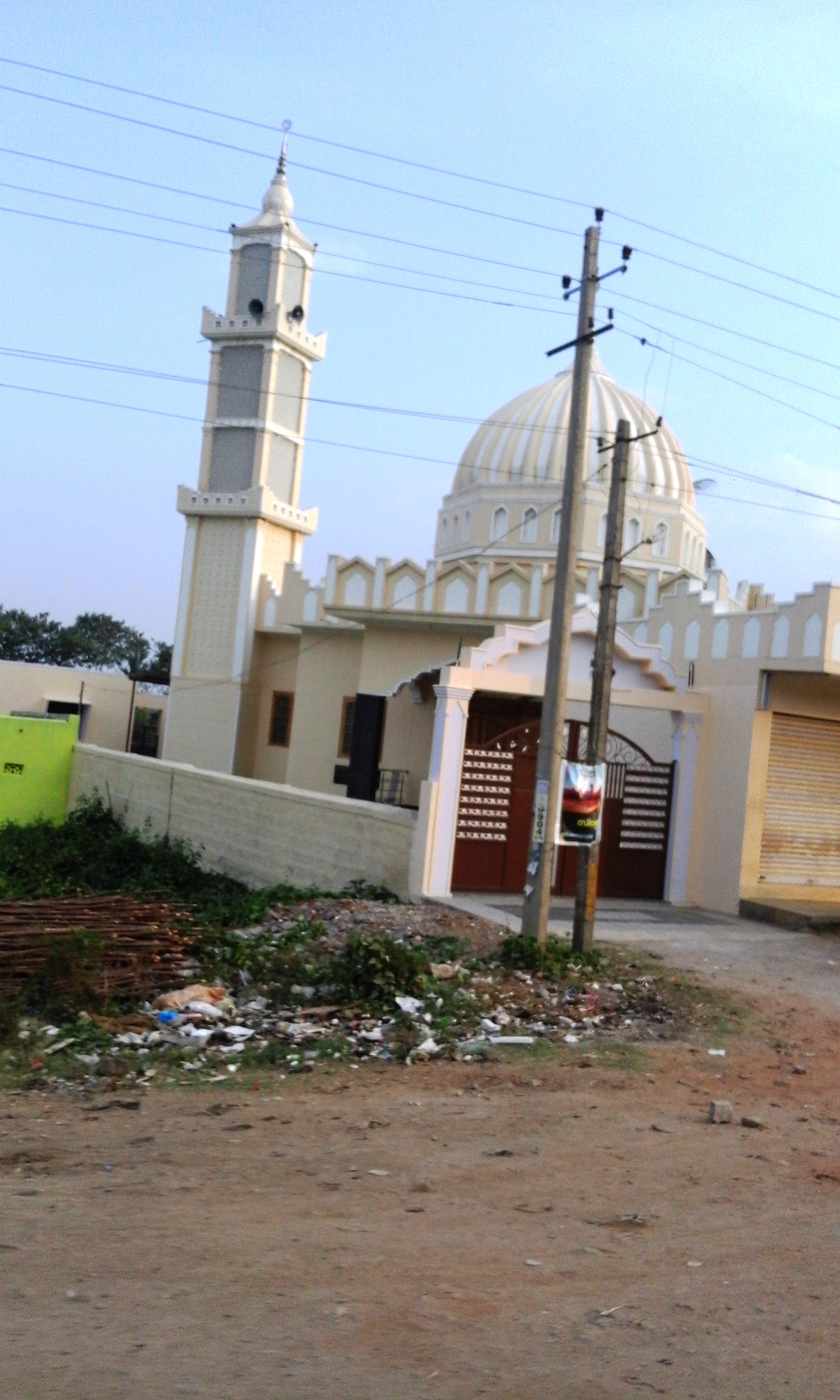
Mosque at Handpost Junction

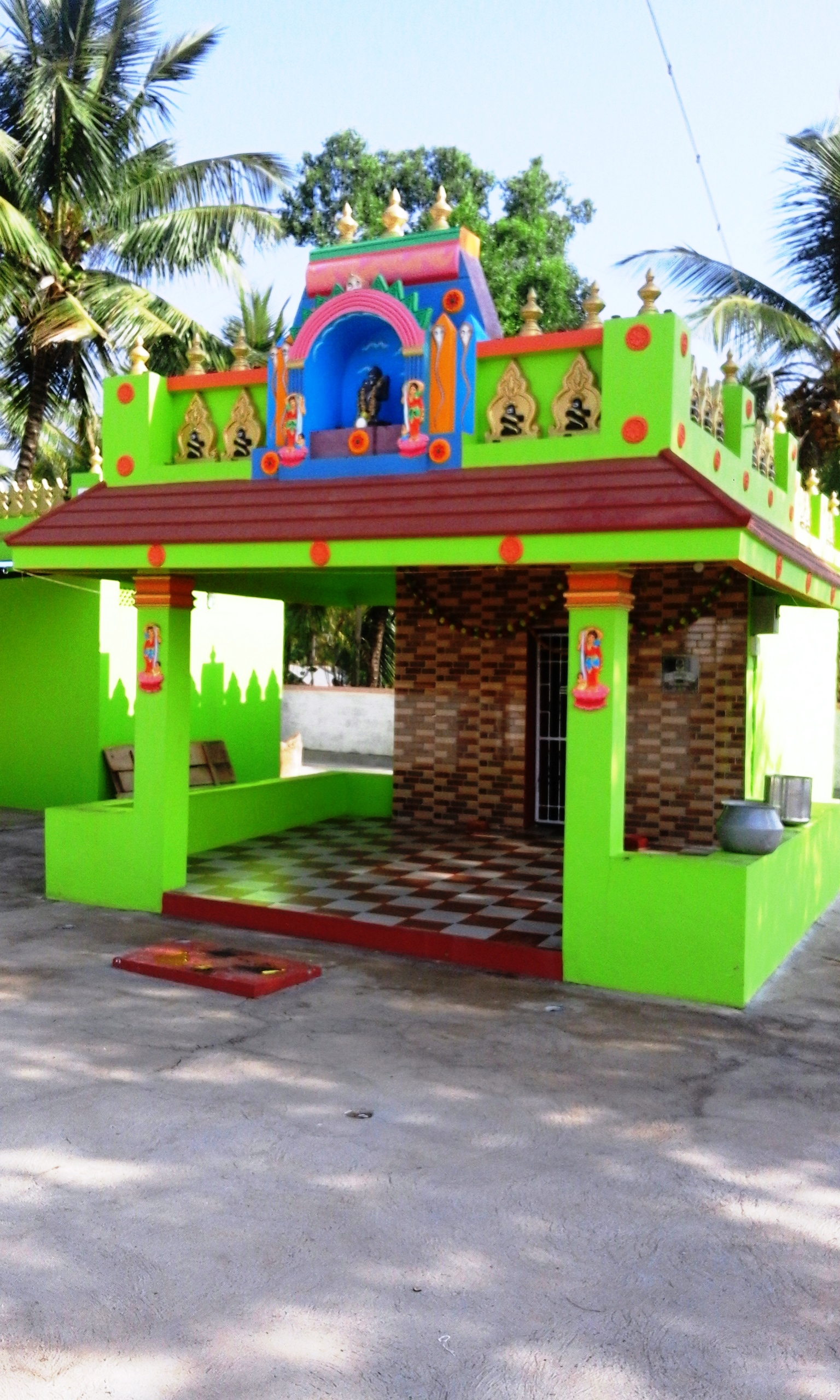
Kenchalagudu village near Mysore

Mananthavady Road is an agricultural suburb of Mysore district in the Indian state of Karnataka.

== Terminology ==
The term Mananthavady Road is used for the 52 km stretch of road between Mysore and Heggadadevanakote (H.D.Kote) town in Karnataka. Some people use the term for the entire stretch up to Mananthavady town in Kerala province. The second stretch of the road passes through Nagarhole National Park. The second stretch is another 70 km long.

== Populated Places ==
=== Towns on the Mananthavady Route ===
- Srirampur
- Handpost
- H.D.Kote
- Jayapura

=== Villages on the Mananthavady Route ===
- N.H.Palaya
- Kalavadi
- Kenchalagudu
- Kaliyugamane
- D.Salundi
- Doddundi
- D.B.Kuppe
- Machur
- Balle Elephant Camp
- Karapura
- Nisana Belathur
- Hemmankette
- Dommanakatete
- Anthare santhe
- Lakshmi pura
- Mahadeva Nagara
- Harohalli

== Landmarks and Organizations ==
- Kaliyuva Mane School
- Railway workshop
- National Institute of Engineering

== Image gallery ==
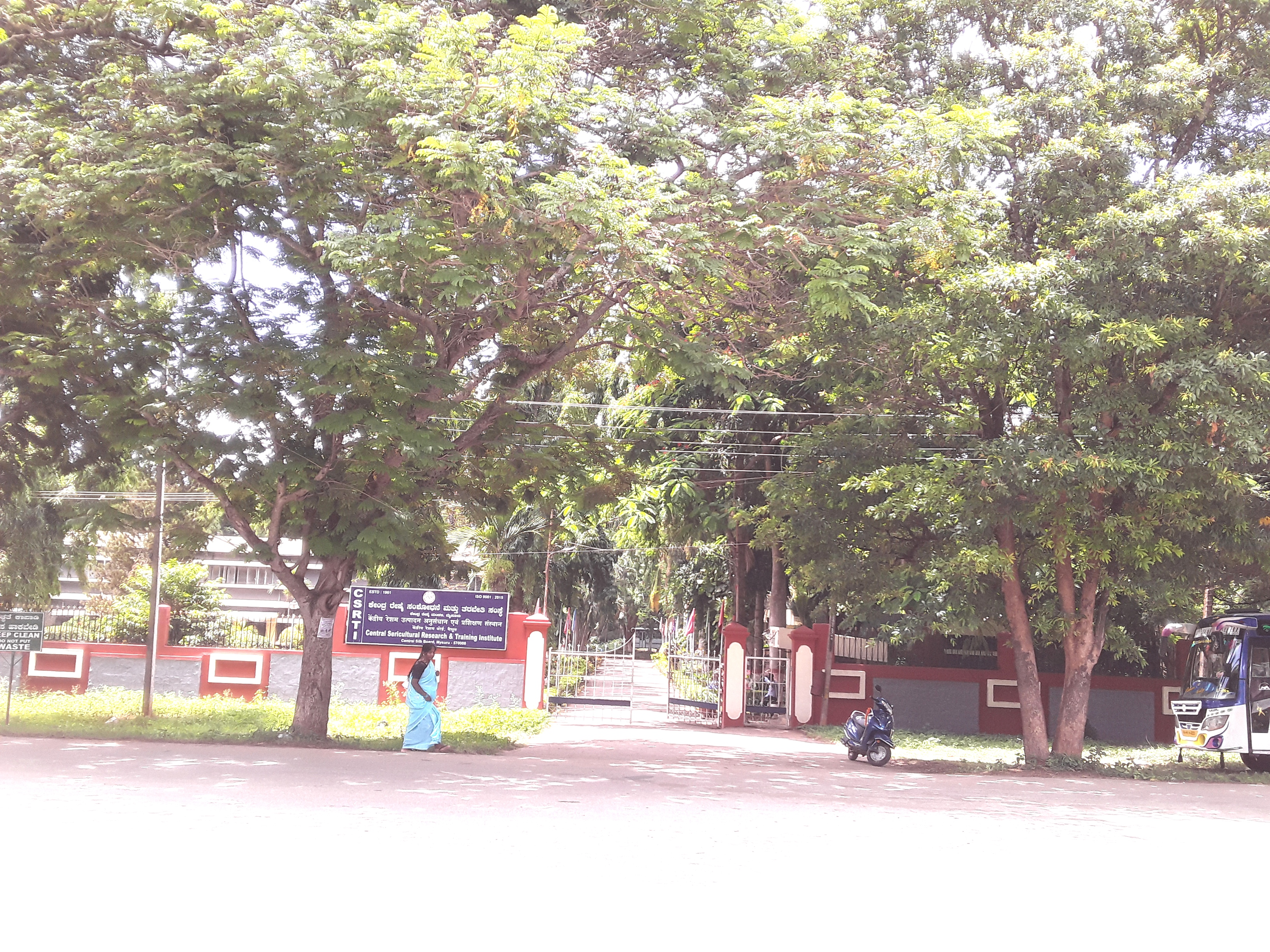
Sericulture Institute

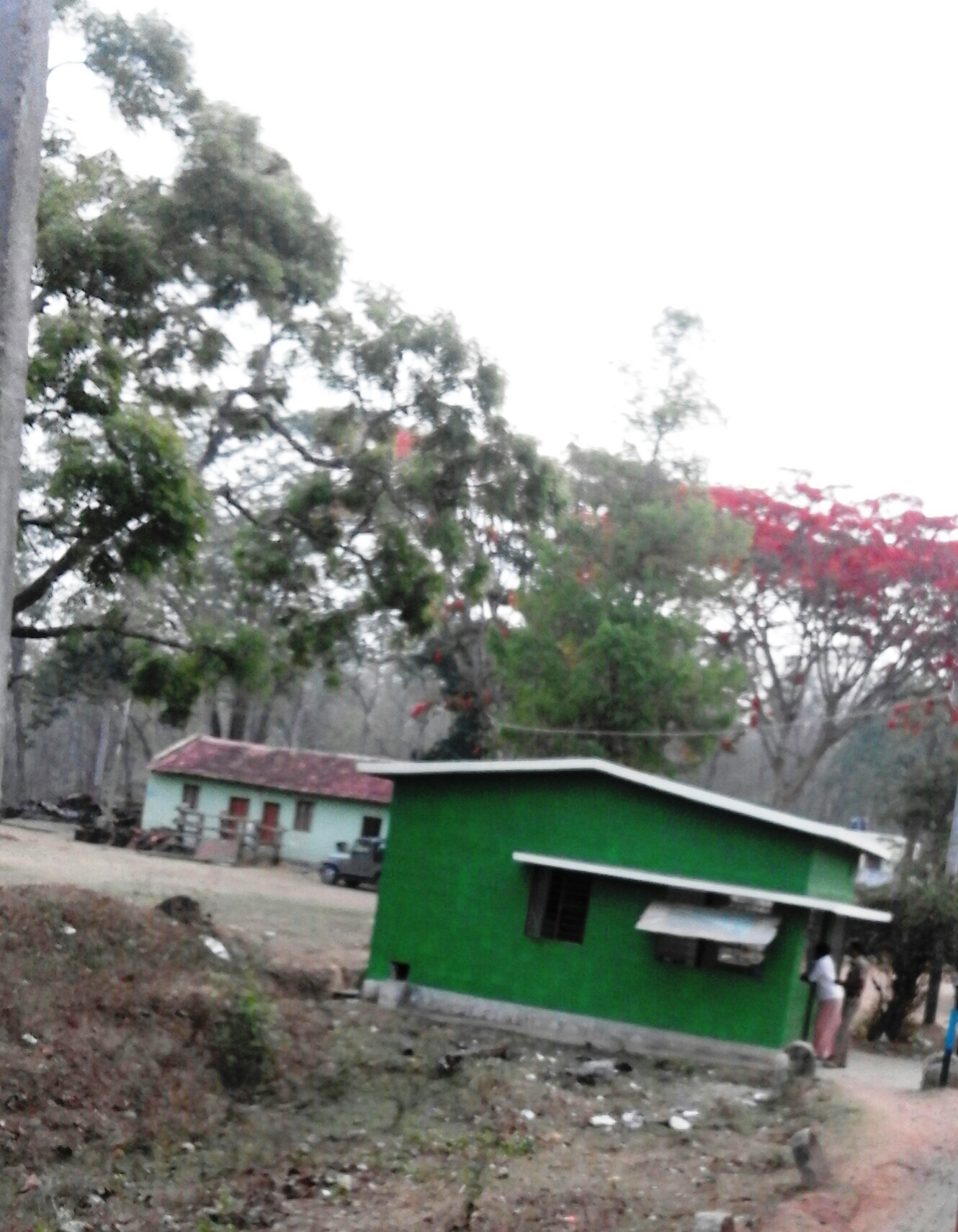
Balle Elephant Camp

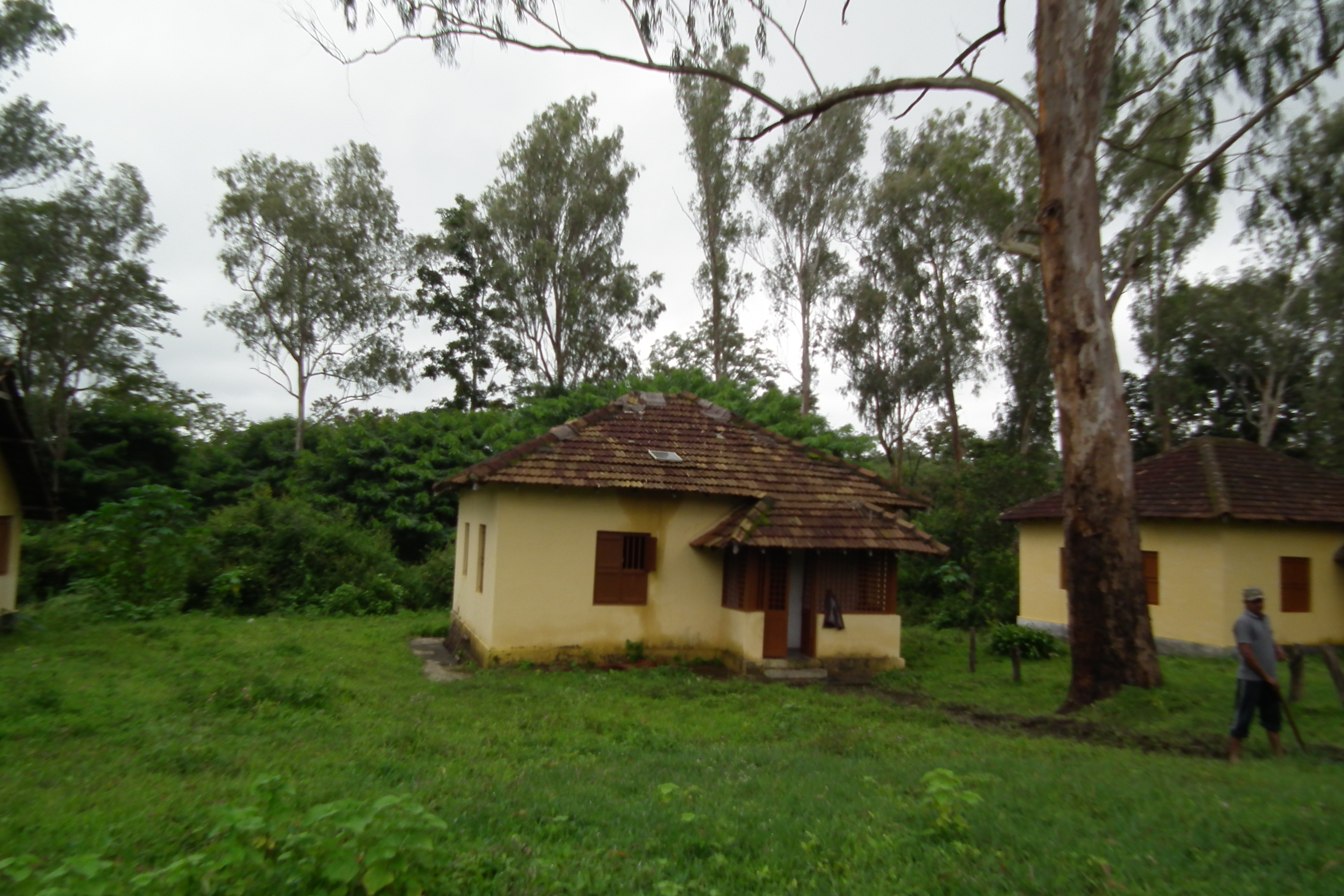
Nagarhole National Park, Kodagu

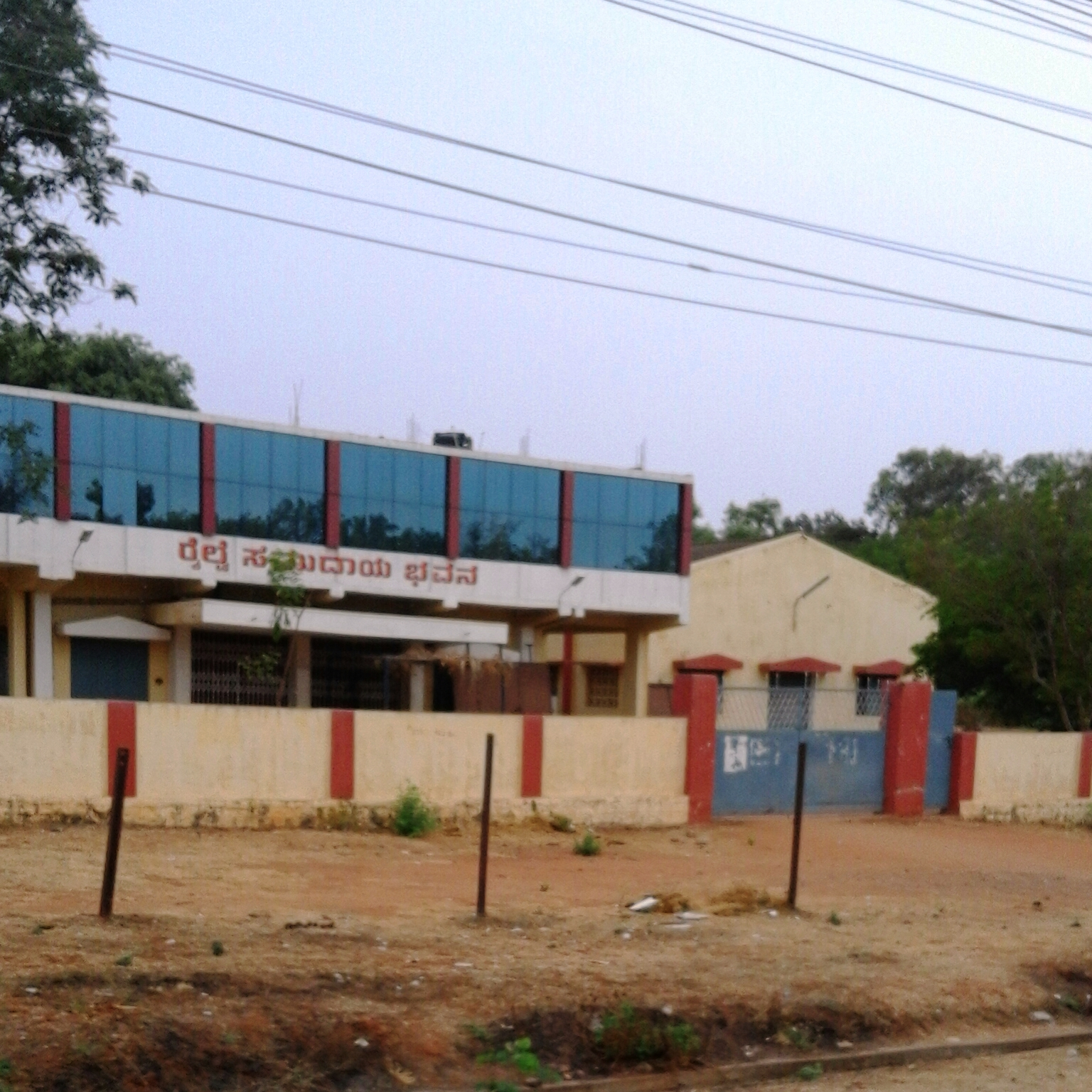
Central Railway Workshop, Mysore

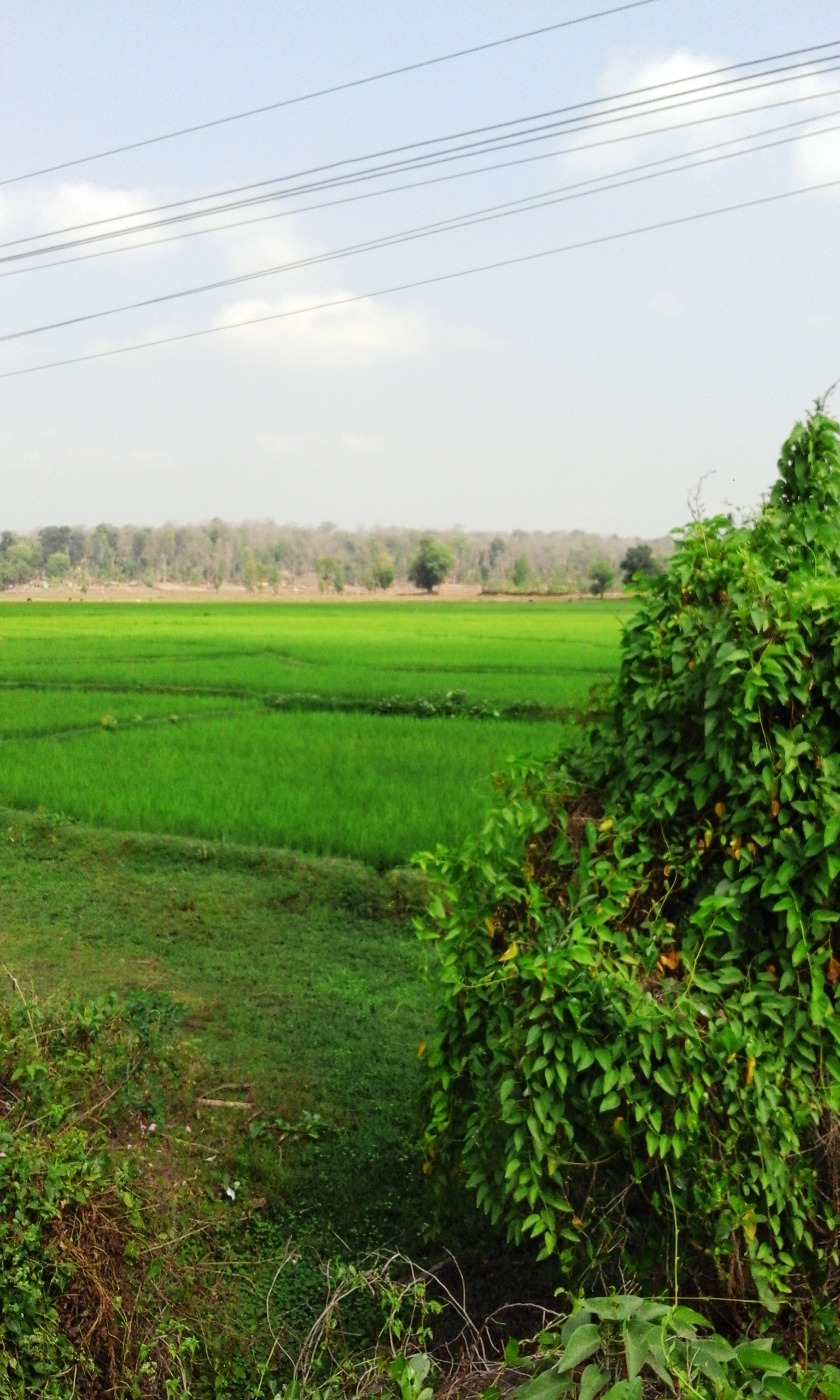
Machur village

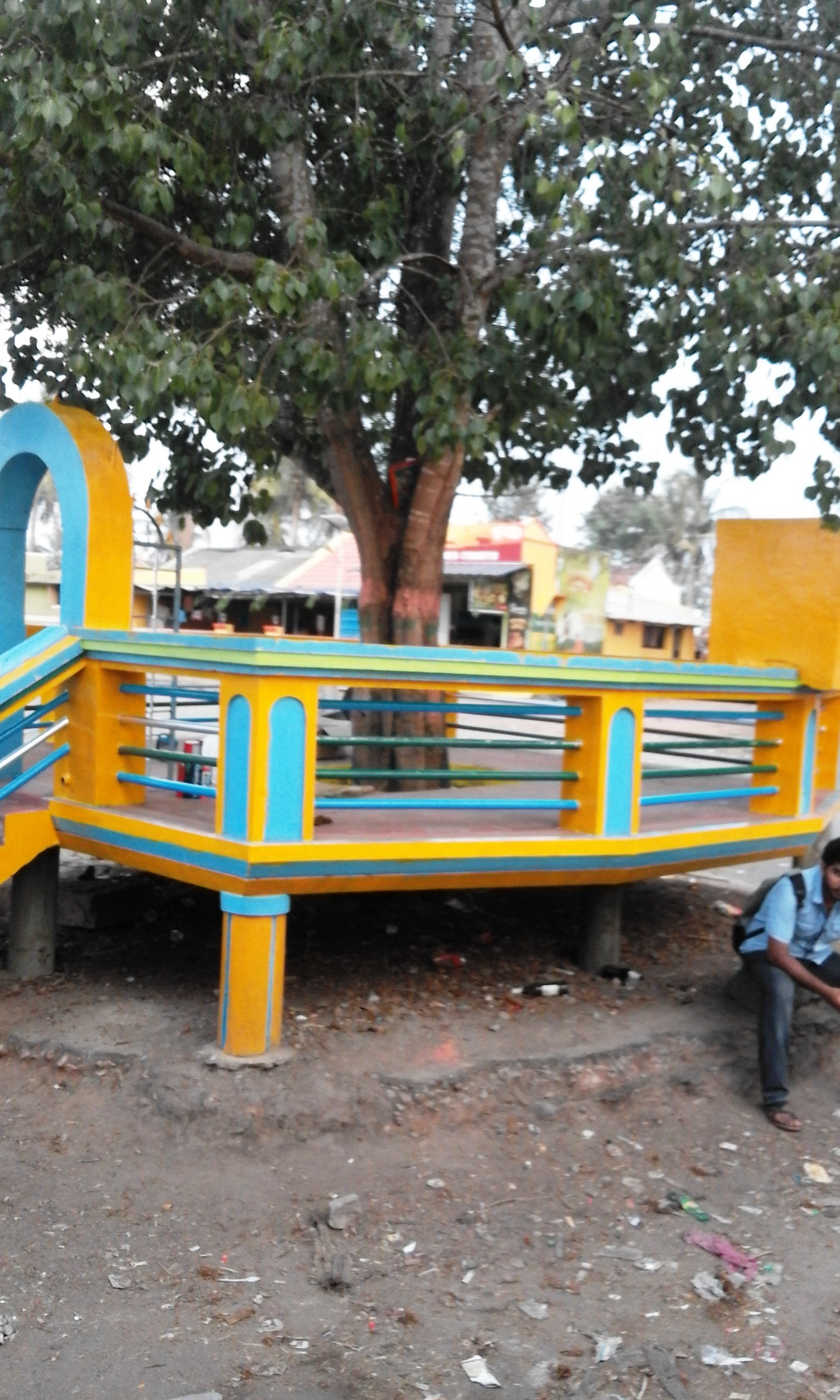
Karappuram village

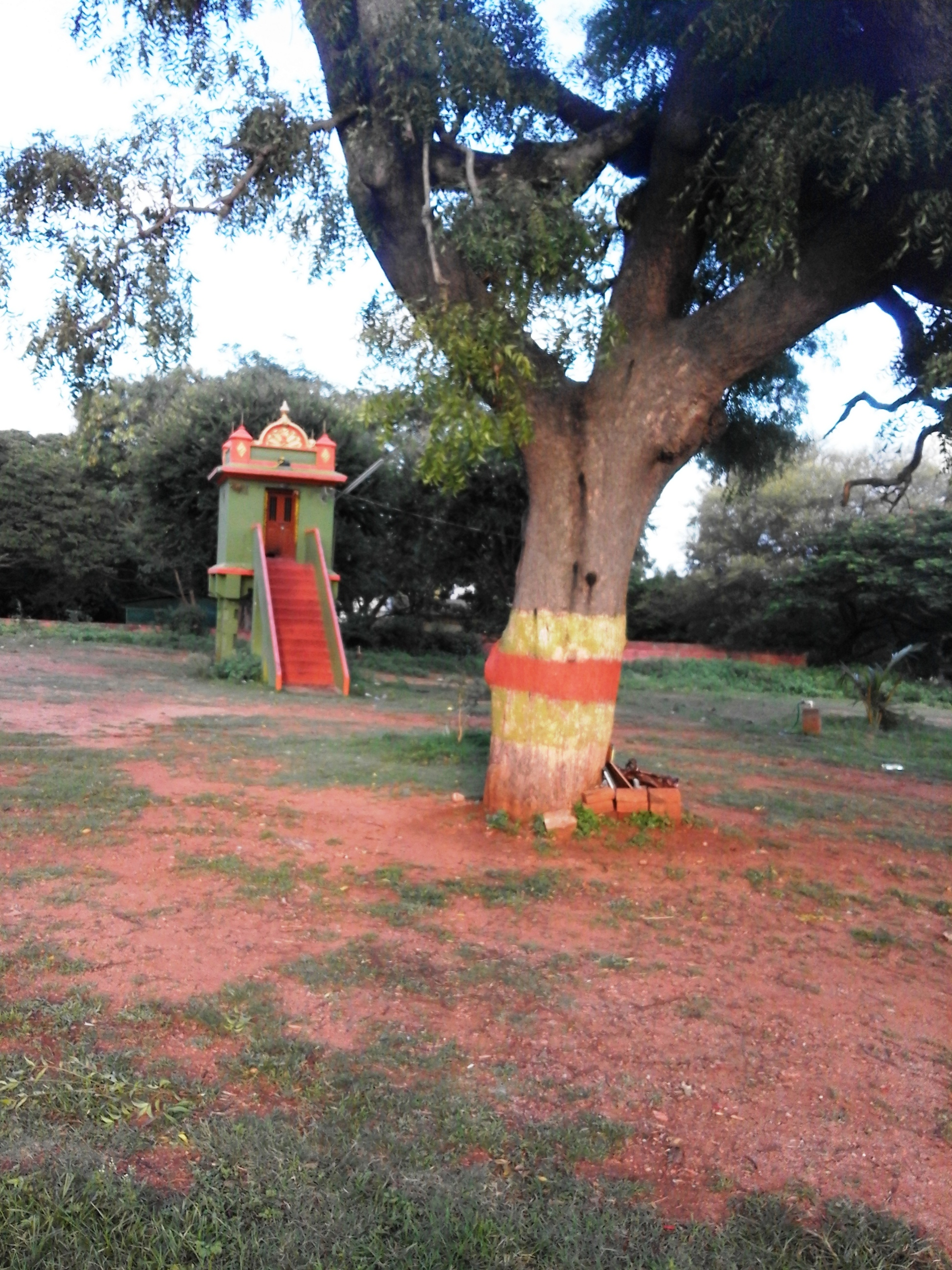
Ammari Amman Temple

== See also ==
- Ashokapuram, Mysore
- Jayaprakash Nagar Mysore
- H.D.Kote
- Nagarhole
