= Anthara Santhe =

- village cluster
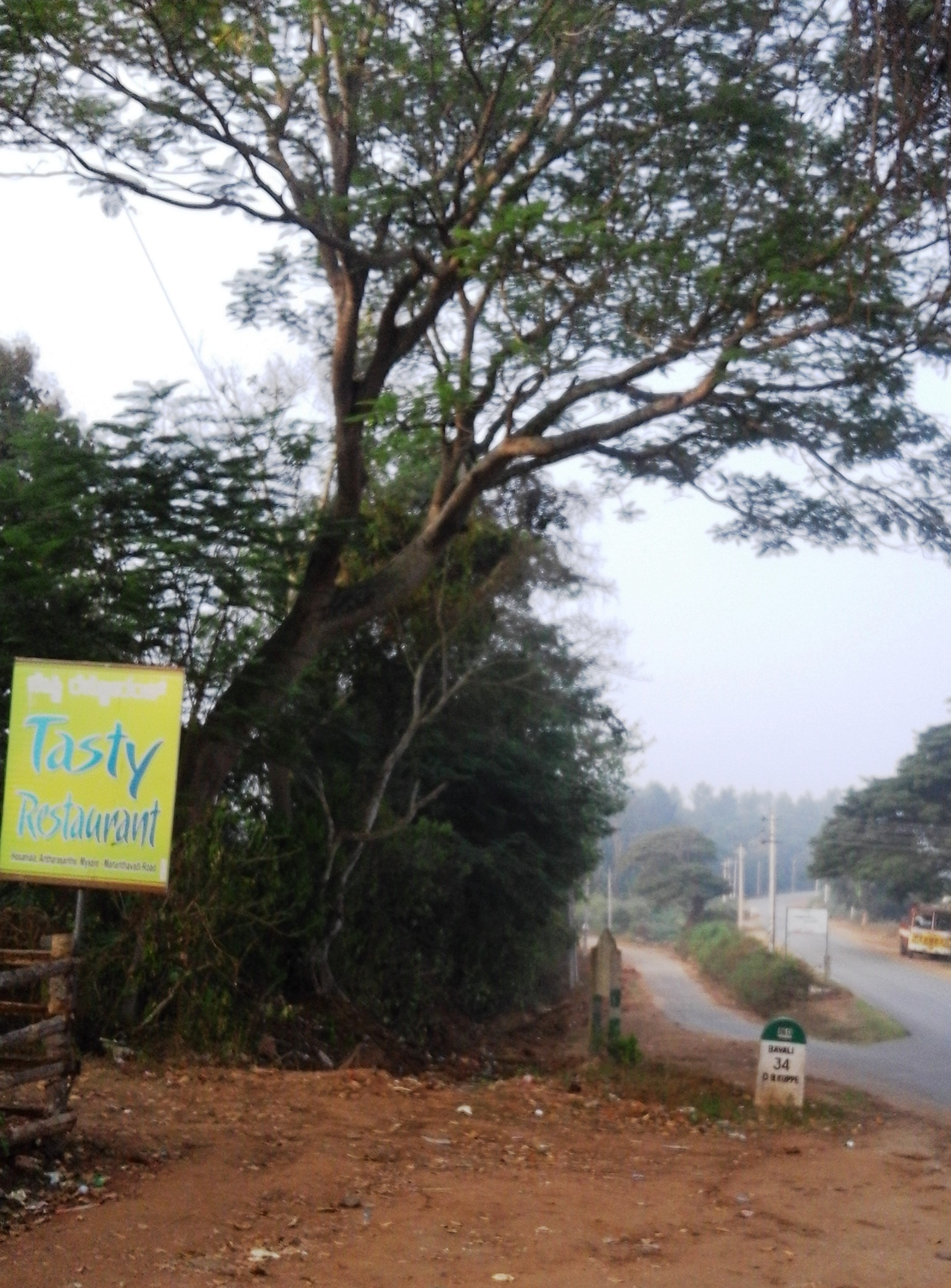
- Antharasanthe village
- Interactive map of Anthara Santhe
- Coordinates: 12.018418°N 76.299185°E
- Country: India
- State: Karnataka
- District: Mysore

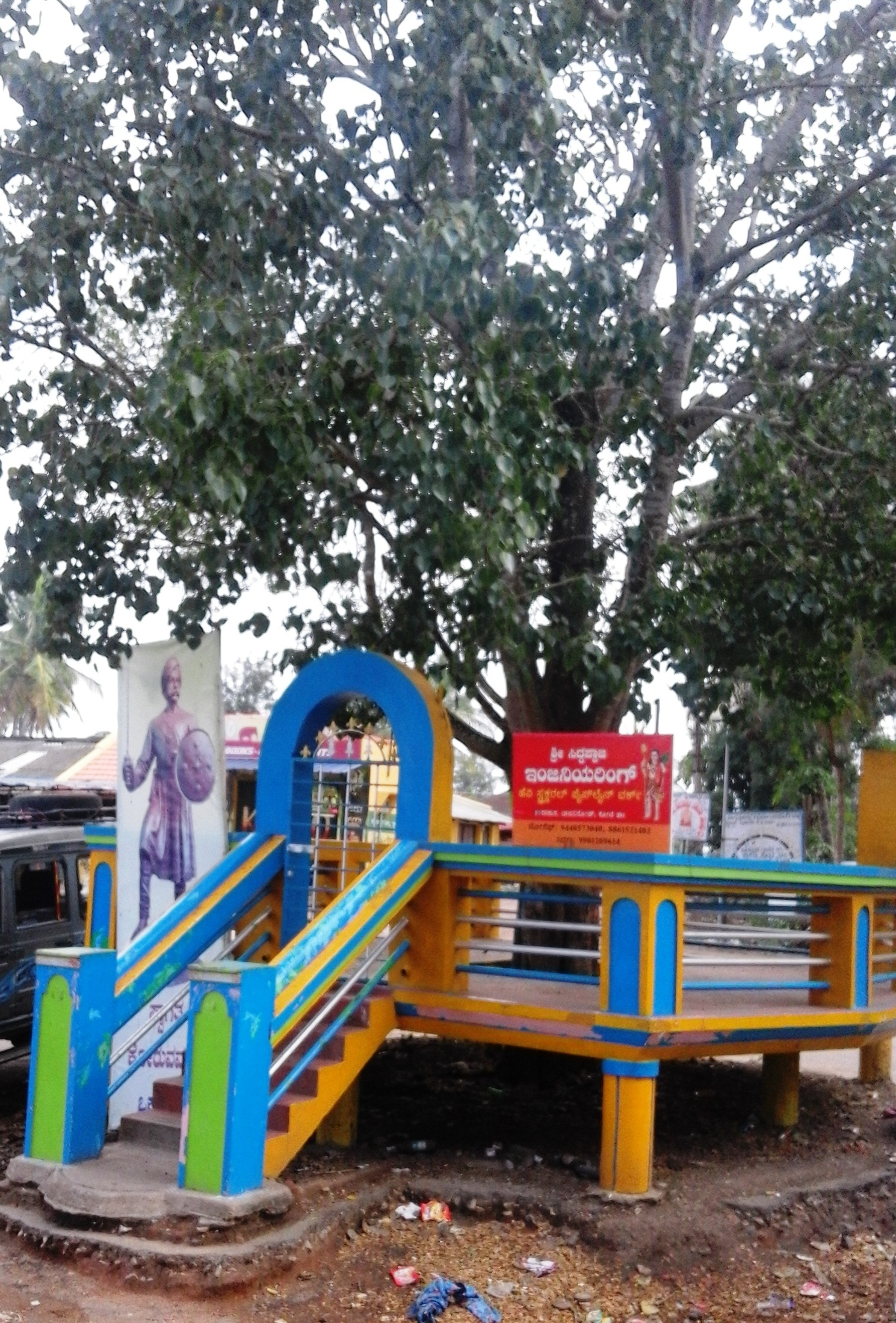
Karappuram village, Anthare Santhe

Anthare Santhe is a small town near Nagarhole National Park in Heggadadevankote, Mysore district, Karnataka, India.

== Location ==
Anthare Santhe is the nucleus of a series of villages situated deep inside the Nagerhole forest of Karnataka state. Kabini river and reservoir lies on the eastern side of all these villages.

== Balle Elephant Camp ==
Balle Elephant Camp is located near the Anthare Santhe village. It is part of the Nagerhole national forest and it is located at the Balle checkpost.

== Education ==
Honnamannakatte High School is the main educational organization in Anthara Santhe.

== Suburbs and villages ==
- D.B.Kuppe
- Machur
- Karapura
- Nisana Belathur
- Hemmankette
- Dommanakatete
- Lakshmi pura

== See also ==
- Balle Elephant Camp
- D.B.Kuppe
- Daripura, Mysore
- Harohalli
- Jayapura, Mysore
- Mandanahalli

== Image gallery ==
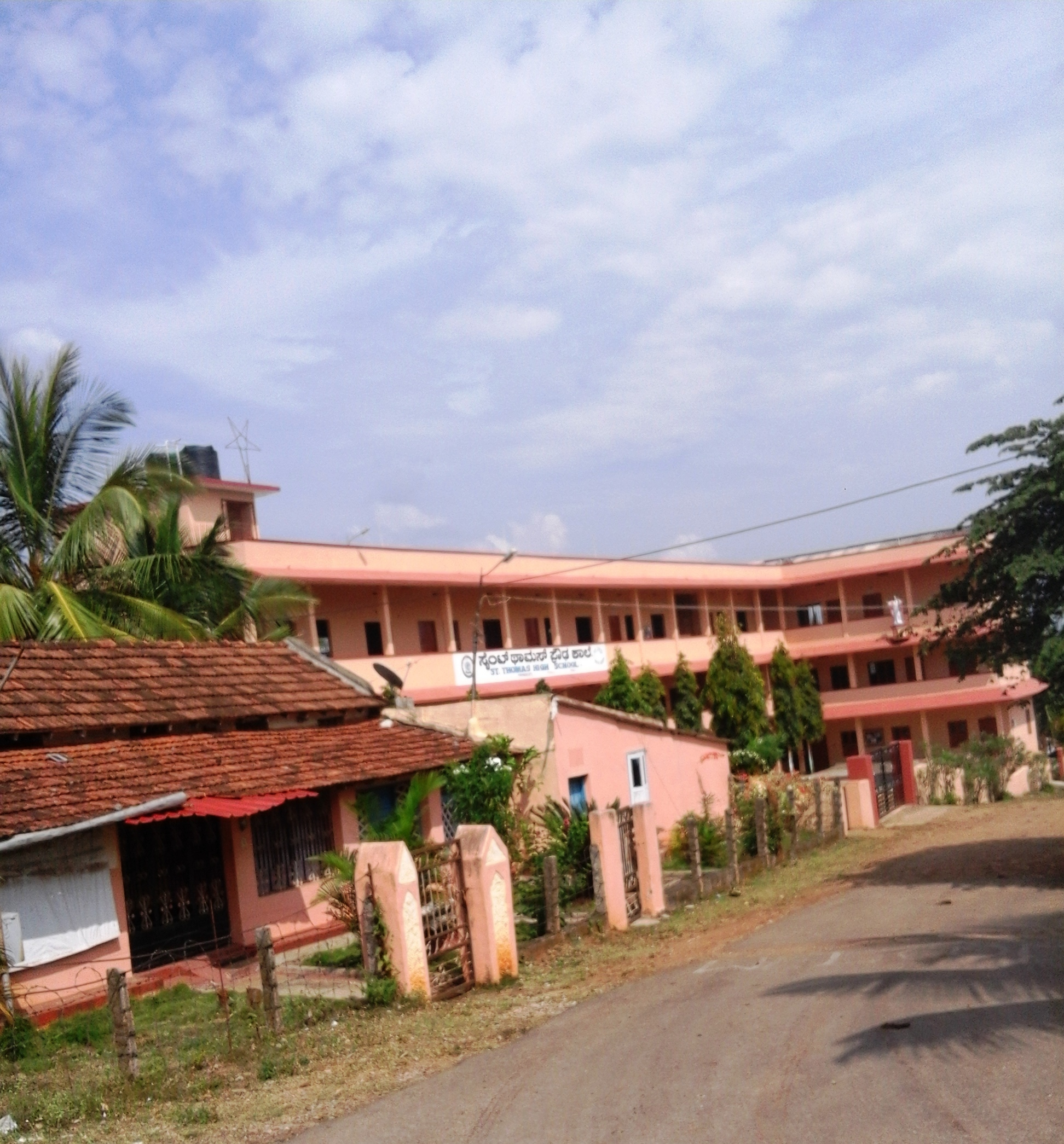
Hemmankette village

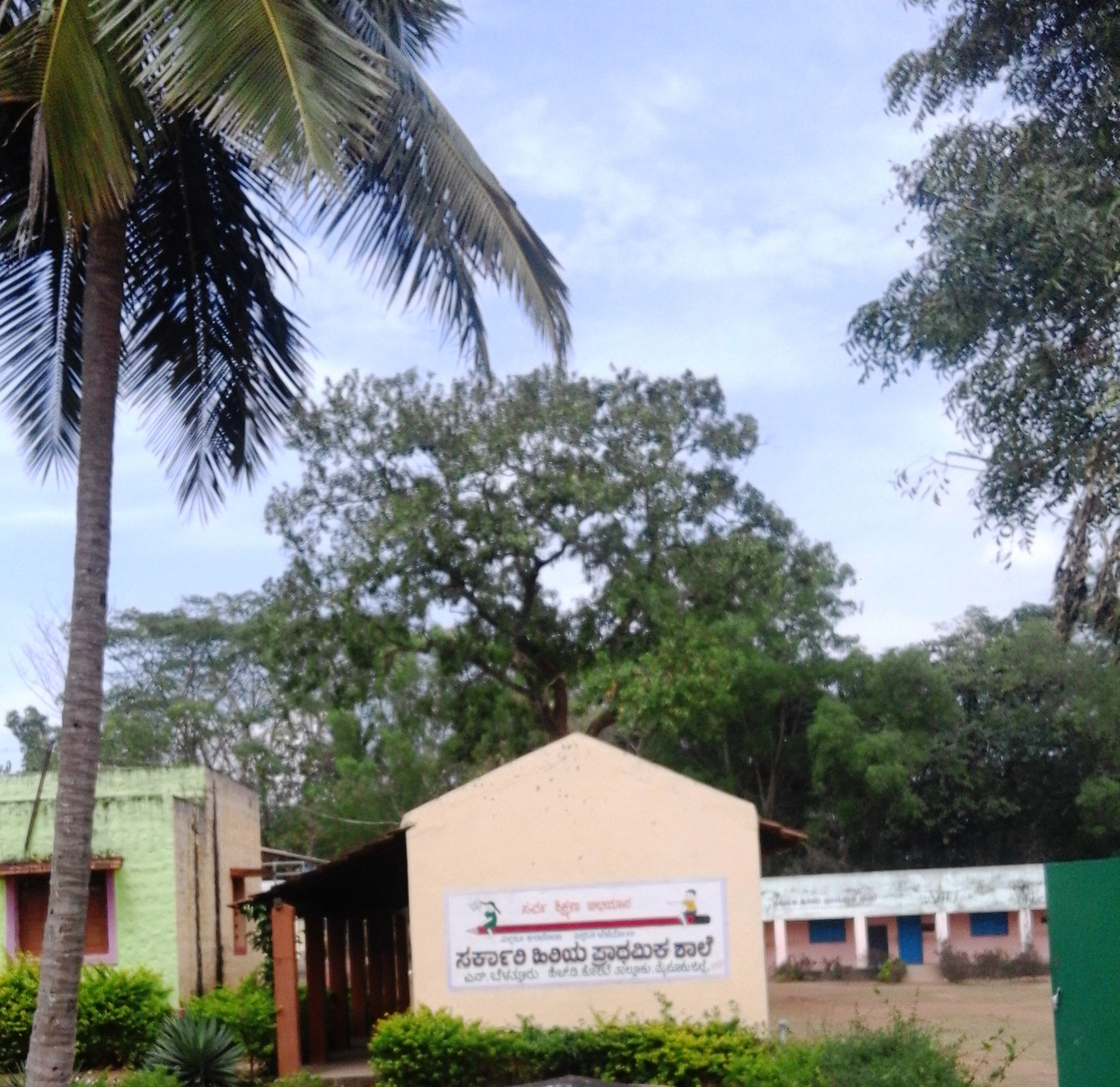
Nisana Belathur school

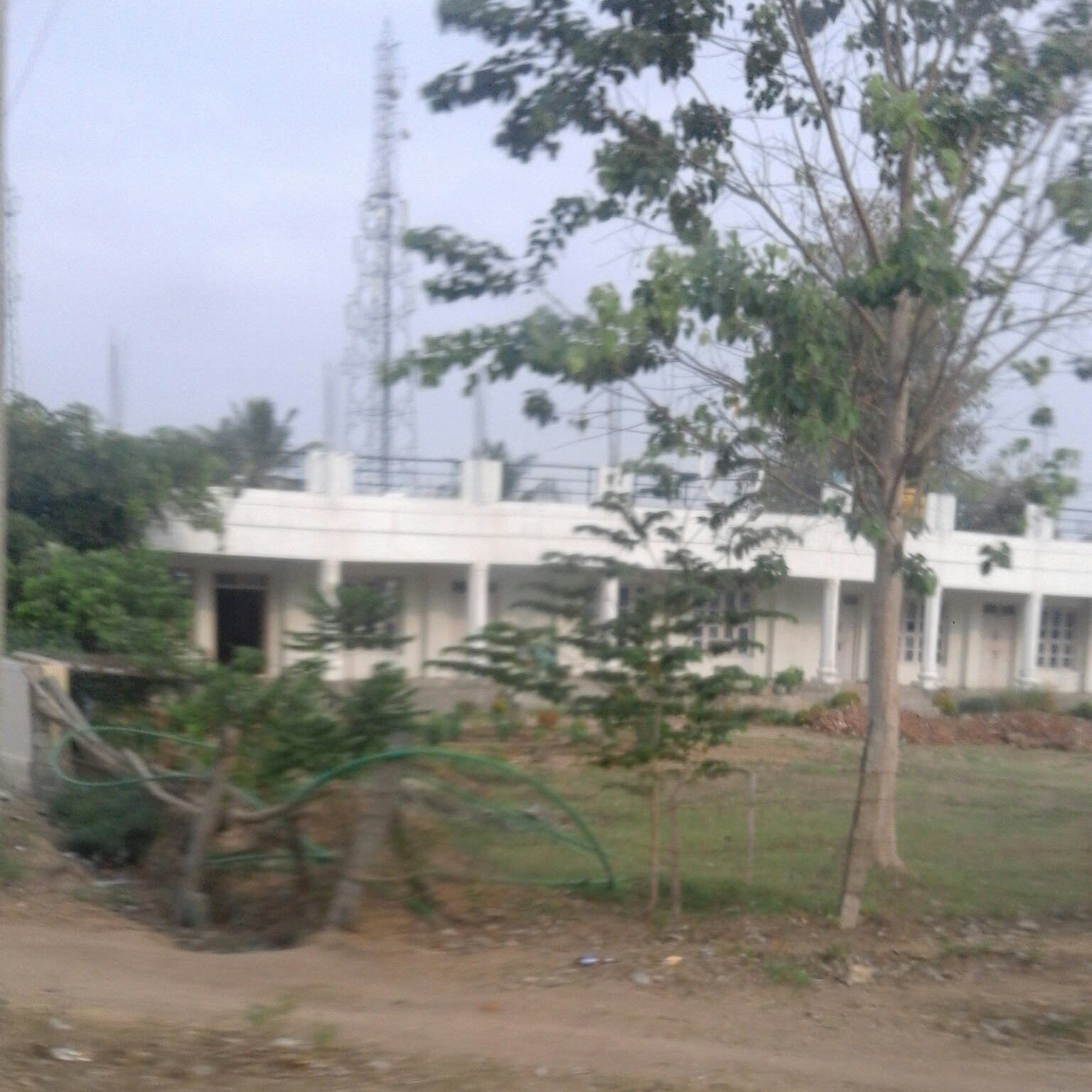
Anthare Santhe village

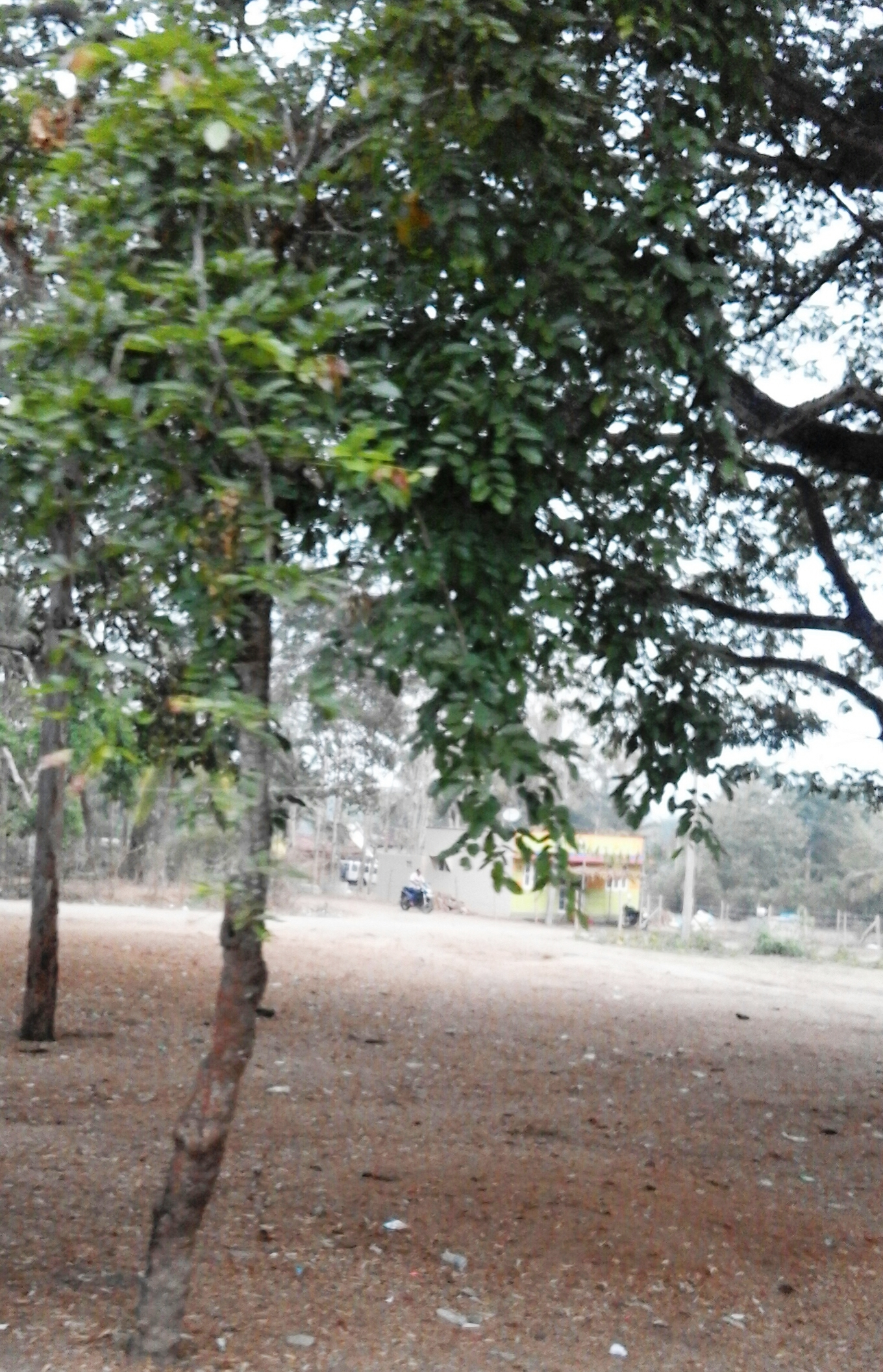
Malali village

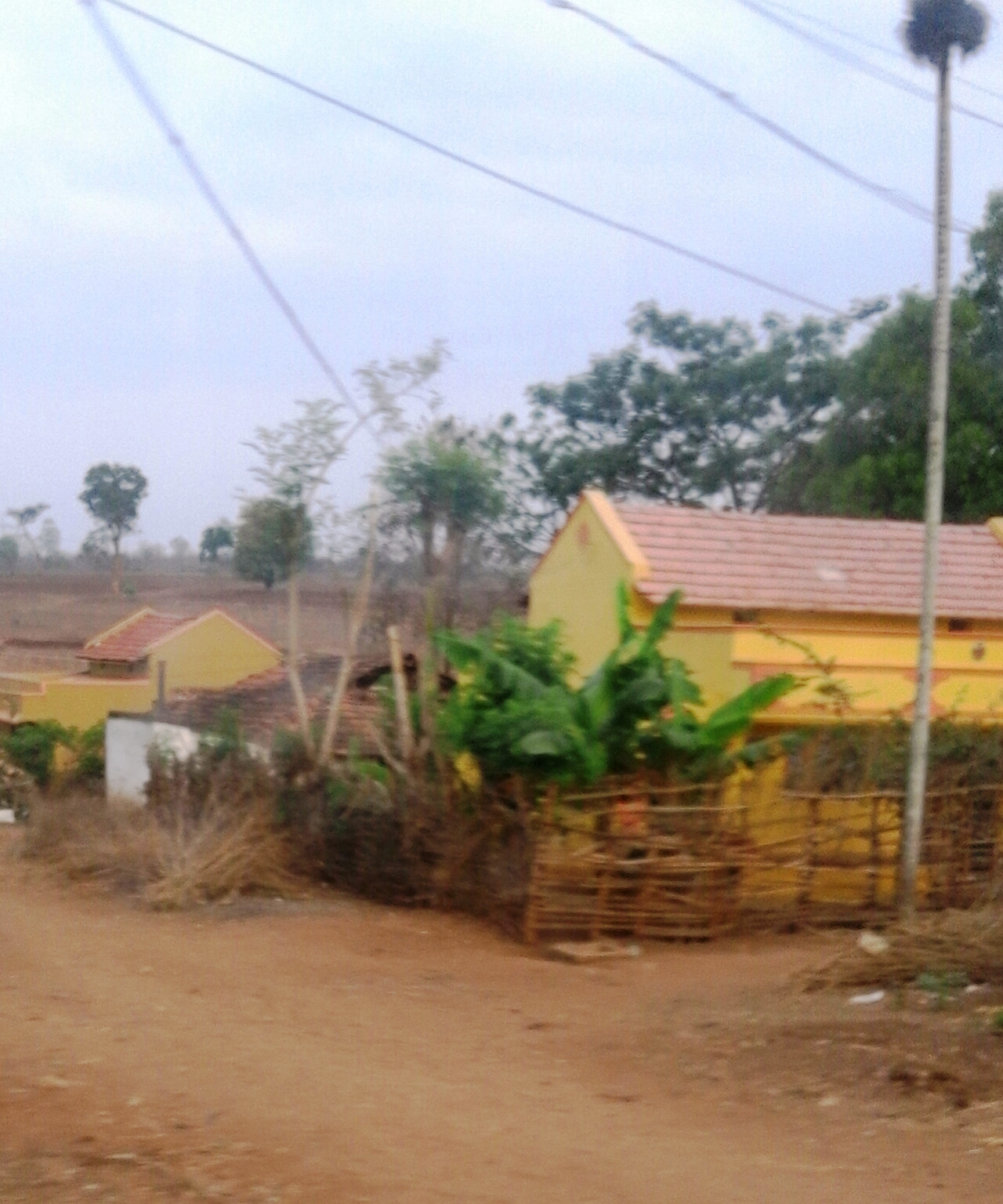
Manche Gowdanehalli
