= Mandanahalli =

Village in Karnataka, India

Coordinates: 12°09′N 76°31′E

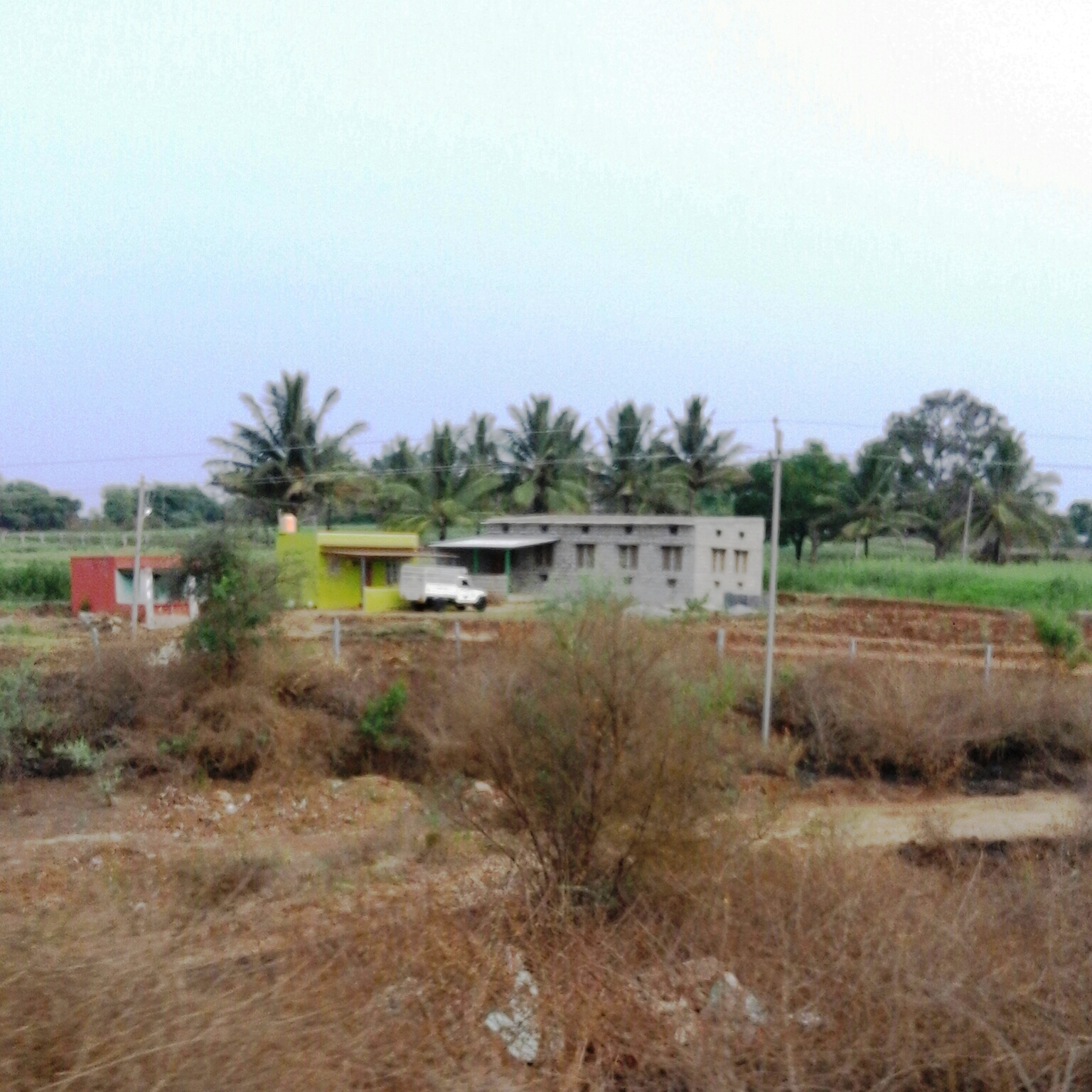
Mandanahalli, Mysore

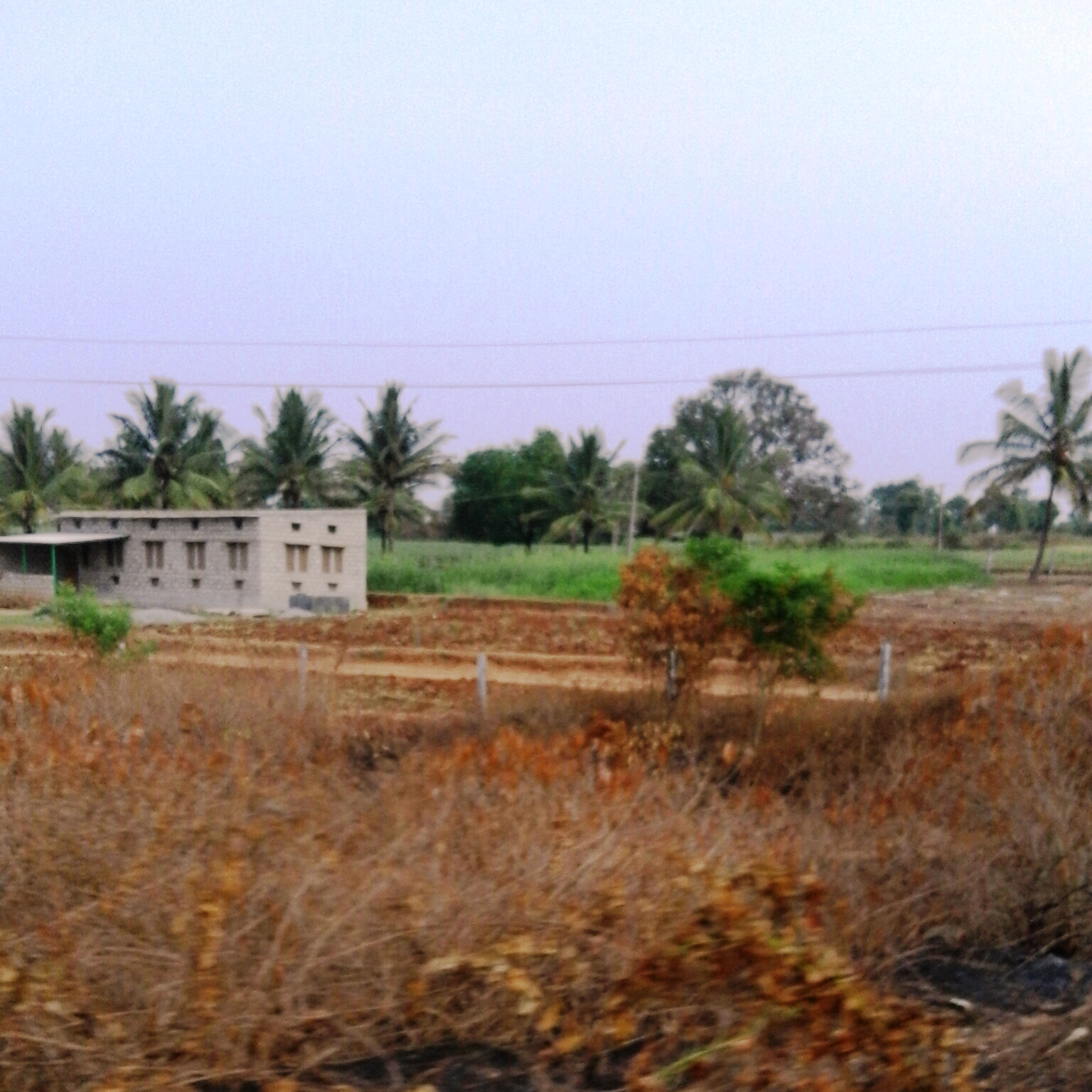
Mandanahalli village

Mandanahalli is a small village near Mysore in Karnataka state, India.

== Location ==
Mandanahalli is located on Mananthavady Road.

== Demographics ==
Mandanahalli has a population of 969 people. Children form about 12% of the total population. There are 215 houses in the village.

== Administration ==
Mandanahalli village is part of Harohalli gram panchayath in Mysore tehsil. The total area of the village is 222 hectares (550 acres).

== See also ==
- Anthara Santhe
- Daripura, Mysore
- Harohalli
- Jayapura, Mysore
