= Jayapura, Mysore =

Human settlement in Karnataka, India

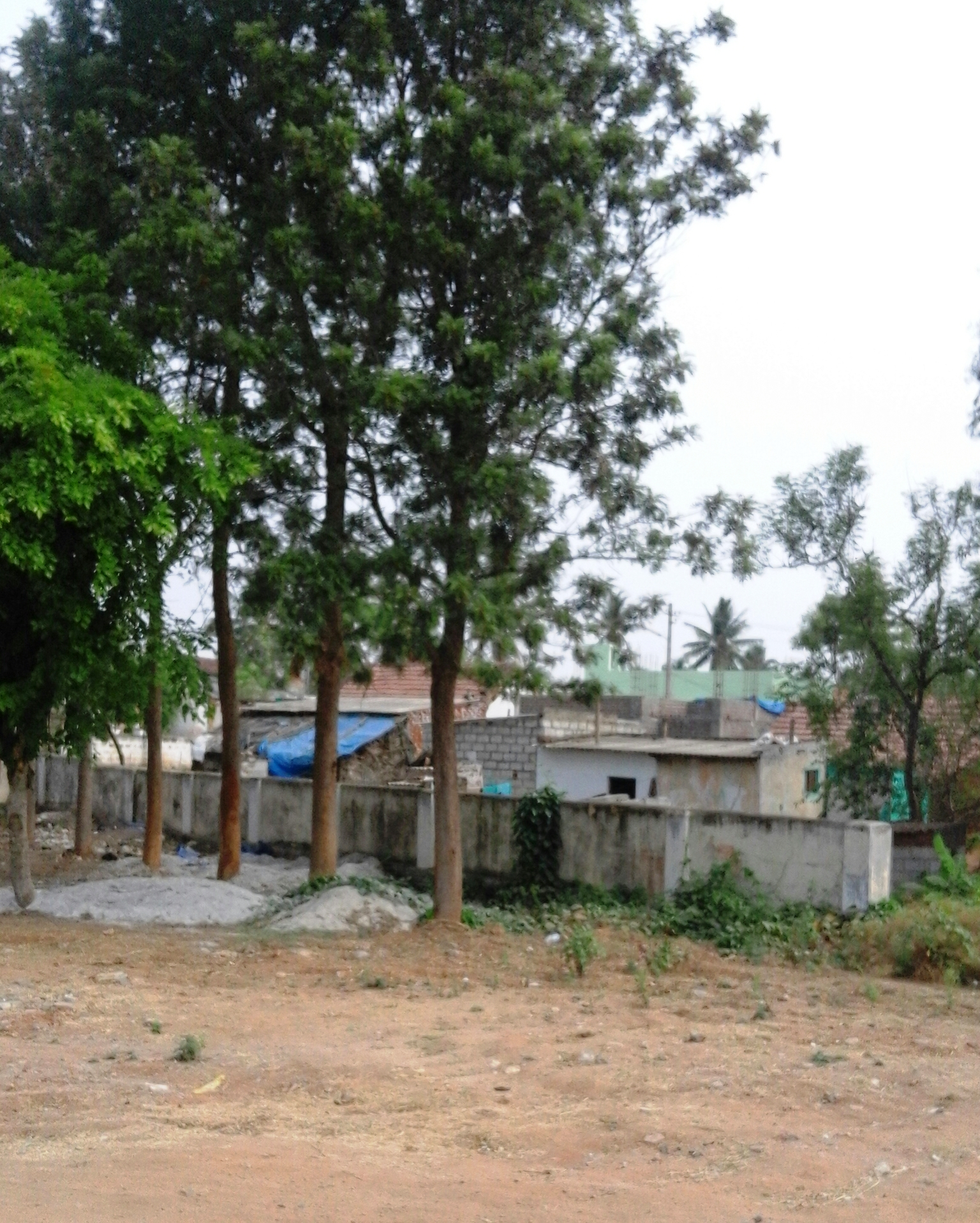
Jayapura village

Jayapura is a small village near Mysore in the state of Karnataka in India.

== Location ==
Jayapura is located in Mysore taluk of Mysore district on Mananthavady Road. The postal code of the village is 570008. The village is 17 km away from Mysore.

== Suburbs ==
Jayapura has Nanjangud on the east and H.D.Kote on the west. Srirangapatana is on the north and Hunsur is on the west. The telephone code of the village is 0821.

== See also ==
- Anthara Santhe
- Daripura, Mysore
- Harohalli
- Mandanahalli
