= Chamalapura =

- village
- Location in Karnataka, India Chamalapura (India)
- Coordinates: 12.19°N 76.45°E
- Country: India
- State: Karnataka
- District: Mysore district

Government
  - Type: Panchayat raj
  - Body: Gram panchayat

Languages
  - Official: Kannada
- Time zone: UTC+5:30 (IST)
- Telephone code: 08229
- ISO 3166 code: IN-KA
- Vehicle registration: KA
- Website: karnataka.gov.in

Chamalapura is a village situated in H D Kote Taluk (HD Kote), Mysore district, Karnataka, India.

== Location ==
The nearest city to Chamalapura is Mysore. It is situated at an aerial distance of 15 km from Mysore. The distance through road would be around 30 km from the Mysore city. The place can be reached by going towards SJCE college or All India Institute of Speech and Hearing or Bogadi. We have to then proceed on the Gaddige road. At about 25 km, we get a village called Halanahalli. We have to move forward by a kilometre or two and take a left turn. On travelling 5 km more, we reach Chamalapura.

== Thermal power station ==
Government of Karnataka is trying to build a thermal power station in this rich soil area. This area is very near to Nagarahole National Park and Kabini river. Environmentalists are arguing that this project will surely pollute the surrounding flora and fauna. The people of Chamalapura are not ready to give up their lands. Citizens of mysore are also against this project. But the Government of Karnataka is backing this project by stating that it will generate electricity and make up for the shortage faced by Karnataka state. But the people against this project argue that Transmission Loss and robbery of electricity amounts to 40%. If this loss is controlled effectively, then there is no need for thermal power station.

The Government has argued that the land is barren and not fit for cultivation. Hence a project in this place is favourable. But going by the photos published in the newspapers, it can be well concluded that the land is very much fertile.
