= Agasanahundi =

- village
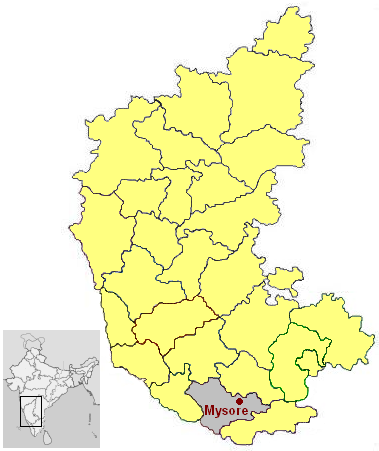
- Agasanahundi is in Mysore district
- Interactive map of Agasanahundi
- Coordinates: 12.1056°N 76.2051°E
- Country: India
- State: Karnataka
- District: Mysore
- Talukas: Heggadadevankote

Government
  - Body: Village Panchayat

Languages
  - Official: Kannada
- Time zone: UTC+5:30 (IST)
- ISO 3166 code: IN-KA
- Vehicle registration: KA
- Nearest city: Mysore
- Civic agency: Village Panchayat
- Website: karnataka.gov.in

Agasanahundi is a village in the southern state of Karnataka, India. It is located in the Heggadadevankote taluk of Mysore district.

== See also ==
- Mysore
- Districts of Karnataka
