= D.B.Kuppe =

Dodda Byrankuppe D.B.Kuppe
- Interactive map of Dodda Byrankuppe
- Coordinates: 12.4676919°N 76.2652909°E
- Country: India
- State: Karnataka
- District: Mysore
- Time zone: UTC+05:30 (IST)
- PIN: 571114

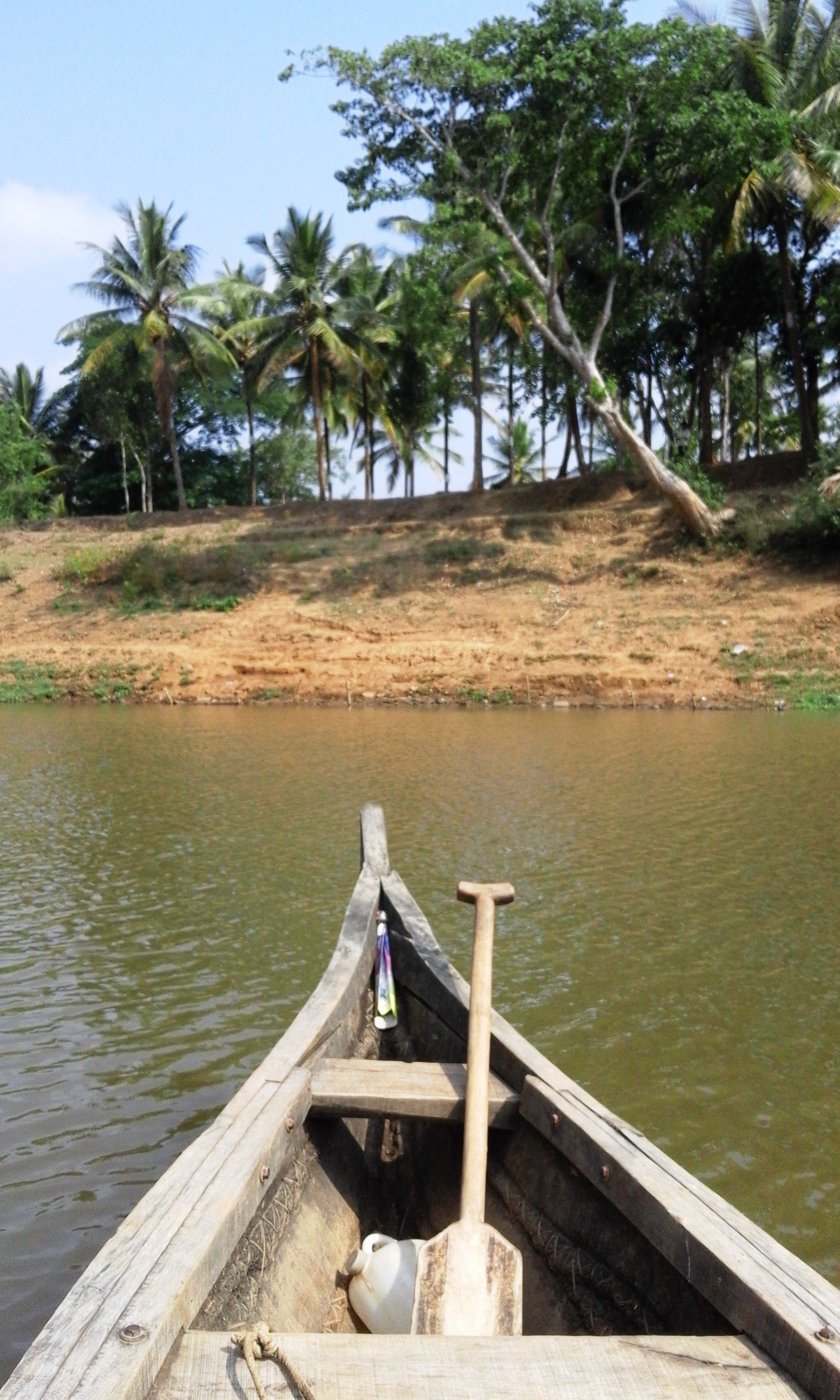
Machur ferry takes you to Kerala

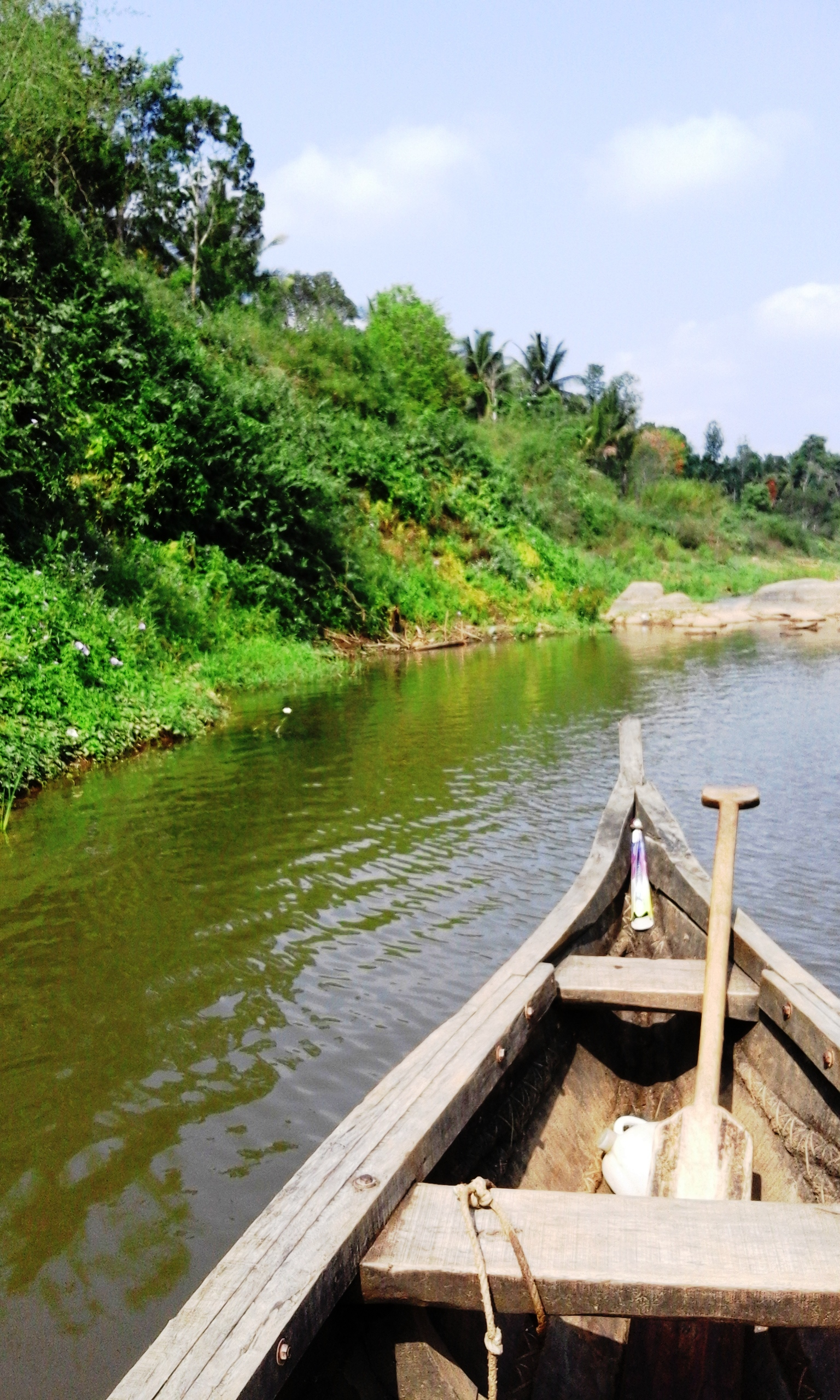
Kabanigiri in Pulpally, Kerala is the other side of Kabani river.

D.B. Kuppe or Doddabyrankuppe is a small village on the banks of the Kabini River in Mysore district, Karnataka state, India. It falls under the jurisdiction of Heggadadevana kote taluk.

== Location ==
The village has no effective road access to Karnataka state. Most of the villagers depend on Mananthavady town, 16 km away in Kerala state, for their day-to-day needs and employment. The Kerala Government has organized regular bus services to the village from Mananthavady.

== Administration ==
The village is administered by a panchayath. It belongs to Mysore district.

== Tourism ==
The village has good tourist potential as it is in the very middle of forest area. A large number of devotees come to visit the Gundara Dargah at Machur. The Veda Gowda tribe of Bavali area celebrate the Moori Abba or Ori Abba festival on the new moon day after Deepavali. Centuries ago, this tribe fled from Chitradurga district because of the persecution of Tippu Sultan. The purpose of this celebration is the prosperity of their crops. The festival begins with nadi Pooja and a bullock race is also conducted. The bullocks are paraded before the Sree Basaveshwara Temple at Dodda Bairankuppa which is only 10 km away from the Kerala town of Pulpally.

== Paddy cultivation ==
There are numerous of paddy fields in the village. The Kabini River flows through DB Kuppe Village, occasionally floods houses on the shore.

== Nearby villages ==
- Heggadadevanakote
- Manuganahalli 11.3 km
- Hampapura 14.6 km
- N. Belthur 15.2 km
- Hyrige 22.8 km

== Image Gallery ==
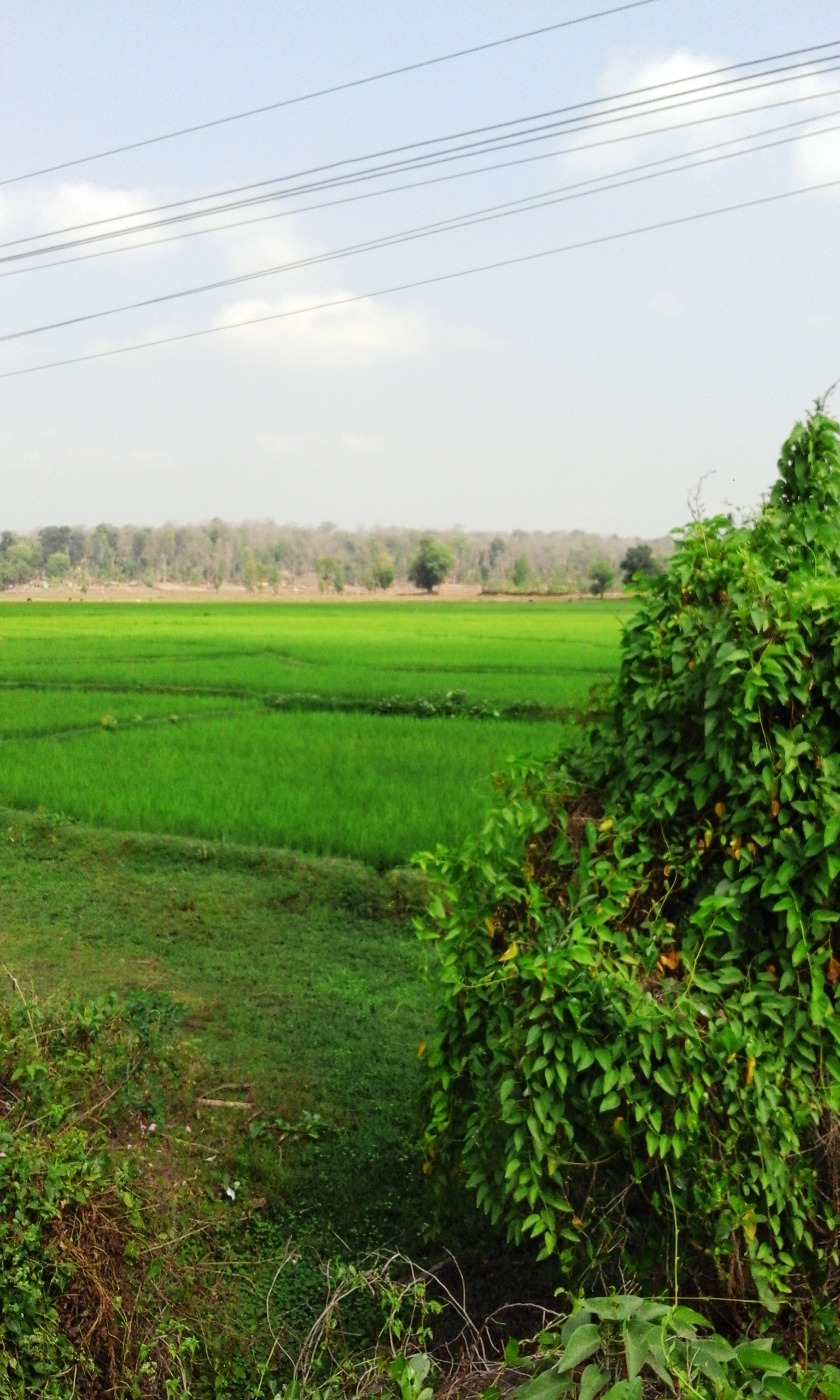
Machur village

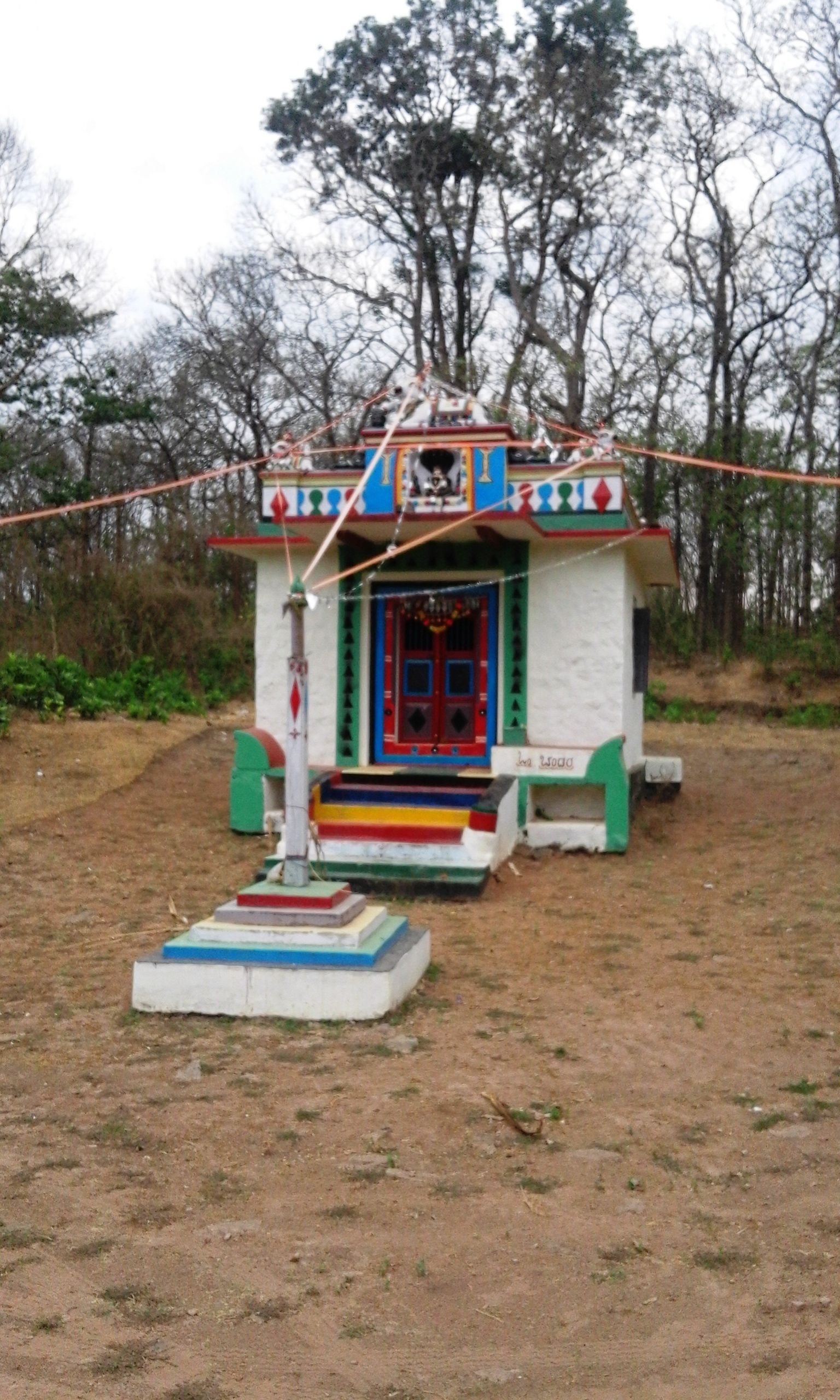
Village temple

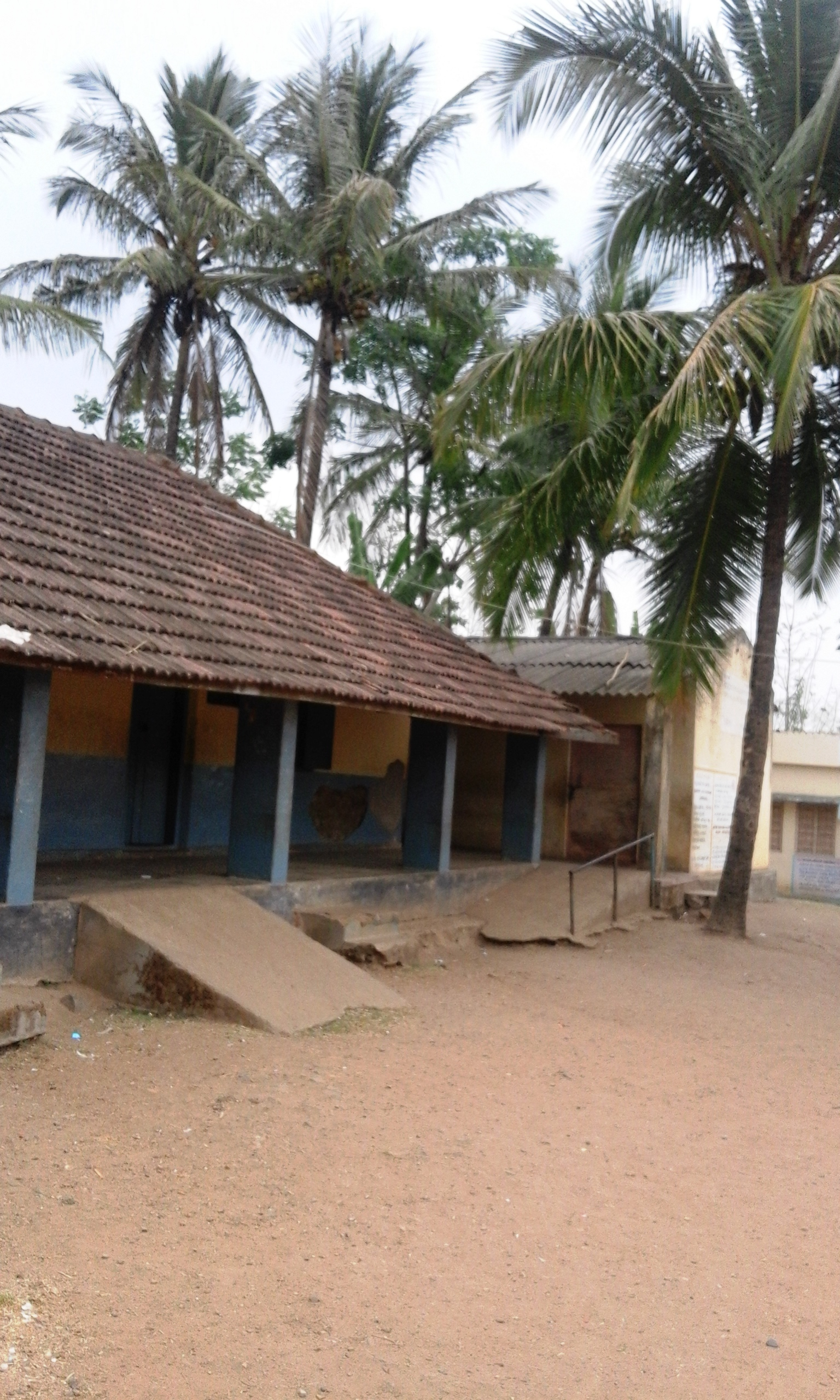
Village school

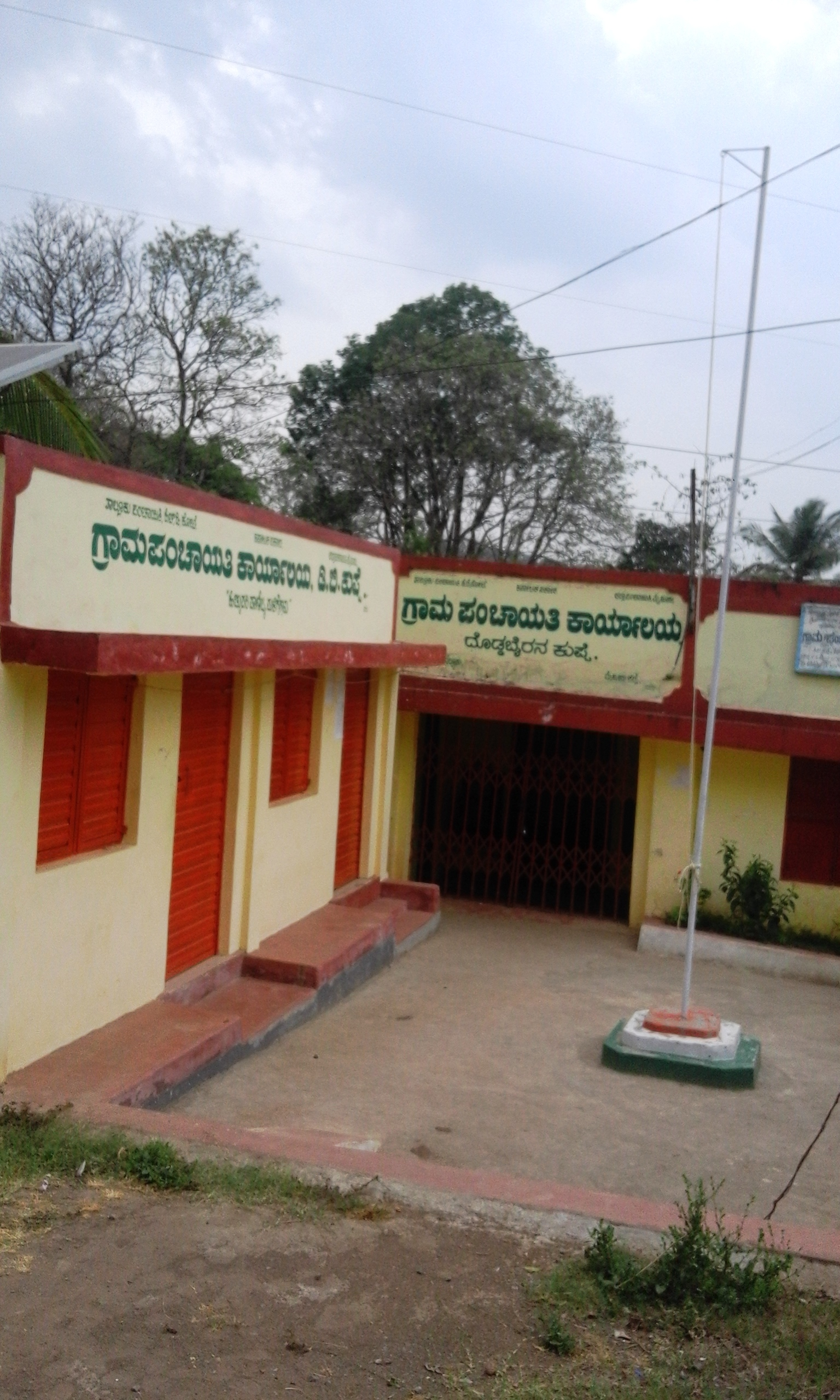
D.B.Kuppe

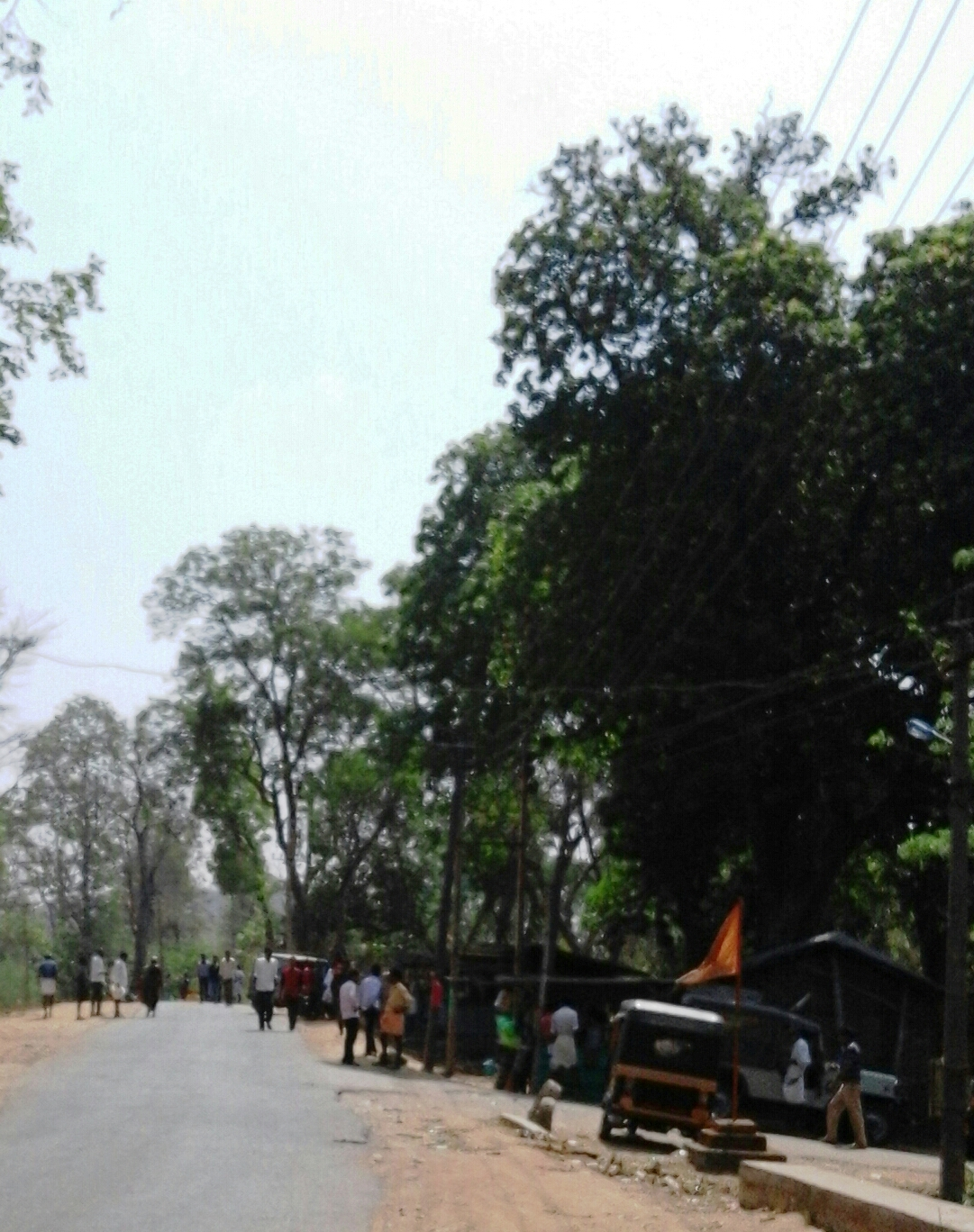
Machur Town

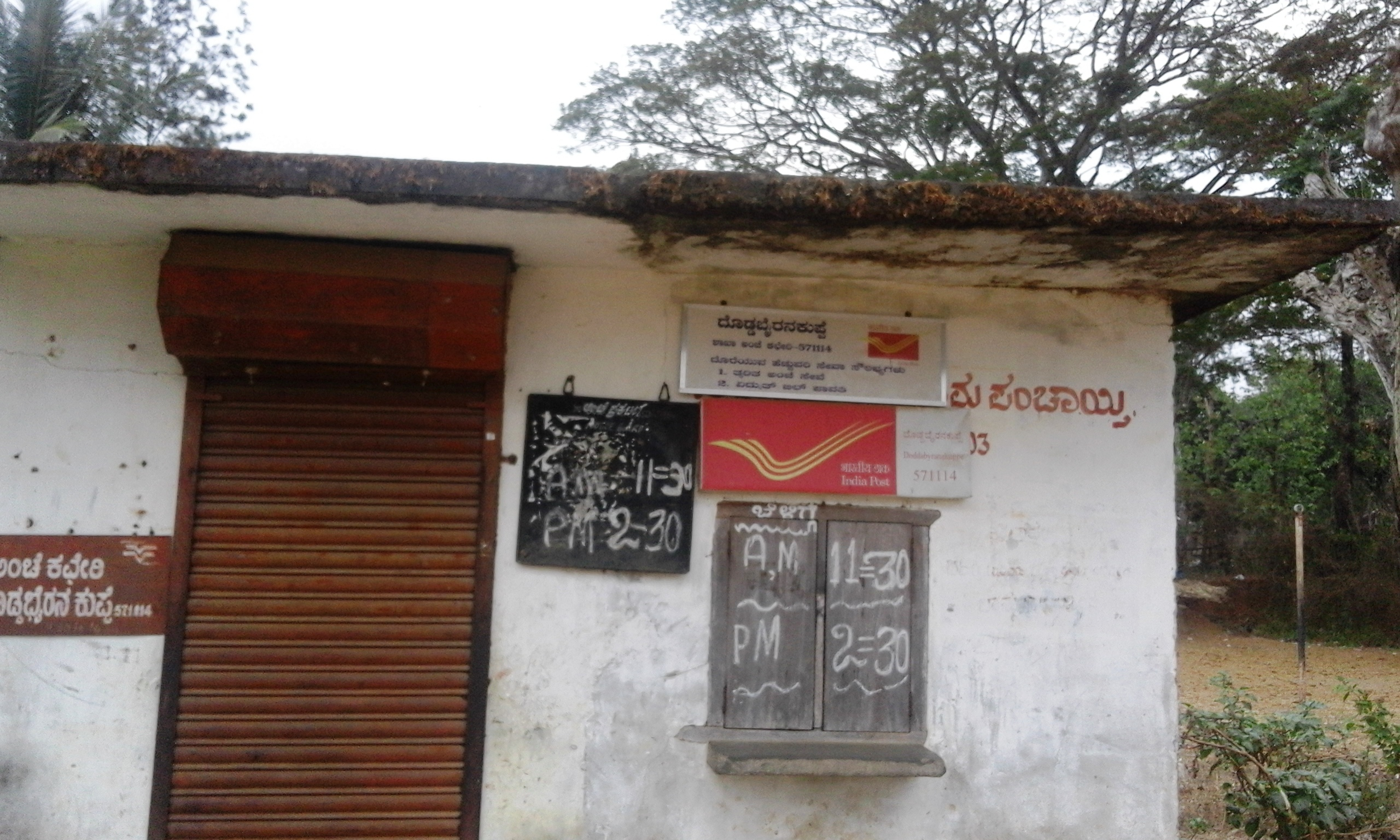
Post Office

== See also ==
- Heggadadevana kote
- Mananthavady
- Balle Elephant Camp
- Anthara Santhe
