= Daripura, Mysore =

Coordinates: 12°13′N 76°34′E

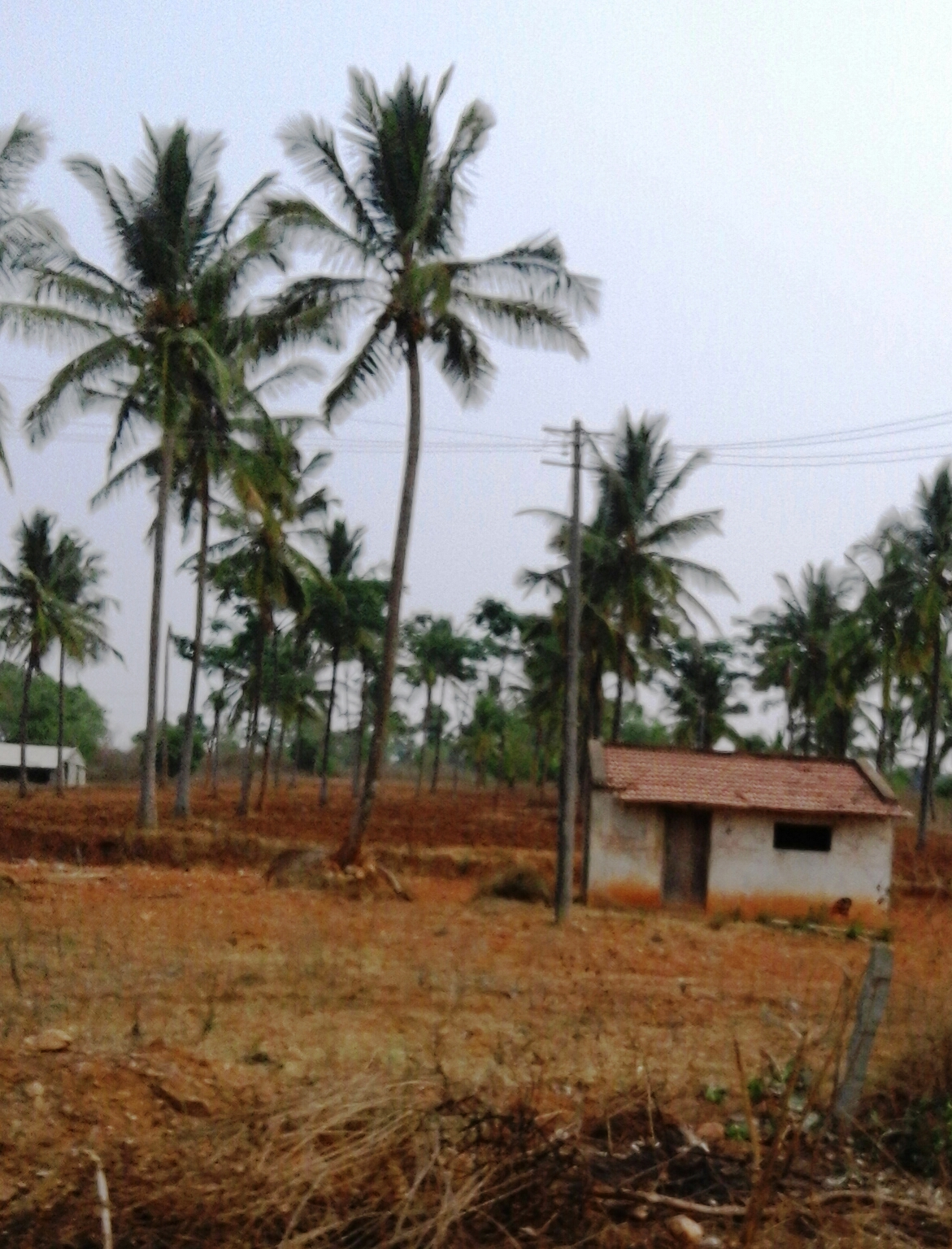
Daripura, Mysore

Daripura is a small village in Mysore, Karnataka province, India.

== Location ==
Daripura is located on Mananthavady Road in Mysore district.

== Demographics ==
Daripura has a population of 739 people. Children make up of 10 percent of the population. The literacy rate is 70%. The female literacy is only 62%.

== Administration ==
Daripura village is administrated by a Sarpanch elected by the villagers.

== Image Gallery ==
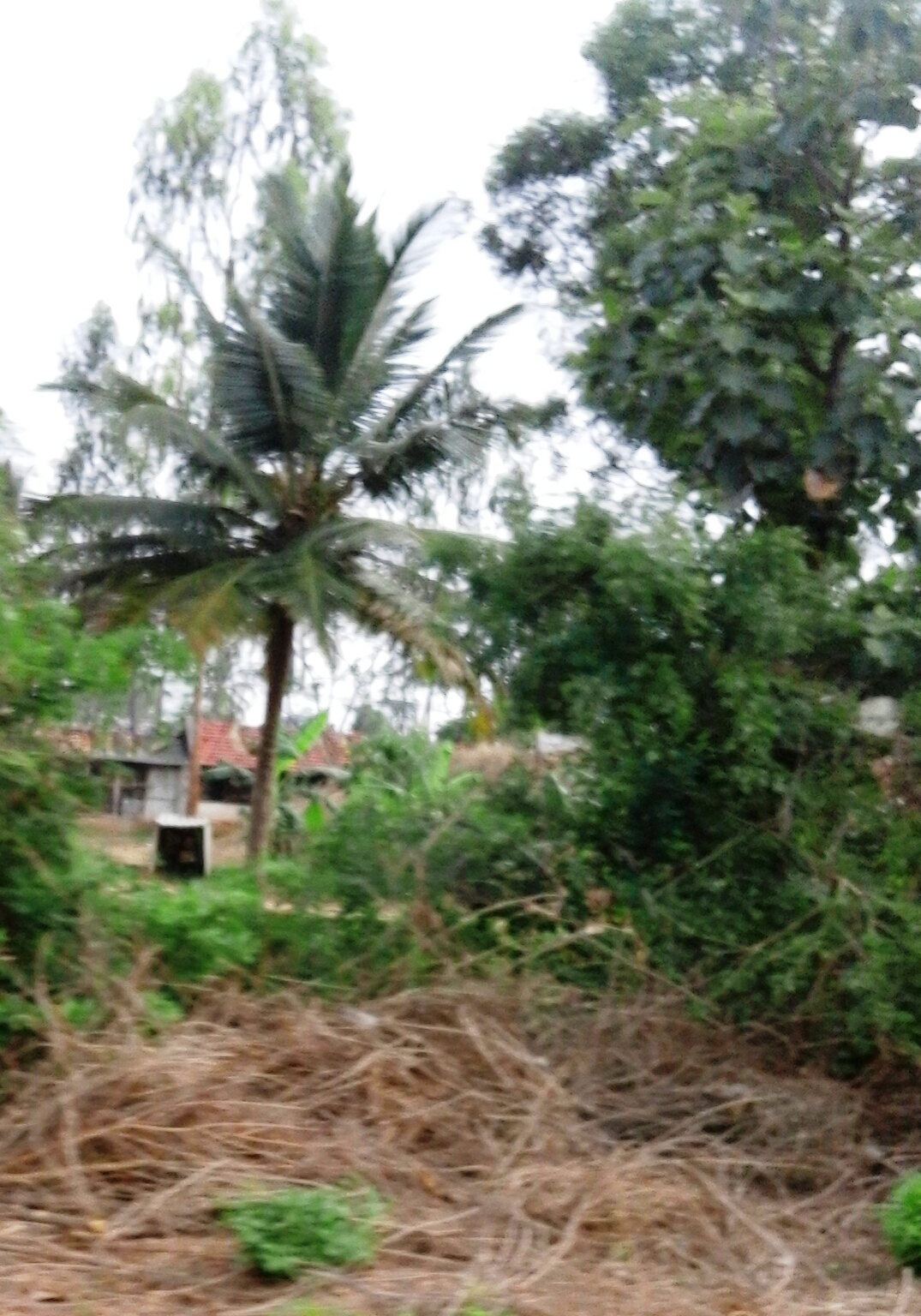
Daripura

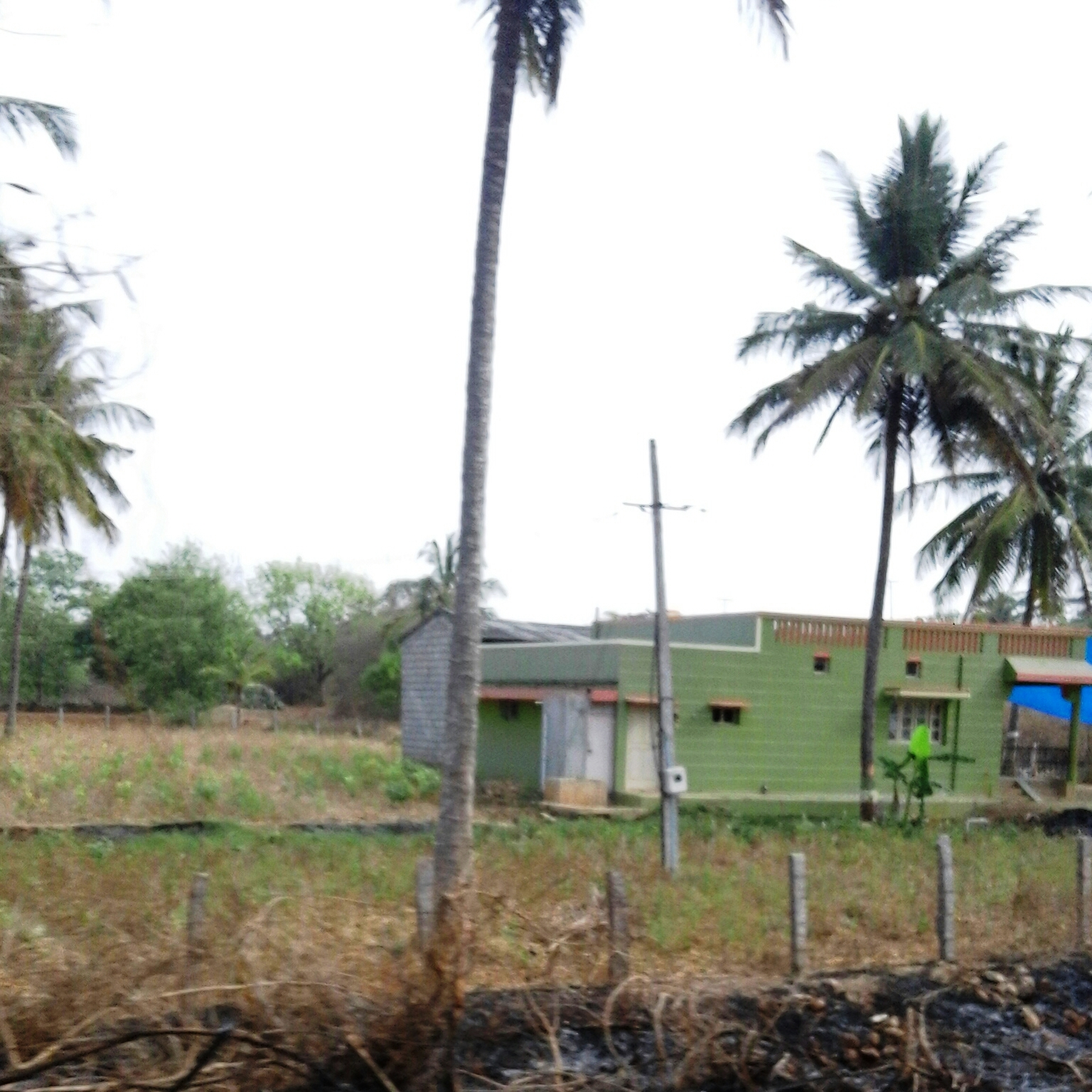
Daripura
