= Harohalli =

- Town
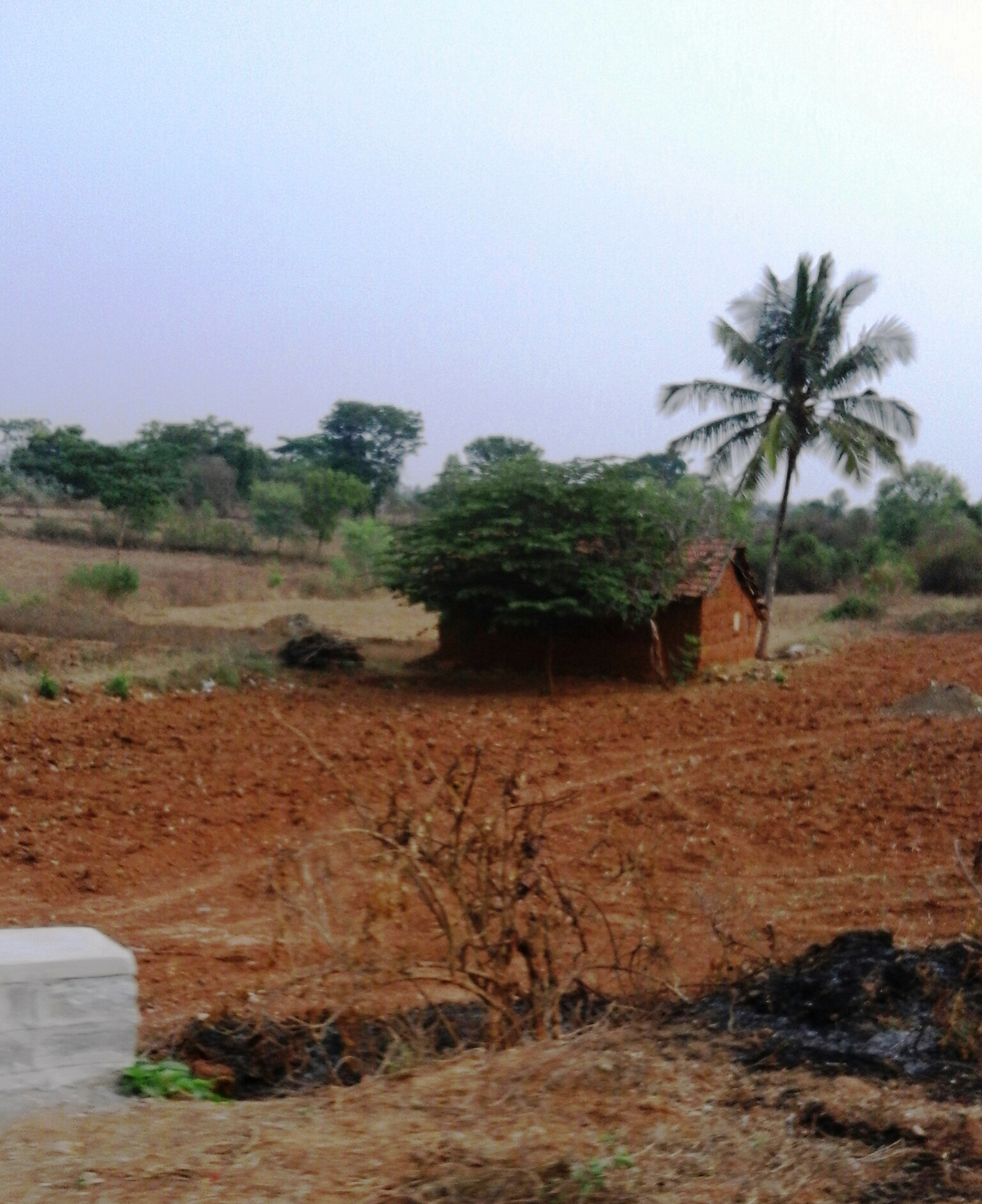
- Harohalli, Karnataka
- Interactive map of Harohalli
- Coordinates: 12.680111°N 77.469868°E
- Country: India
- State: Karnataka
- District: Bengaluru South
- Talukas: Harohalli

Government
  - Body: Town Panchayath

Area
  - Total: 19.32 km^{2} (7.46 sq mi)

Population (2011)
  - Total: 20,840
  - Density: 1,079/km^{2} (2,794/sq mi)

Languages
  - Official: Kannada
- Time zone: UTC+5:30 (IST)
- PIN: 562112
- ISO 3166 code: IN-KA
- Vehicle registration: KA-42
- Website: http://www.harohallitown.mrc.gov.in

Harohalli is a Town in the southern state of Karnataka, India. It is the headquarter of Harohalli taluk of Bengaluru South District in Karnataka.

== Demographics ==
As of the 2001 India census, Harohalli had a population of 7,888, with 4,054 males and 3,834 females.

== KIADB Harohalli Industrial Area ==
The Karnataka Industrial Areas Development Board (KIADB) approved layout dates for phase 1 of the Harohalli industrial area on 3 October 2005. Consequently, phase 2 of the project was approved on 19 August 2008. KIADB’s proposal is to build a multi-product industrial park encompassing about 904.86 hectares as part of combined development of phase II and III of Harohalli industrial park.

== See also ==
- Mysore
- Districts of Karnataka
