= Heggadadevanakote =

Heggadadevana kote H.D Kote
- Town
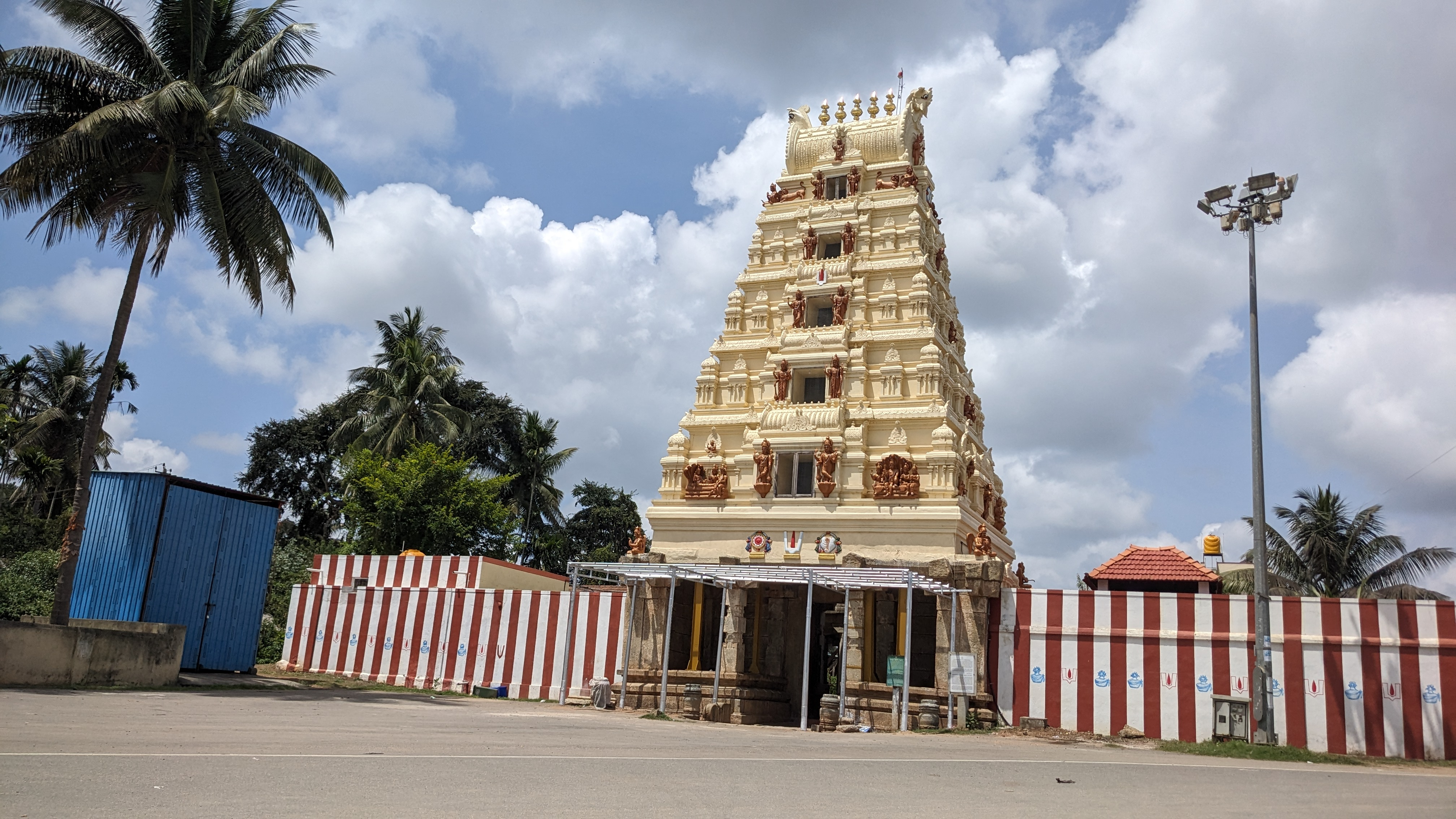
- Sri Varadaraja Swamy Temple, Heggadedevana Kote

- Location in Karnataka, India Heggadadevana kote (India)
- Coordinates: 12.088°N 76.328°E
- Country: India
- State: Karnataka
- District: Mysore
- Elevation: 694 m (2,277 ft)

Population (2011)
  - Total: 14,313

Languages
  - Official: Kannada
- Time zone: UTC+5:30 (IST)
- PIN: 571 114
- Telephone code: 08228
- Vehicle registration: KA-45
- Website: www.hdkotetown.mrc.gov.in

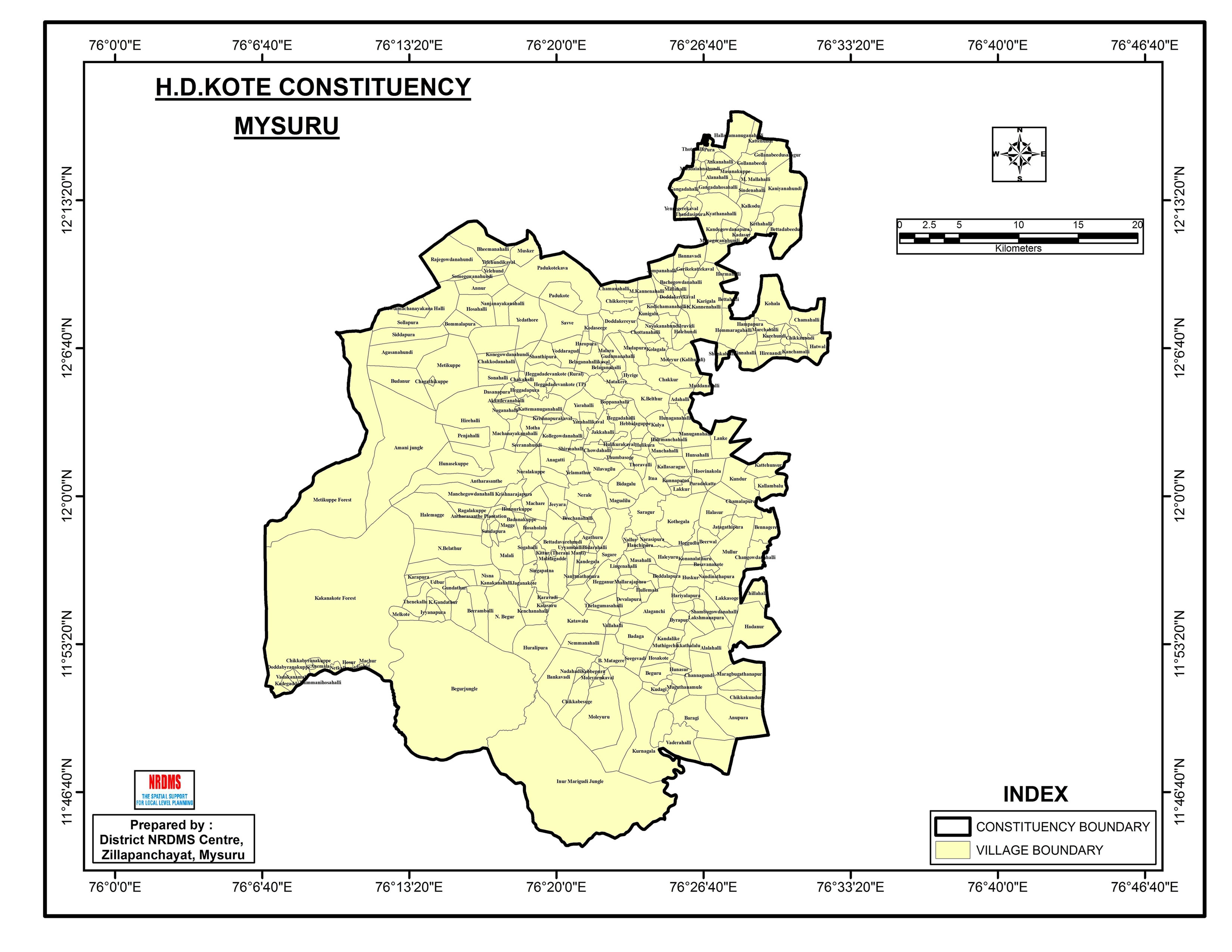
Taluk boundary same as Assembly Constituency as per 2011 Census before creation of Sargur Taluk

Heggadadevanakote or H.D.Kote is a town and a taluk headquarters in Mysore district in the Indian state of Karnataka. Kakana kote forest lies in Heggadadevana kote taluk. H.D Kote city is divided into 13 wards for which elections are held every 5 years.

== Demographics ==
As of 2011, has population of 14,313 of which 7,184 are males while 7,129 are females as per report released by Census India 2011.

The population of children aged 0-6 is 1662 which is 11.61 % of total population of Heggadadevankote (TP). In Heggadadevankote Town Panchayat, the female sex ratio is 992 against state average of 973. Moreover the child sex ratio in Heggadadevankote is around 962 compared to Karnataka state average of 948. The literacy rate of Heggadadevankote city is 79.53 % higher than the state average of 75.36 %. In Heggadadevankote, male literacy is around 85.09 % while the female literacy rate is 73.95 %.

Heggadadevankote Town Panchayat has total administration over 3,336 houses to which it supplies basic amenities like water and sewerage. It is also authorize to build roads within Town Panchayat limits and impose taxes on properties coming under its jurisdiction.

== Agriculture ==
H D Kote has four reservoirs: the Kabini, Nugu, Hebbal and Taraka reservoirs. Ironically, however, agriculture in this taluk is rain-fed mainly because the government has failed to harness the capacity of the reservoirs. Barring the Kabini reservoir, the other reservoirs are always dry. As a result, farmers who could otherwise raise three crops are able to hardly raise one and are perennially in debt. This is one of the main reasons for the economic backwardness of the taluk and distress migration to cities is common.

== Taraka Lift Irrigation Project ==
The Taraka Lift Irrigation Project was envisaged with a view to alleviating the miseries of the farmers of this taluk. The project entails pumping water 6 km from the Kabini reservoir into the Taraka reservoir; it was completed in 1983. Cauvery Neeravari Nigam Limited is in charge of this project and claims that 80% of the project is complete. The lift irrigation project was expected to be completed by January 2007.

The Taraka reservoir was in the news in October 2006 as one of the crest gates of the reservoirs breached leading to a major flooding of the villages downstream. This resulted in a major loss of animal life, agricultural produce and property though there were no human deaths.

== Handpost Junction ==
Handpost Junction or Yerahalli is an important road junction of Heggadevana Kote connecting Mysore and Kerala state. This is a separate township attached to H.D.Kote main town.

== Image Gallery ==
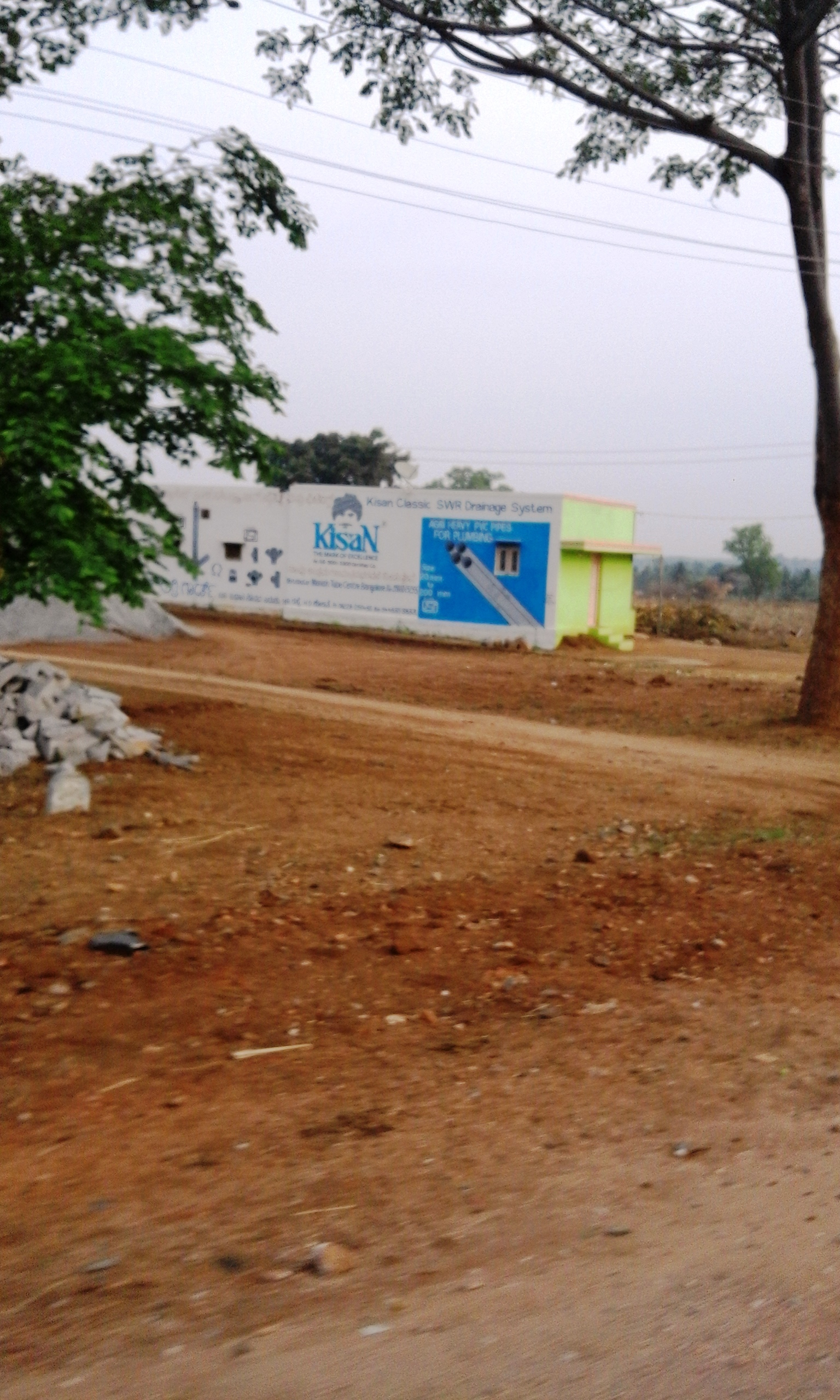
Boppanahalli village

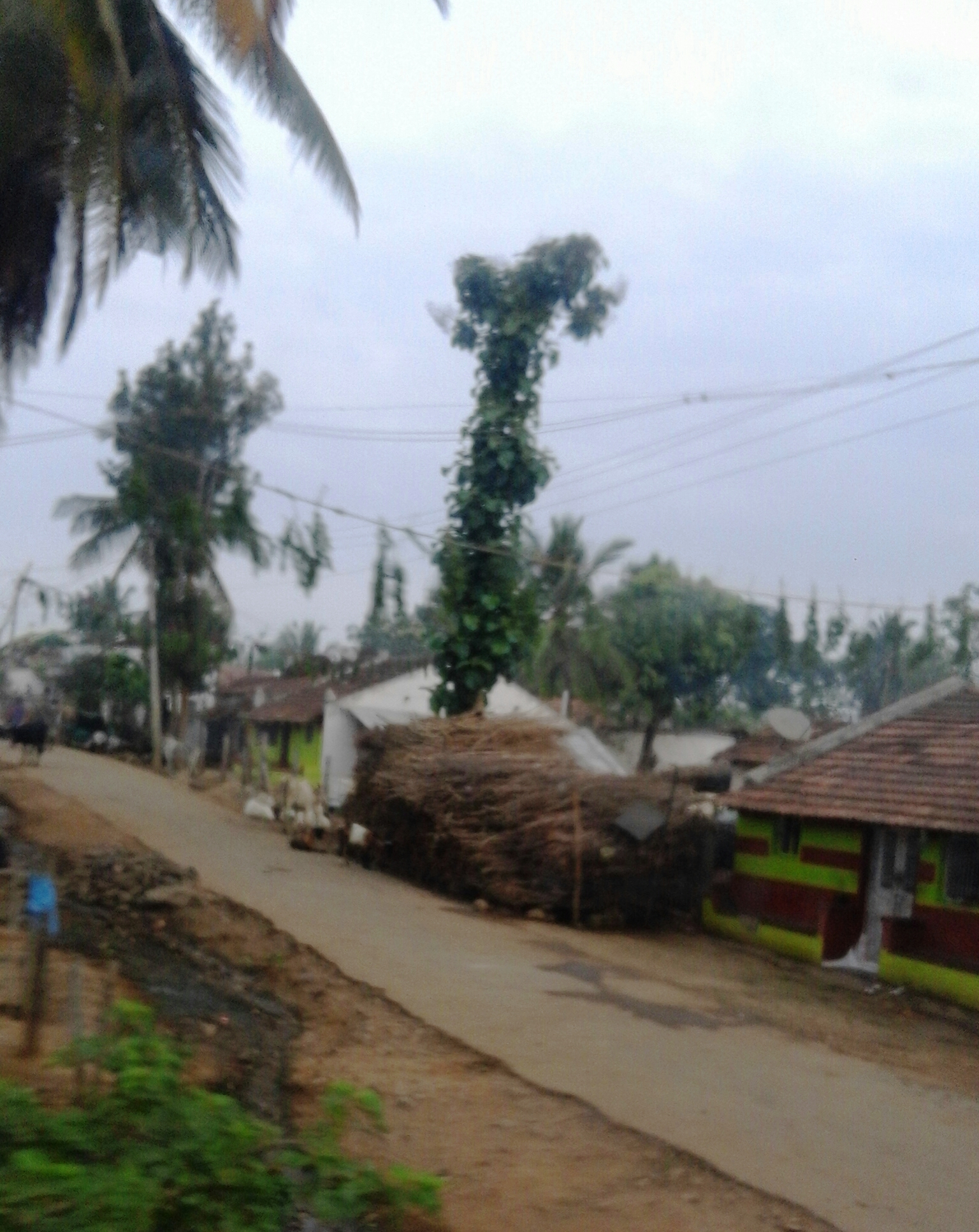
Krishnaraja village

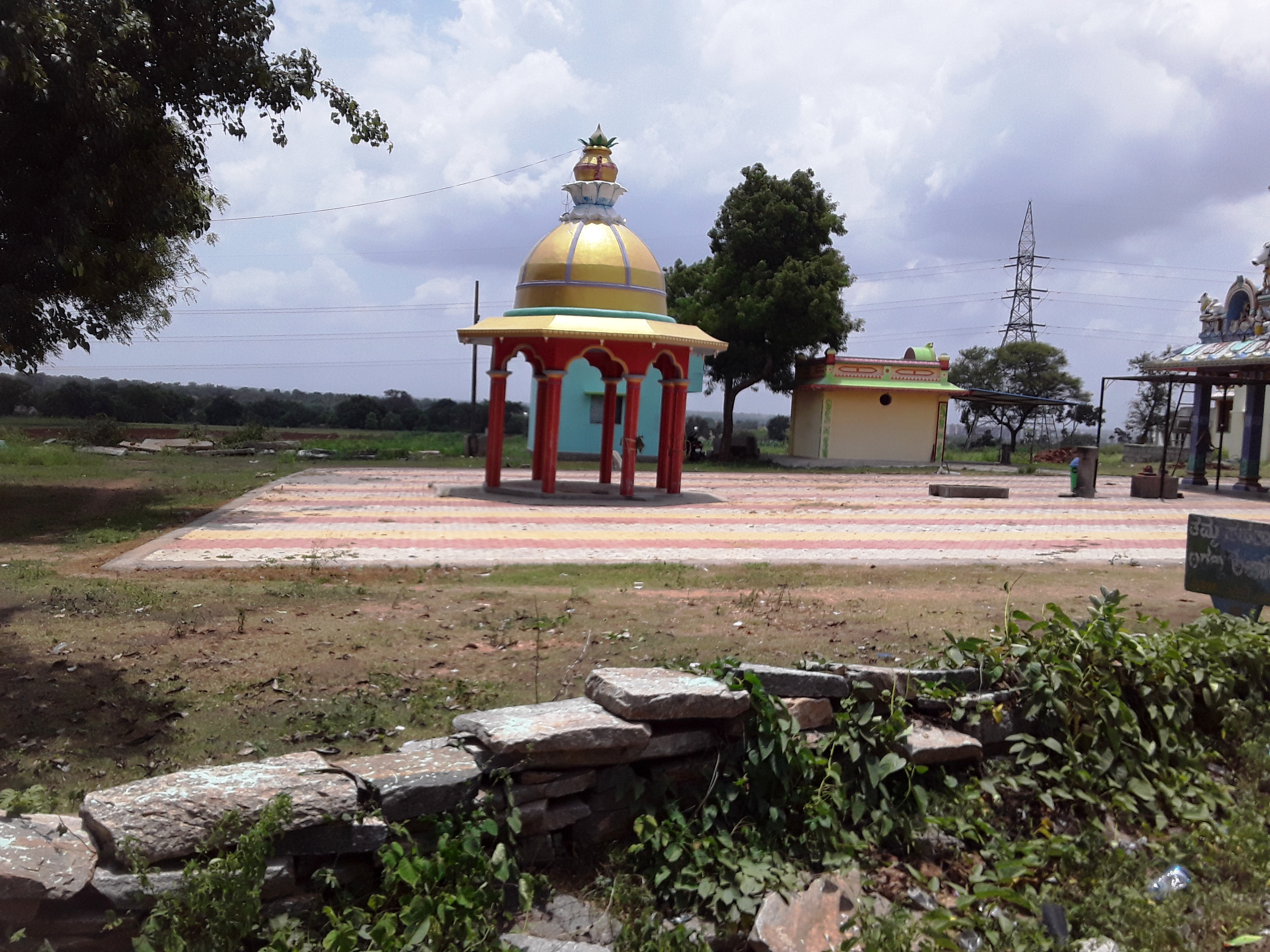
Doddahundi village

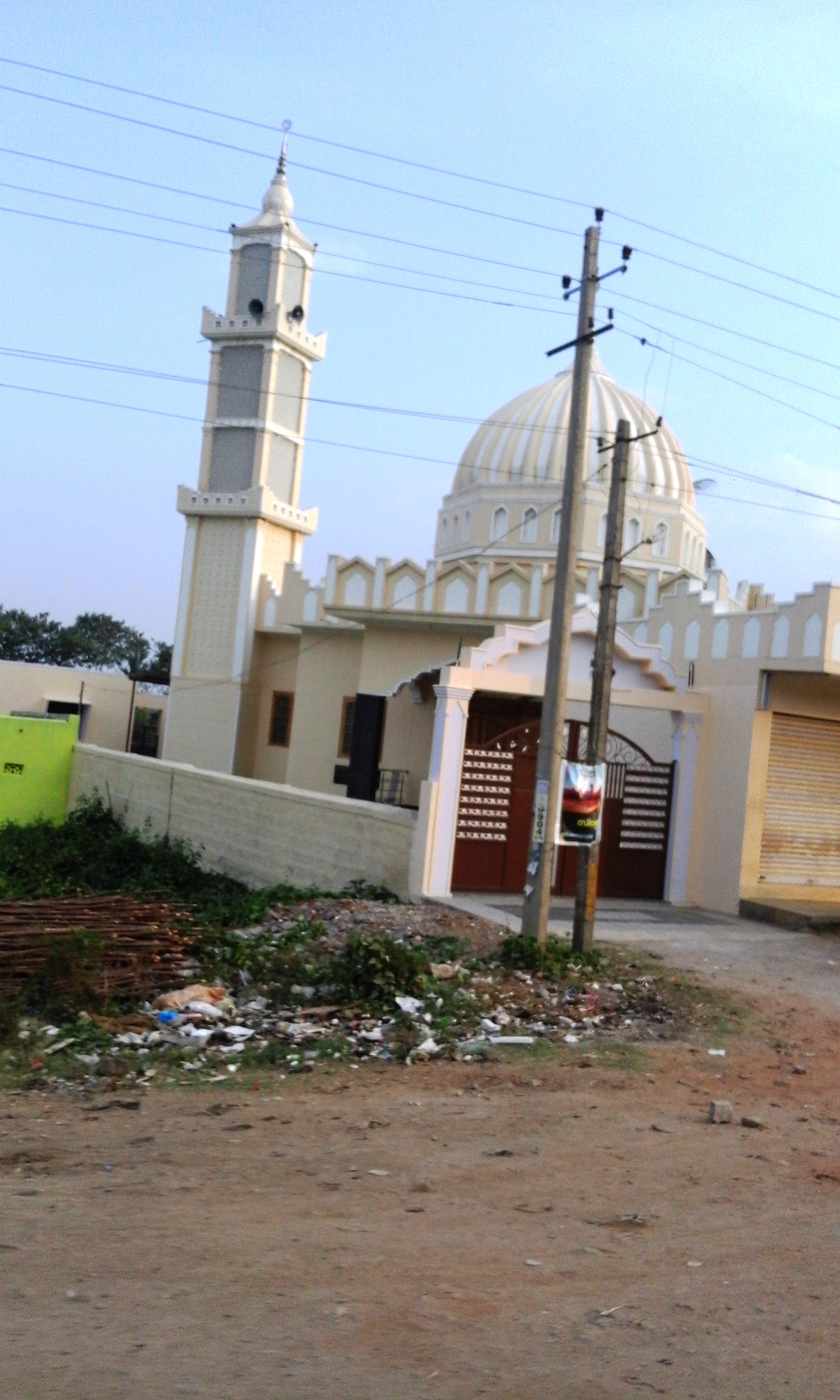
Mosque in Handpost junction

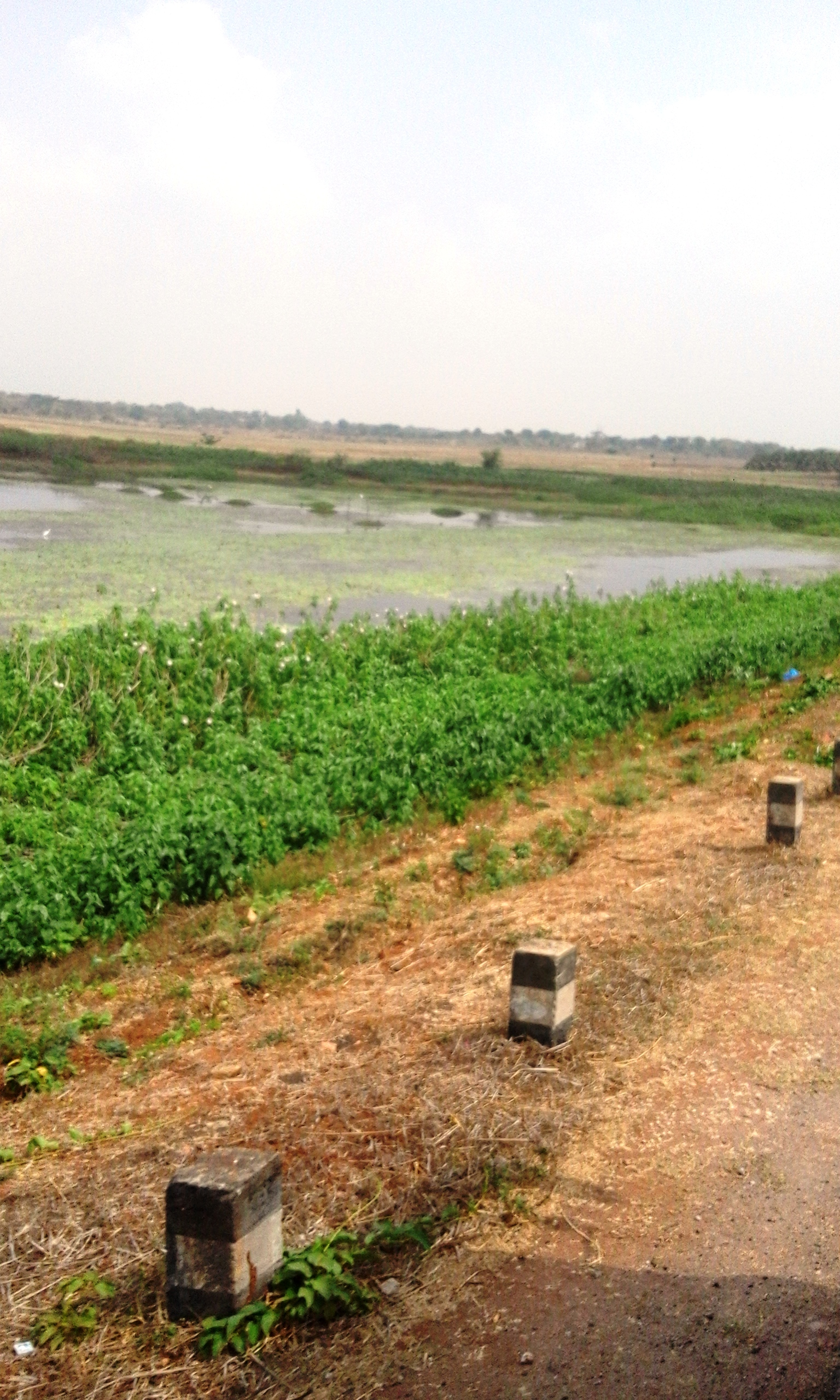
Mysore road from H.D. Kote

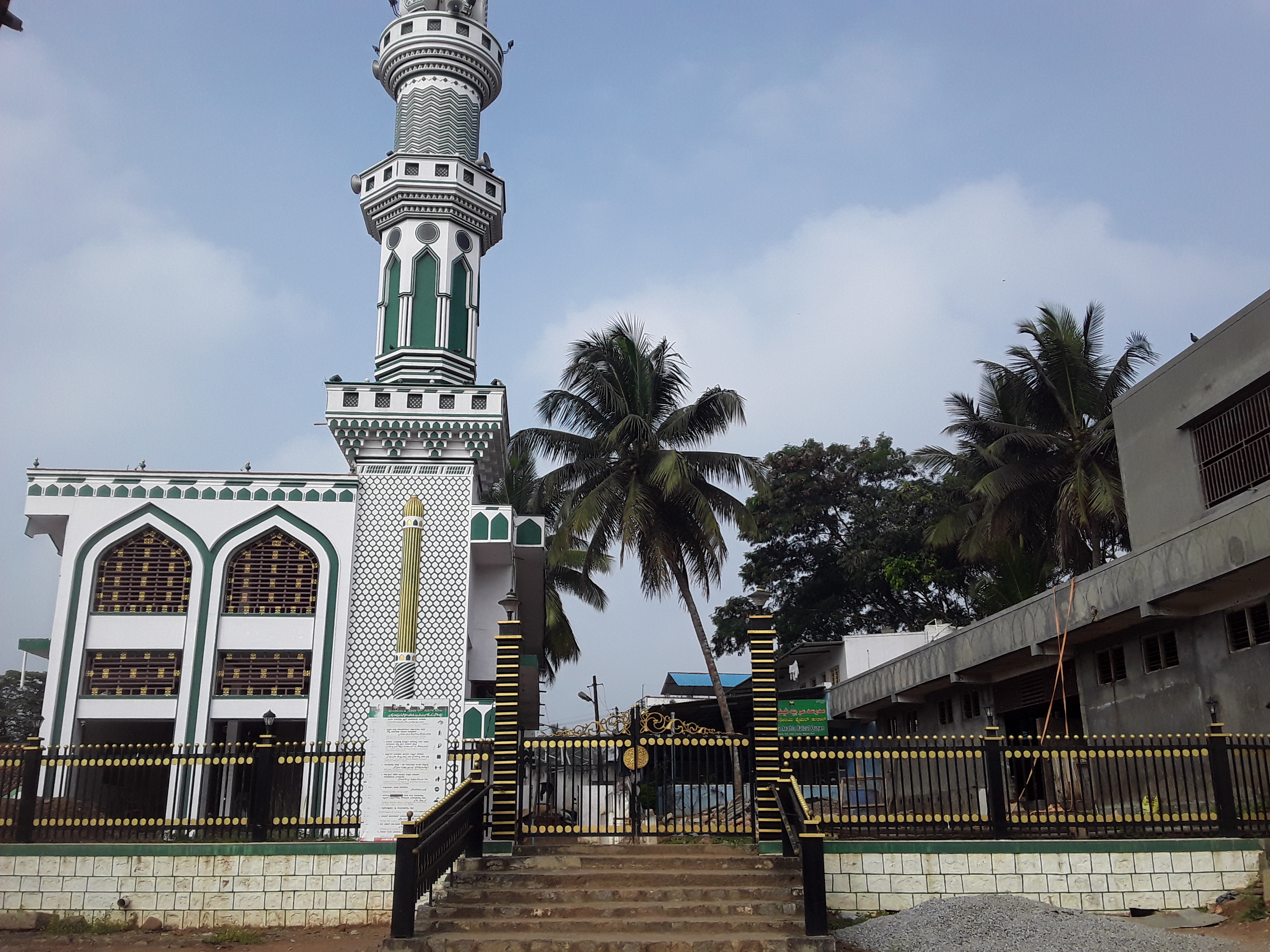
Juma Masjidh near Bus Station

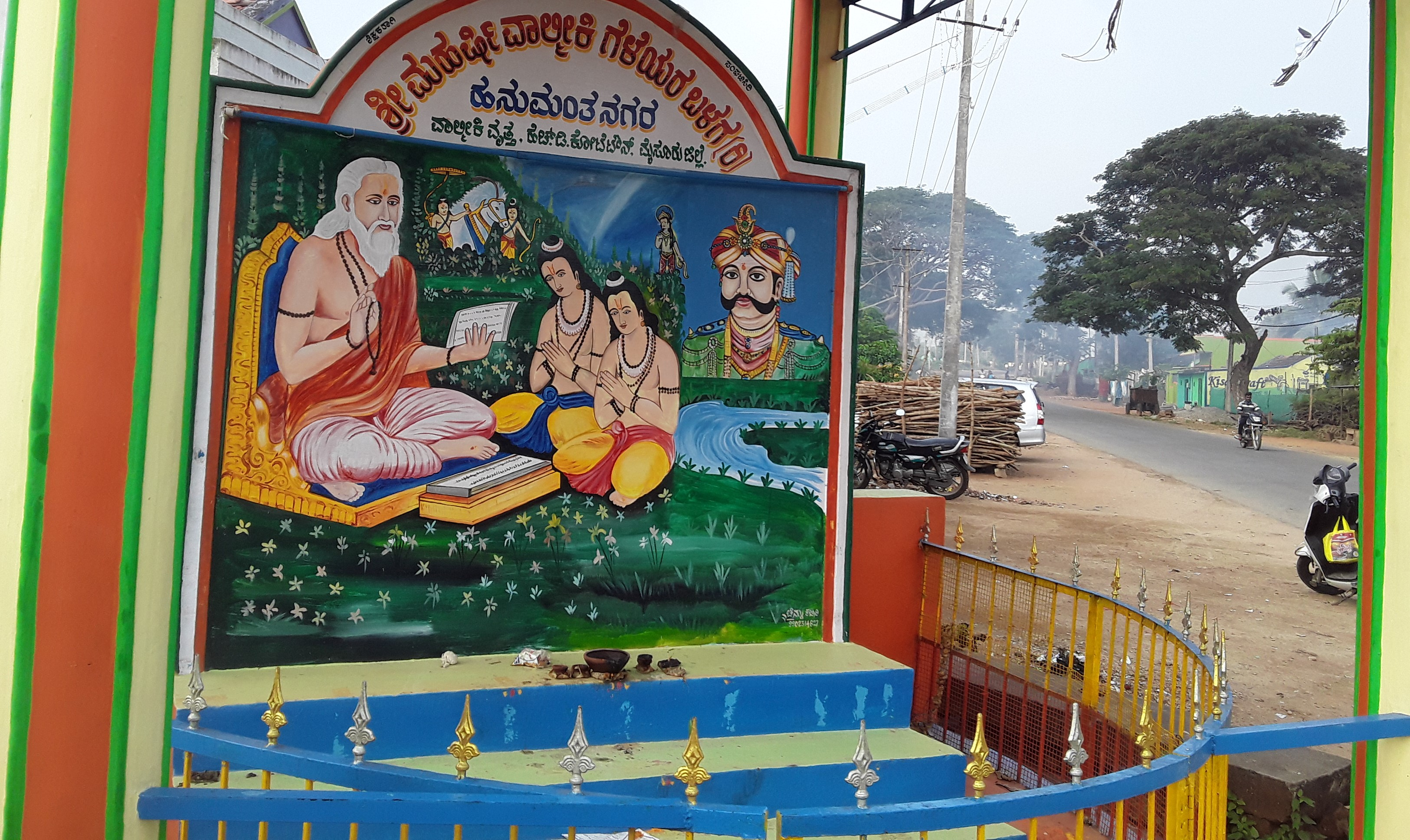
Temple gate near KSRTC depot

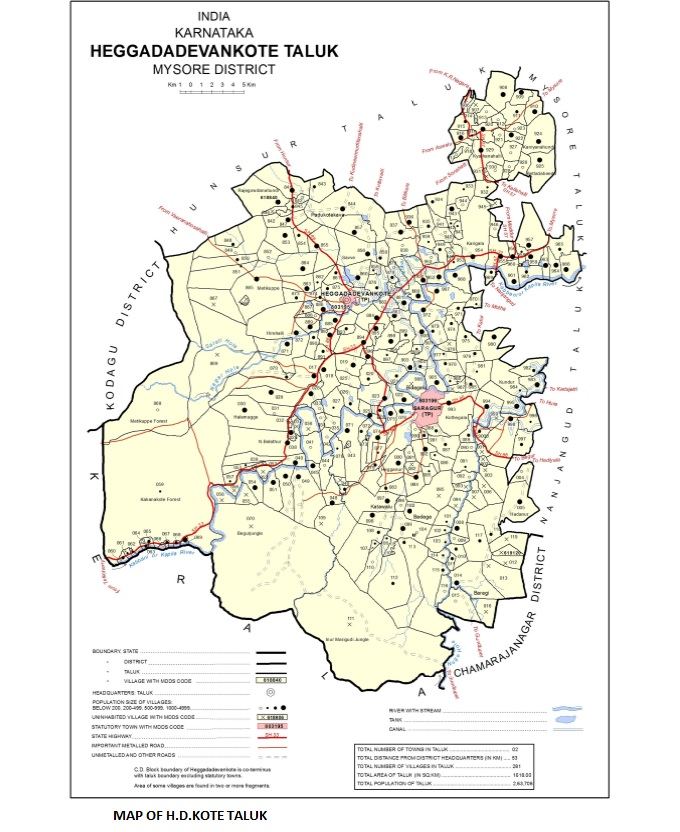
Heggadadevanakote Taluk boundary before creation of Sargur Taluk

== See also ==
- D.B.Kuppe
- Mananthavady Road
