= Saraswathipuram =

Saraswathipuram, Mysore Kukrahalli
- Saraswathipuram
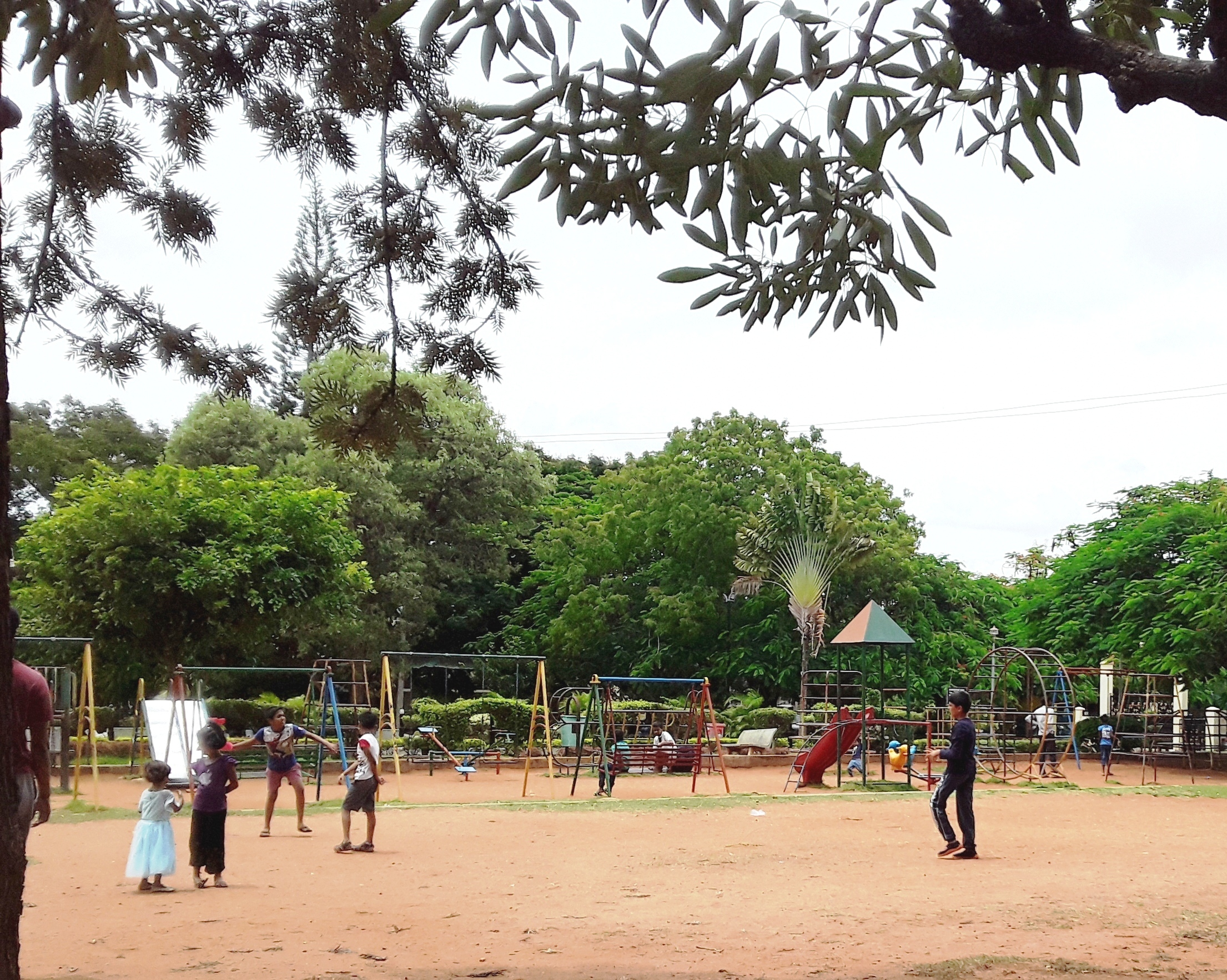
- Nickname: Saraswathipuram
- Interactive map of Saraswathipuram, Mysore
- Coordinates: 12.29939°N 76.62476°E
- Country: India
- State: Karnataka
- District: Mysore
- Time zone: UTC+5:30 (IST)
- PIN: 570009

Chandramowleshwara Temple

Saraswathipuram is a residential suburb of Mysore city in Karnataka State, India.

It is located on the western side of Mysore, and is sometimes considered part of downtown Mysore because of its proximity to the city center.

There is a post office at Saraswathipuram.

== Academic Community ==
Saraswathipuram was originally designed as a residential tract for teachers and most of the residents were academics. But recently people from all walks of life have settled there. The academics form a majority even now because the University of Mysore and many other major organizations are located in Saraswathipuram. The area is considered an upmarket place because of its shaded streets and beautiful parks.

== Notable landmarks ==
- Kukkarahalli Lake
- Saraswathipuram Fire Brigade Station
- Saraswathipuram Public Library
- Maruthi Temple
- Shree Chandramouleshwara Temple
- Mysore University
- Karnataka State Open University
- Sri Jayachamarajendra College of Engineering
- All India Institute of Speech and Hearing
- Happy Man Park
- Javaregowda Park

== Kukkarahalli lake ==
Kukkarahalli Lake is located in Saraswathipuram. This is a property of the University of Mysore and maintained by the university administration. The lake was created in 1864 for irrigation purpose. The lake has a three kilometer long perimeter track which is popular among joggers and trekkers. The biodiversity of the lake area is impressive with many species of birds present in this area. preserve the lake by implementing several remedial measures.

== See also ==
- Akshaya Bhandar
- Happy Man park
- Kukkarahalli lake
- University of Mysore

== Image gallery ==
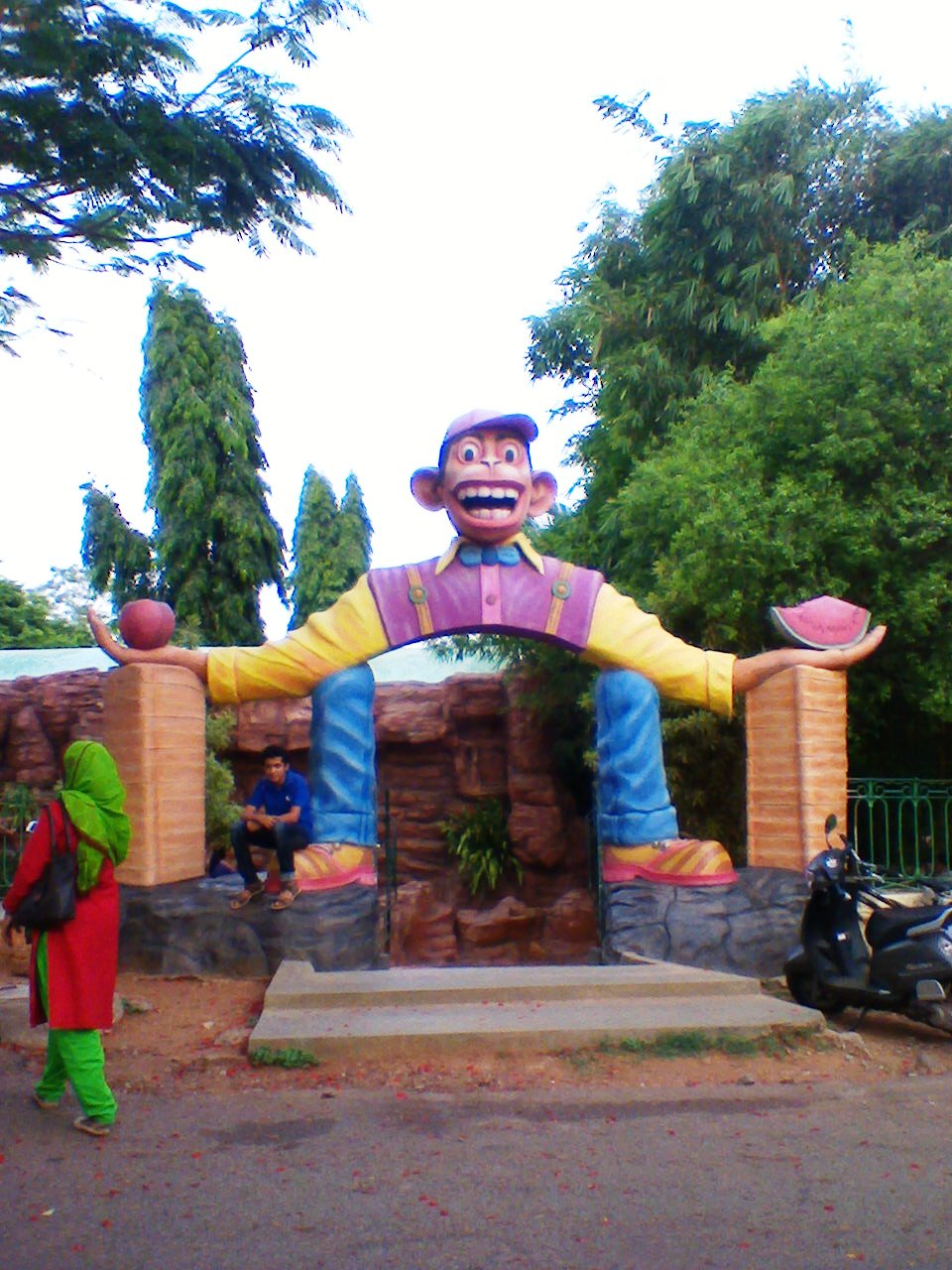
Sanjeevini Park

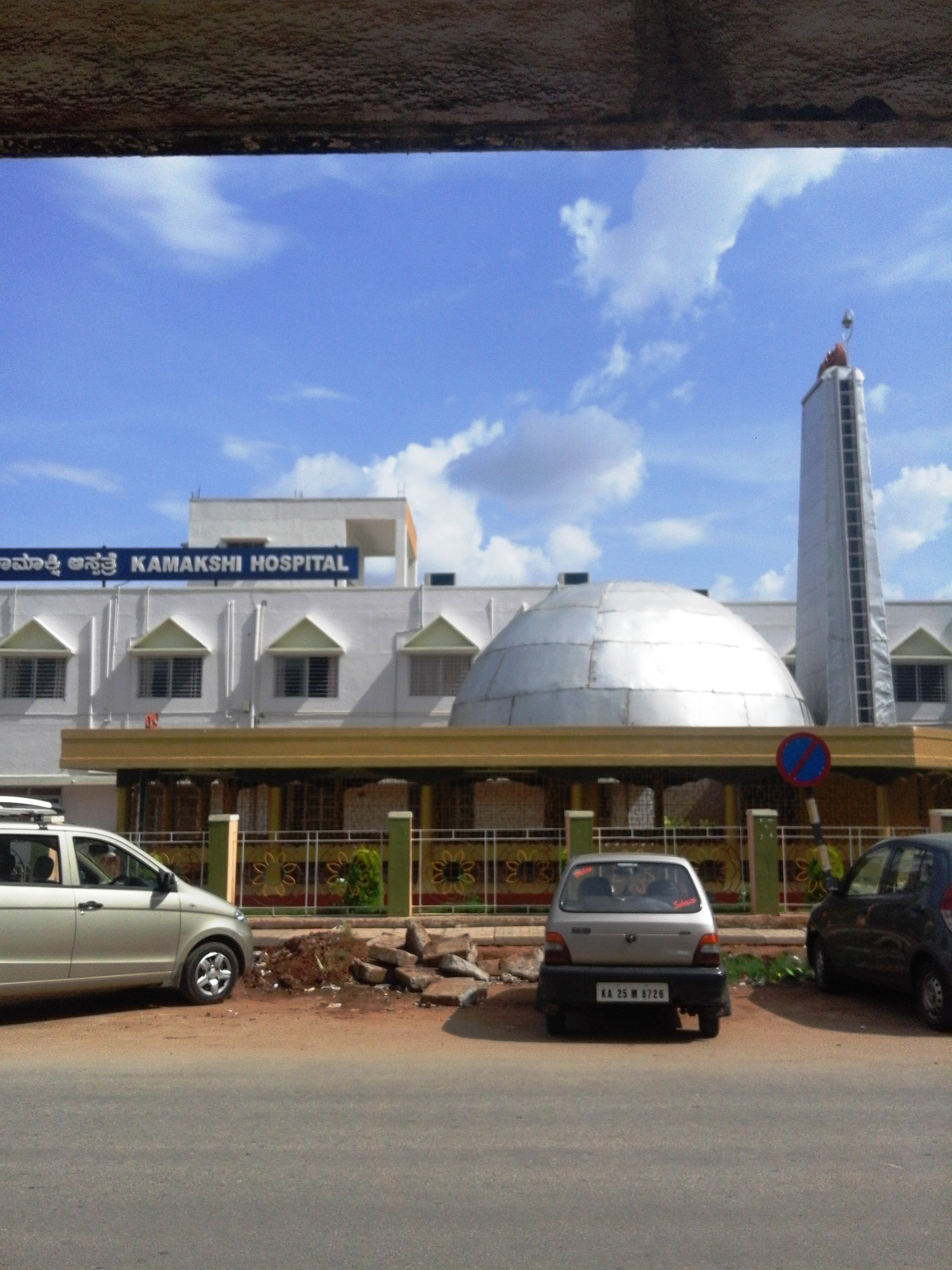
Kamakshi Hospital

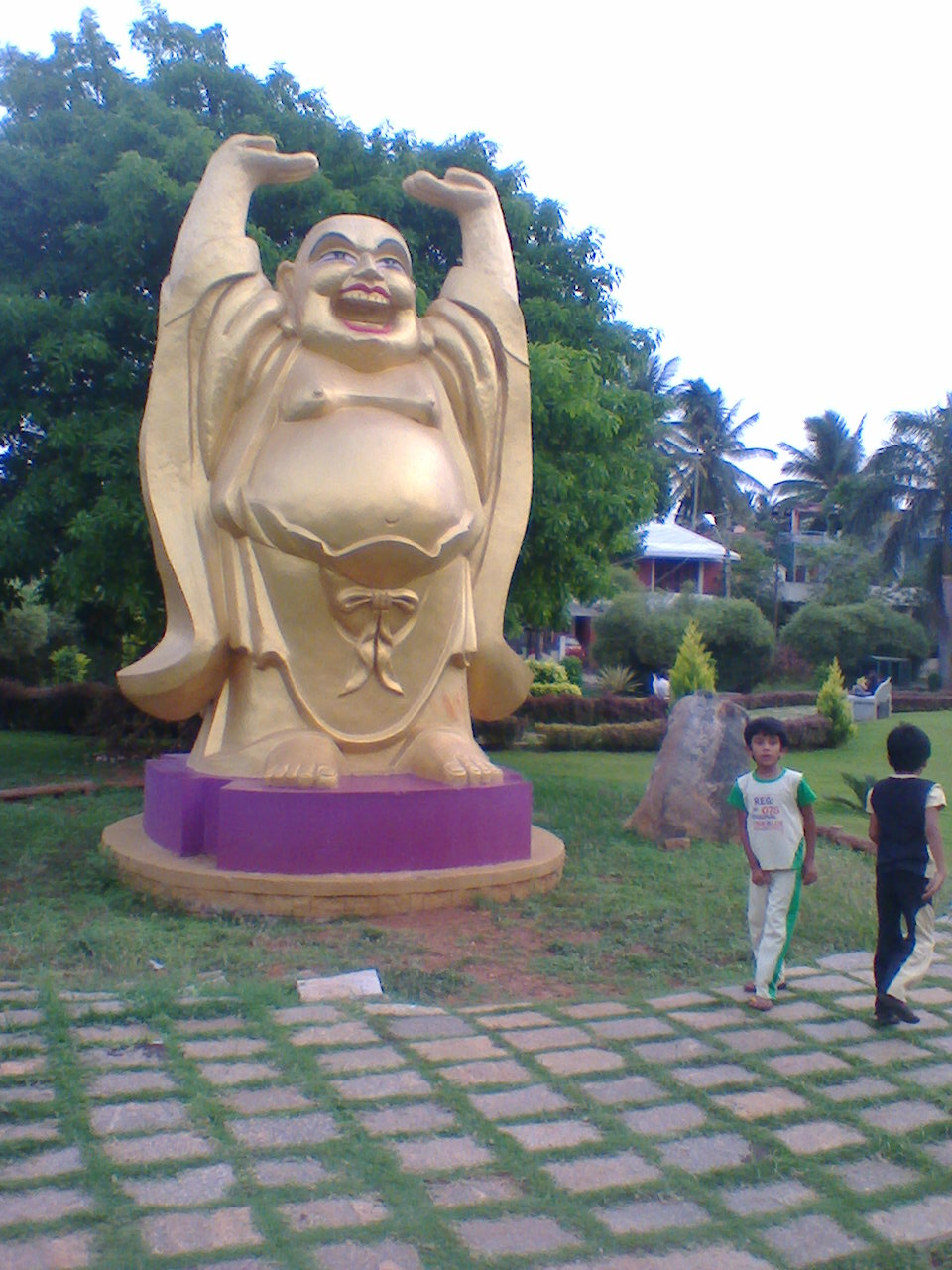
Sanjeevini Park

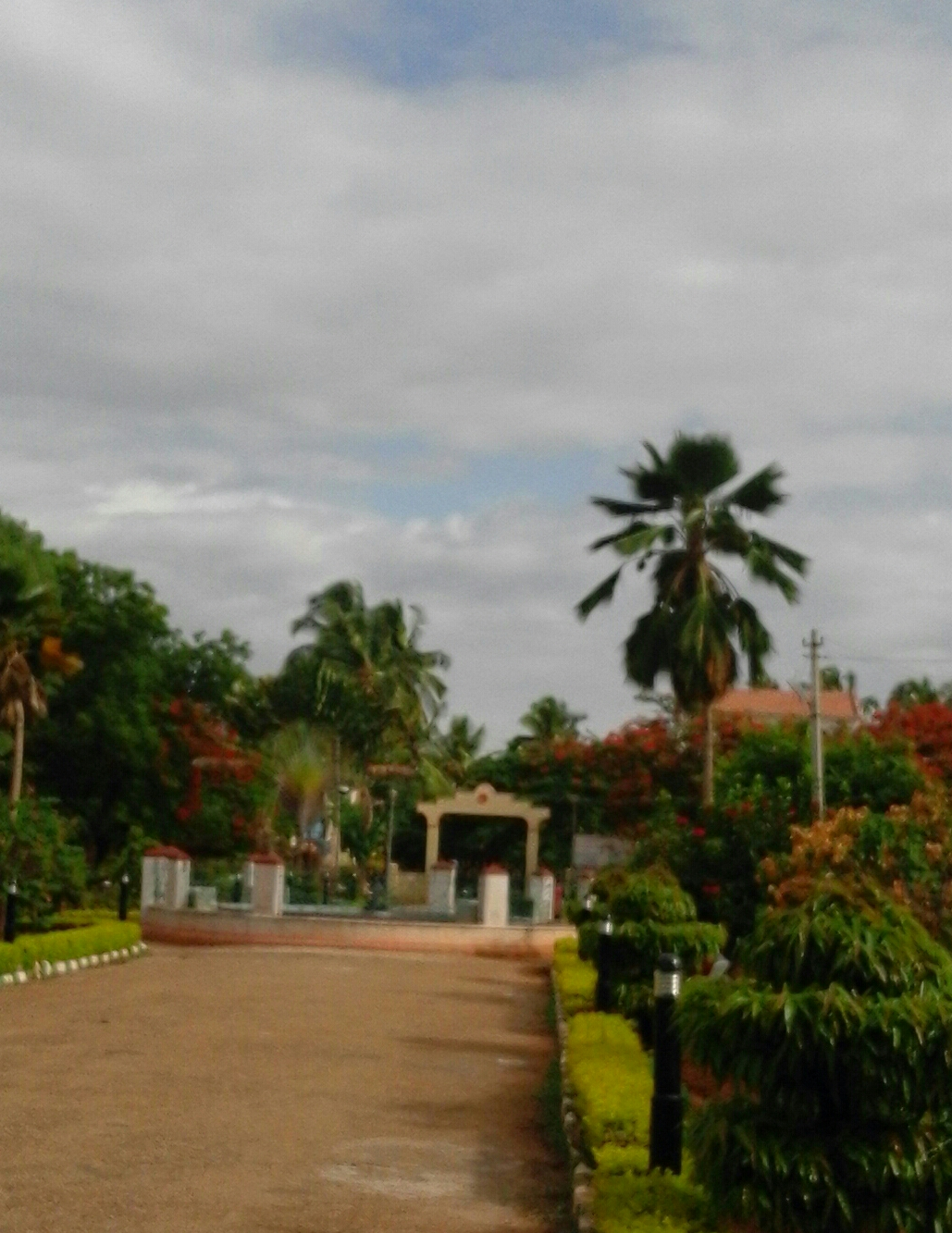
Javaregowda Park

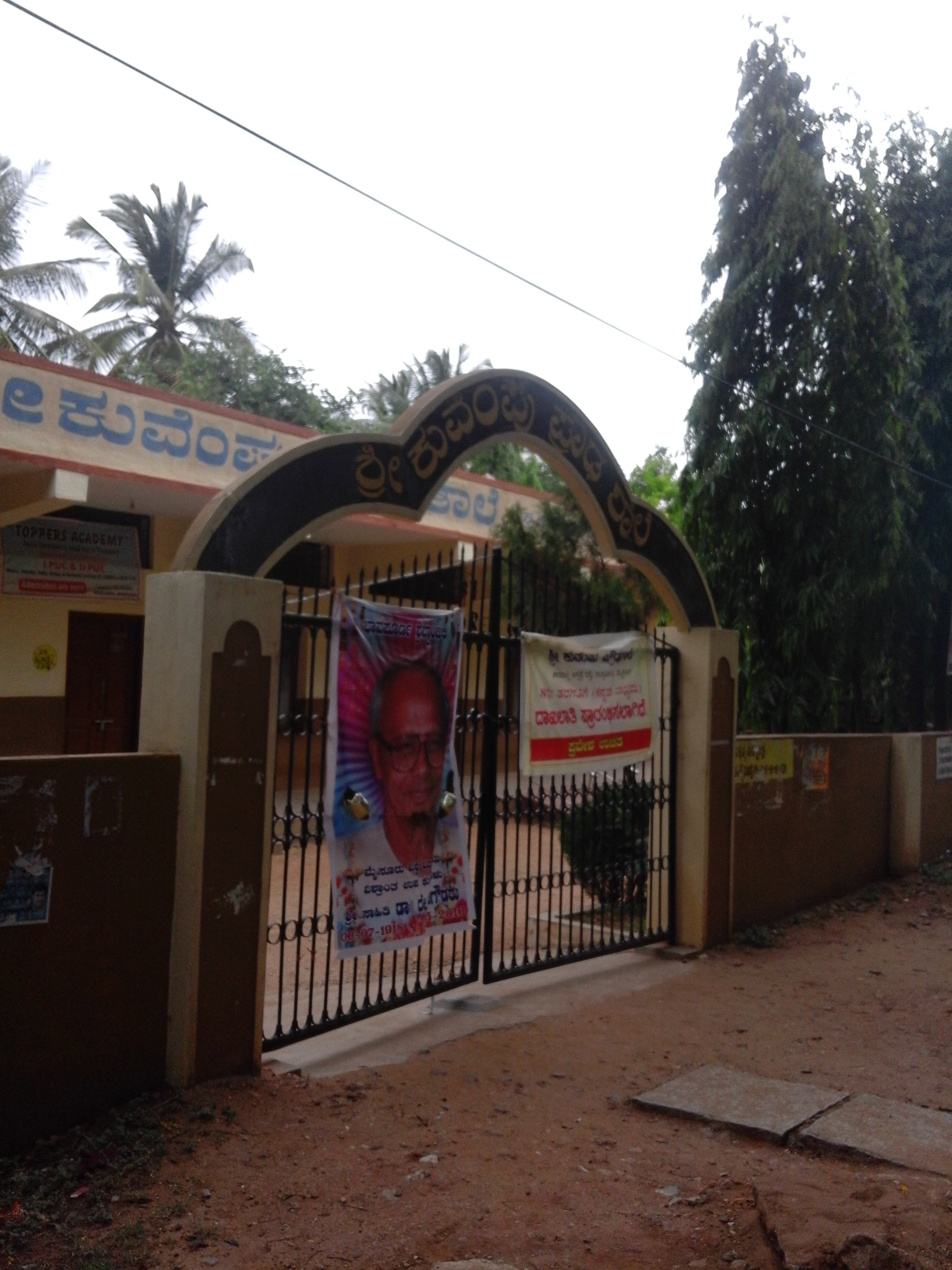
Kuvempu School

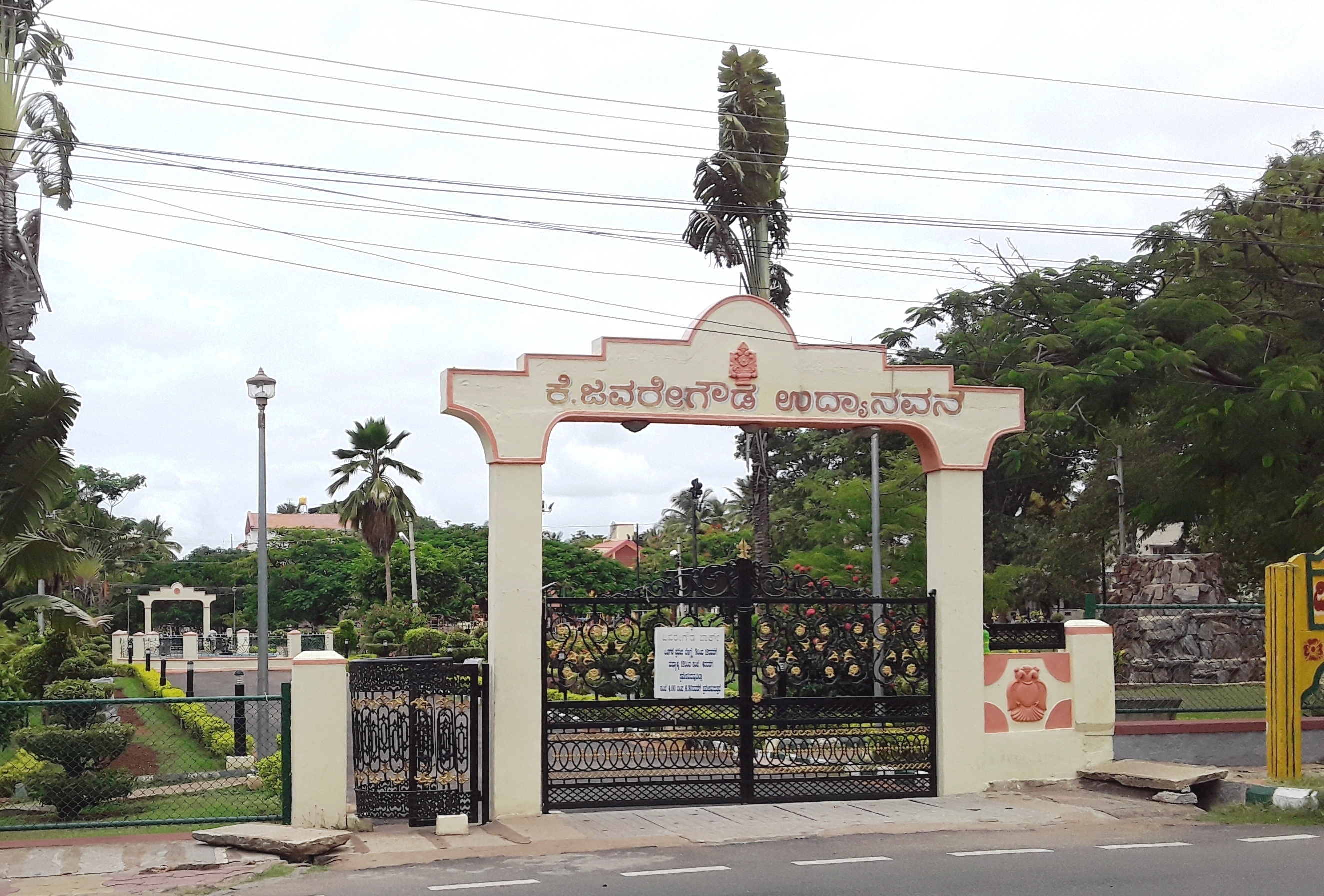
Javaregowda Park gate

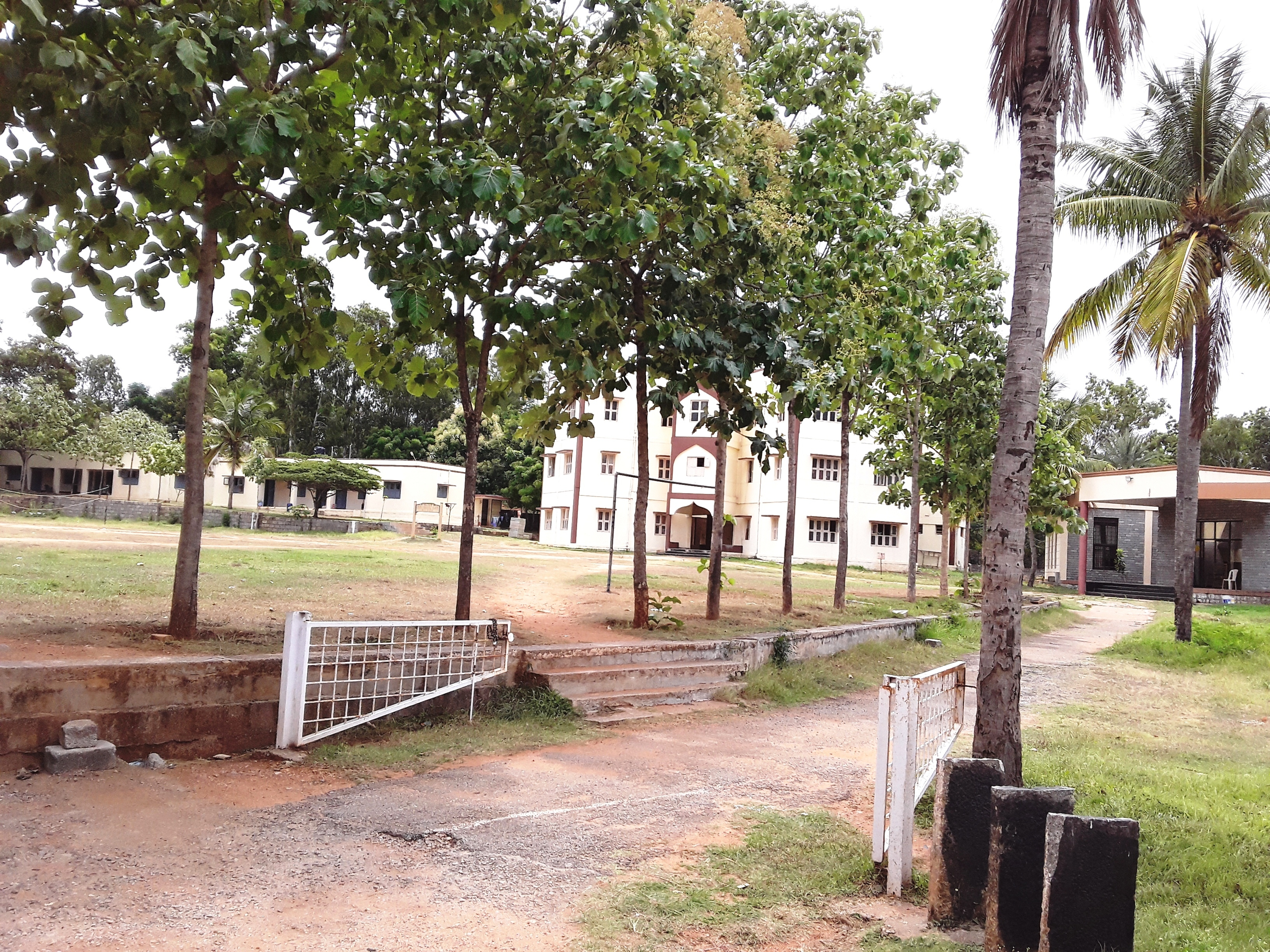
Muslim Hostel
