= Happy Man Park =

Park located in Mysore city, India

Coordinates: 12.29937°N 76.62475°E

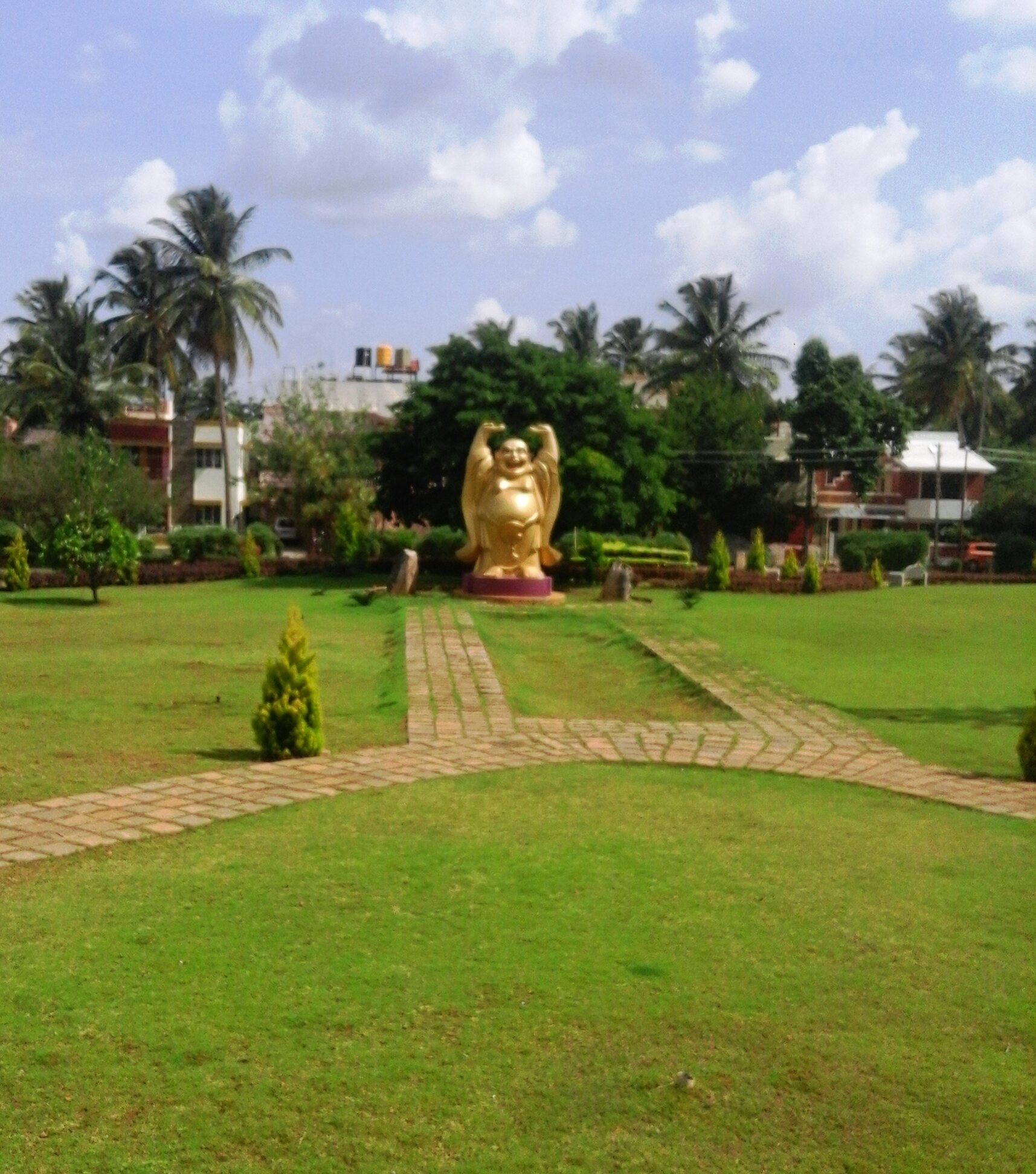
Happyman park from the Kamakshi street

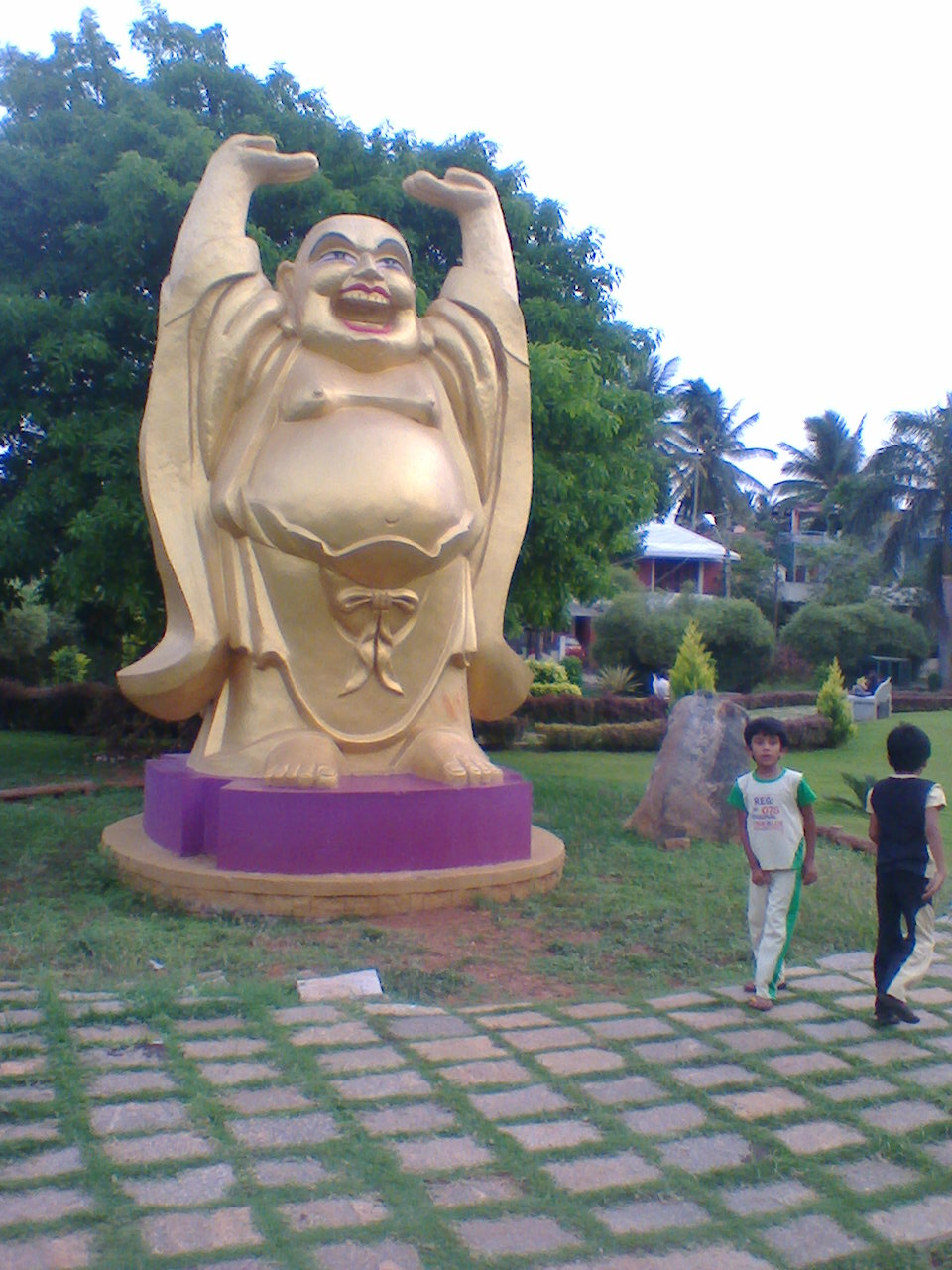
Happy Man park, Saraswathipuram

Happy Man Park is one of the tourist attractions of Mysore city in Karnataka province, India.

== Location ==
The park is located near Kamakshi Hospital at Saraswathipuram, Mysore.

== Attractions ==
The park has little streams and footpaths designed for small children. There is a special play section for kids. There is a mini zoo in the park. A small number of birds and rabbits are kept in cages.

== The Happy Man Statue ==
The name of the park is derived from the statue of the man with a pot belly located on the southern corner of the park. The happy man looks like the smiling Budha. The garden is well manicured and walking on the grass is not allowed. The walk remains closed during lunch hours for maintenance.

== Image gallery ==
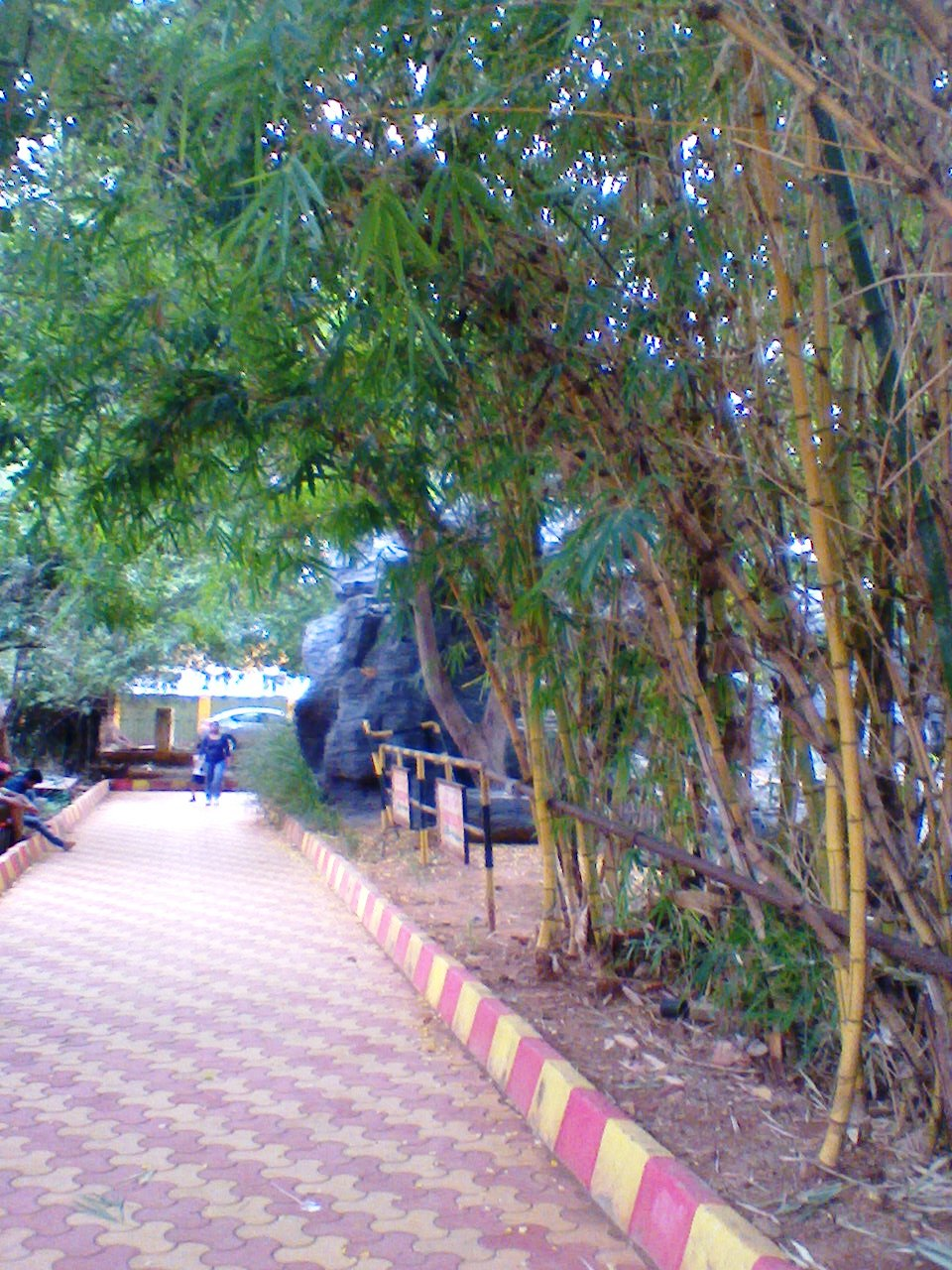
Footpath

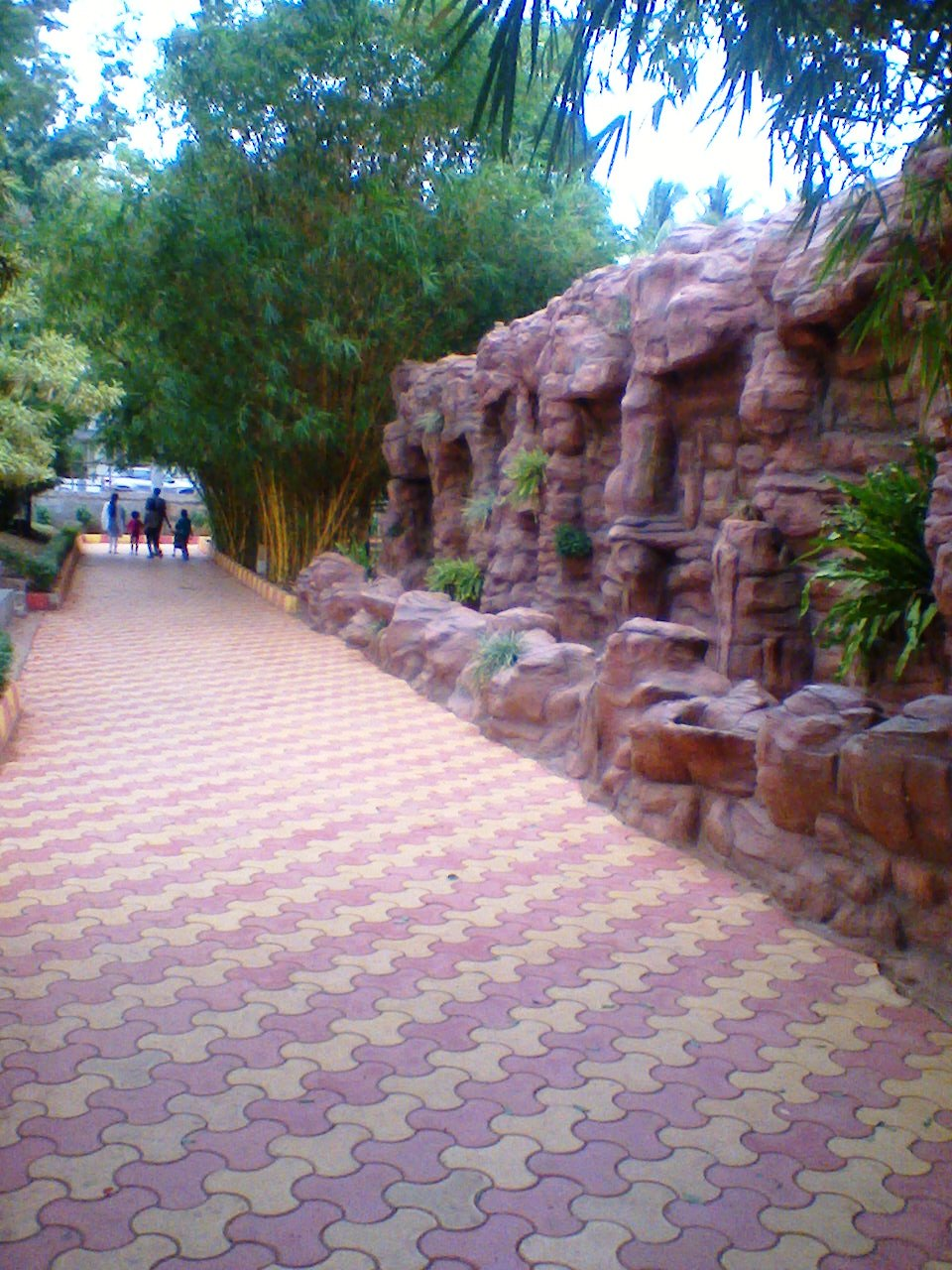
Inside the park

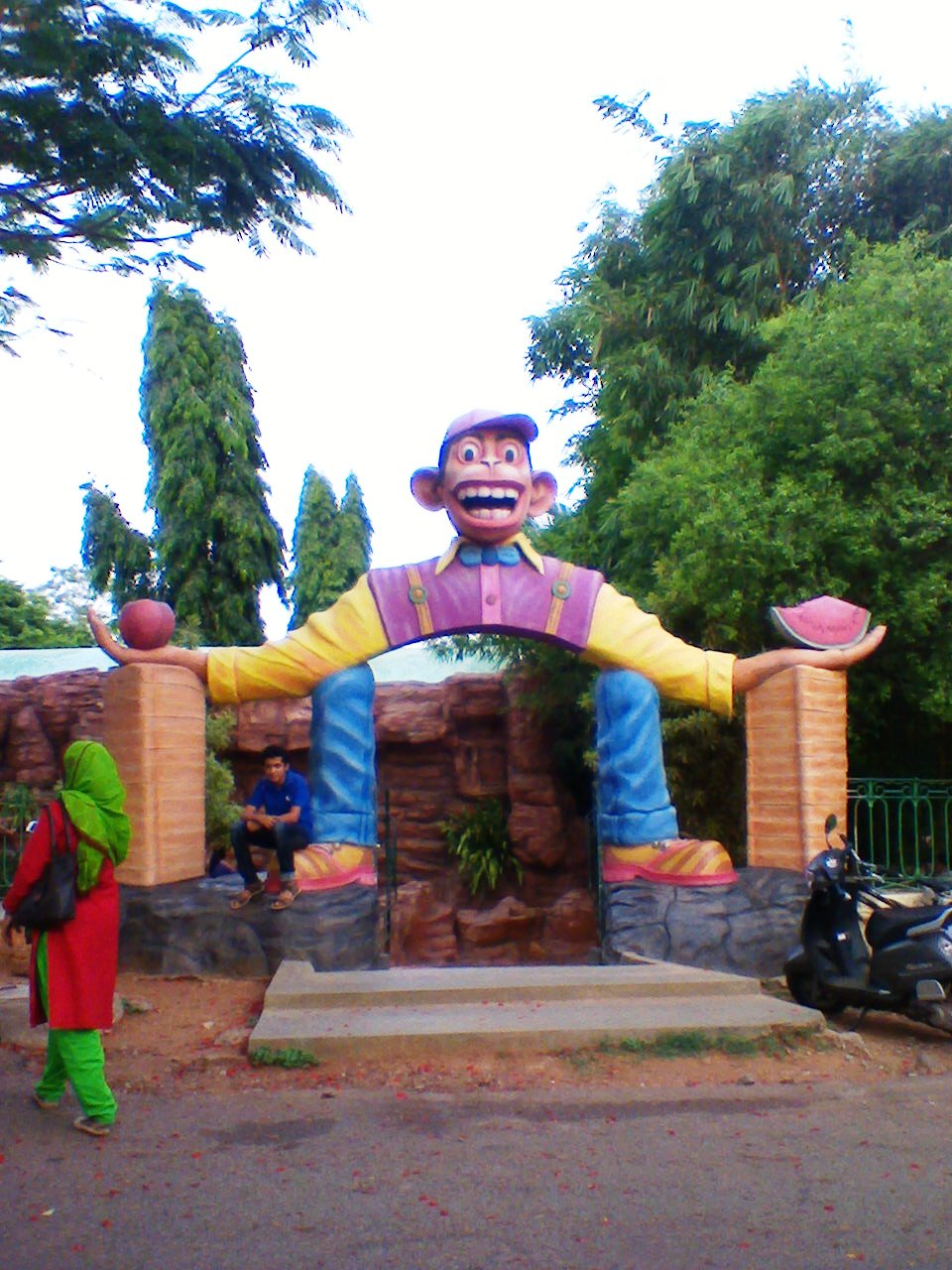
Entrance

== See also ==
- Saraswathipuram, Mysore
