= Akshaya Bhandar =

Coordinates: 12.296347°N 76.628816°E

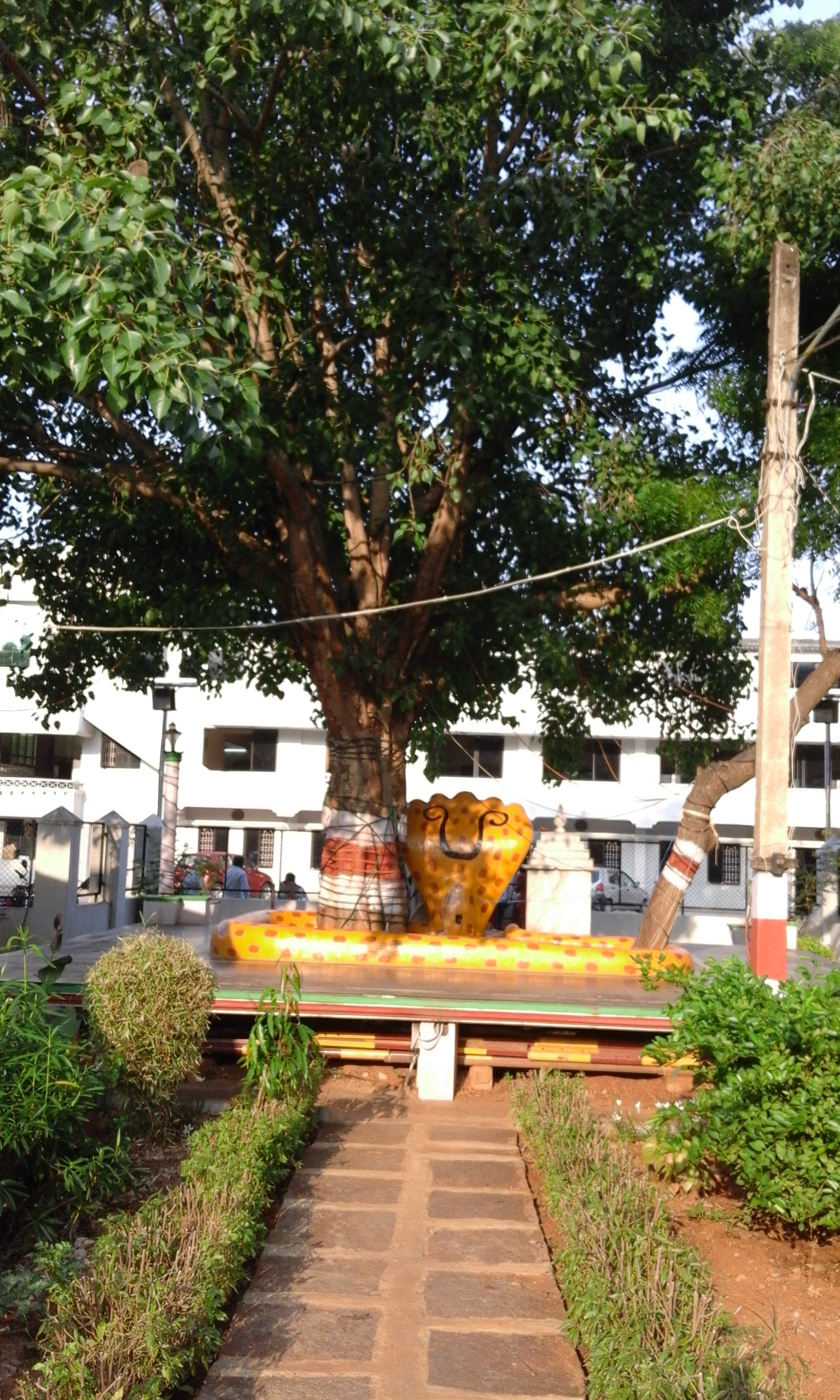
Adishkathi, Bandanthamma, Kaalamma Temple

Akshaya Bhandar is a suburb of Mysore in Karnataka, India.

== Location ==
Akshaya Bhandar junction and residential suburb are located between Kuvempu Nagar and Saraswathipuram in southern Mysore. Panchamantra road from Kuvempu complex junction meets New Kantharaj Urs Road at Akshaya Bhandar forming a T-junction.

== Etymology ==
Akshaya means everlasting and Bhandar means shop. The reference is to the oldest grocery store of the locality which still operates near the junction.

== Educational Organizations ==
- Gnana Ganga School
- J.S.S.Law College JSS Law College – Law College in Mysore
- Raghavendra PU College
- Kaginele B.Ed College

== Other Landmarks ==
- Bandantamma Temple
- Thaponandana Park
- Vishwanandana Park
- Bhanavi Hospital
- Sri Bandanthamma Kaalamma Community Hall
- Apollo BGS Hospital
- Sri Adishkathi Sri Bandanthamma Sri Kaalamma Temple

== Pincode ==
There are two post offices in Akshaya Bhandar, namely Saraswathipuram and Tonachi Koppal(T.K.) Layout, both with the pin code being 570009.

== Transportation ==
The nearest railway station is Chamarajapuram one kilometer away. Bus No.62 connects this junction to the city bus station.

== Economy ==
Akshaya Bhandar is an upmarket residential locality with numerous banks, shops and educational institutions around the junction.

== See also ==
- Kuvempunagara
- Jayanagara
- Saraswathipuram

== Image gallery ==
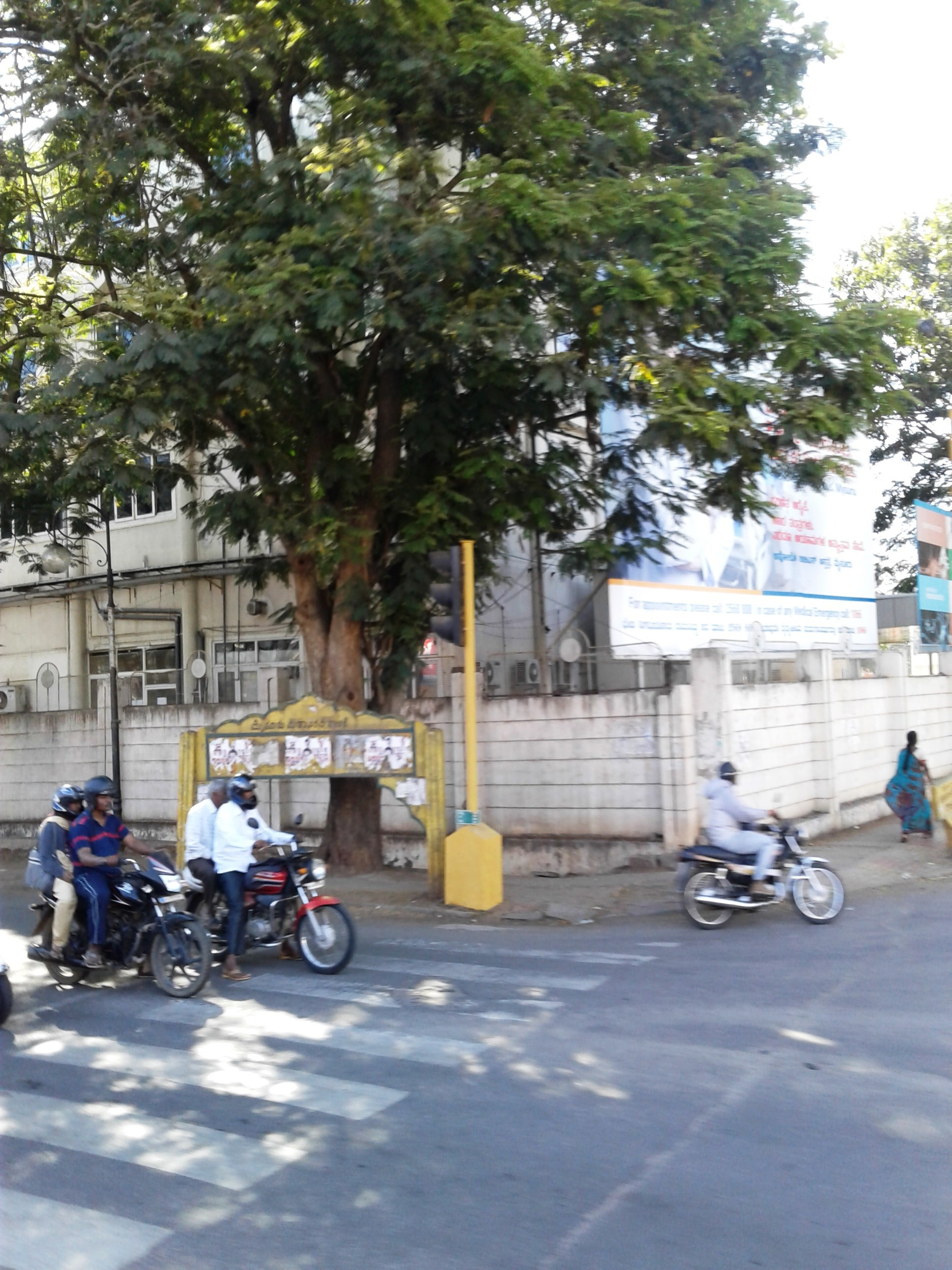
Apollo Hospital

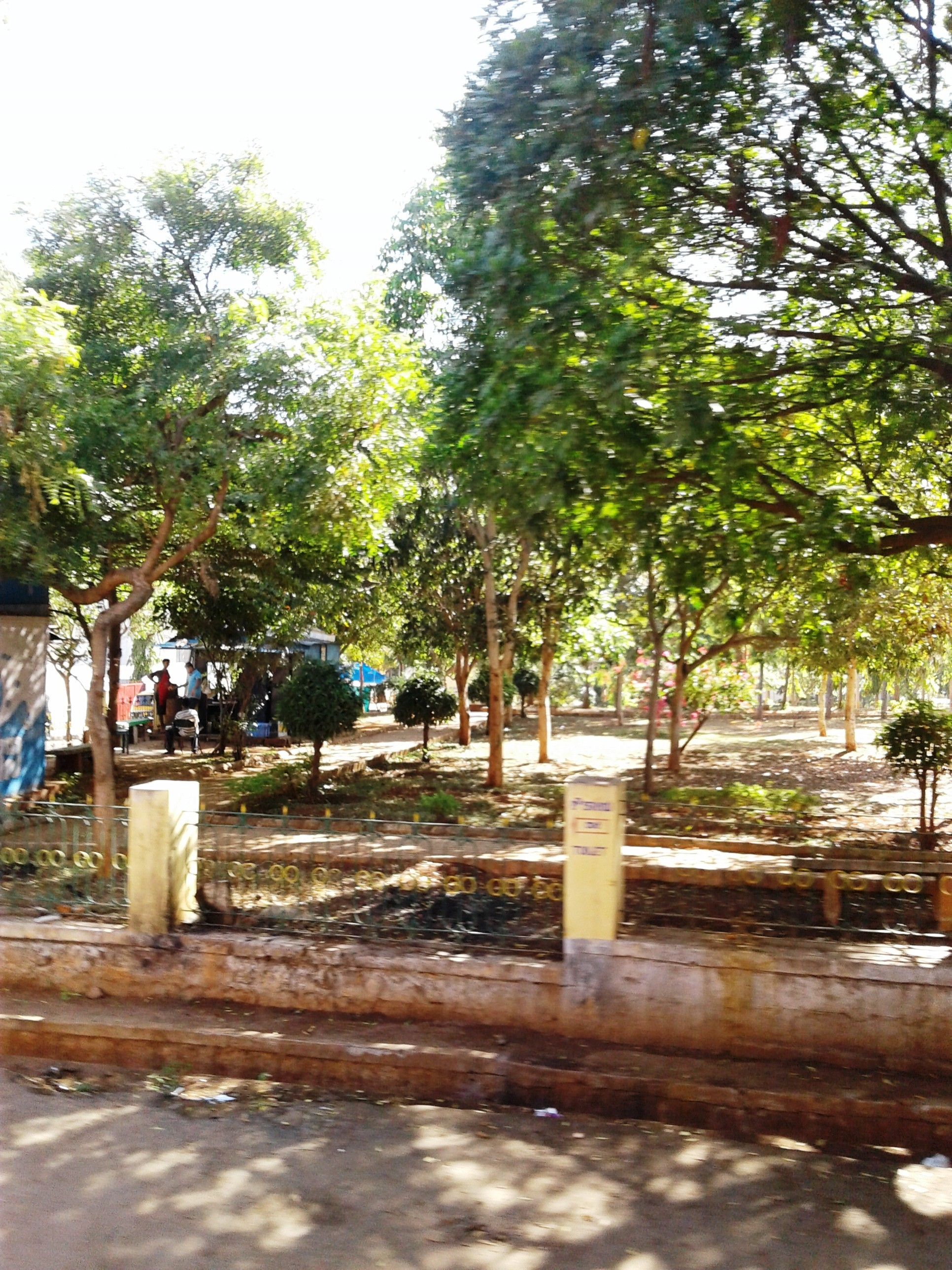
Vishwanandana Park

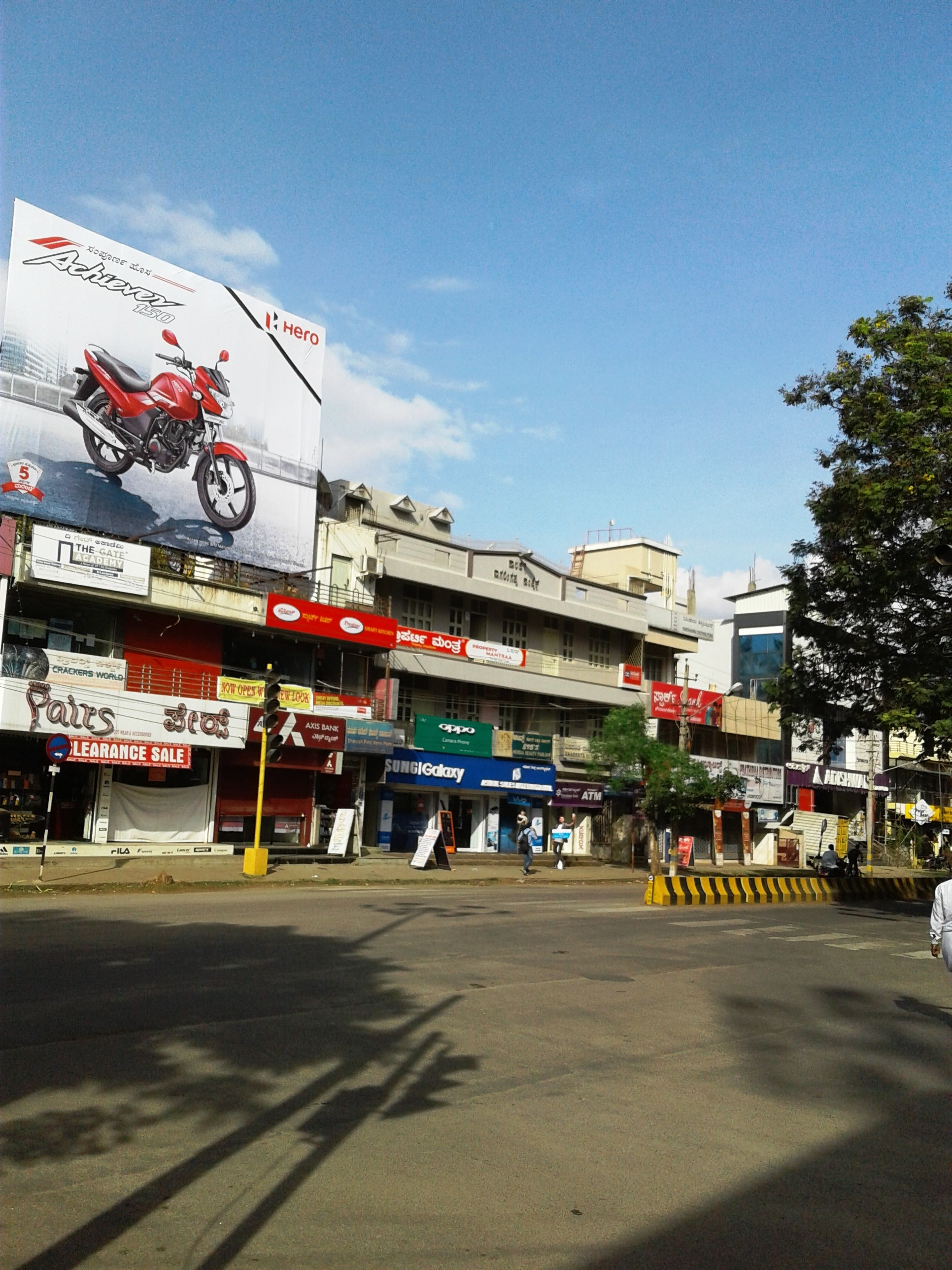
Akshaya Bhandar Junction

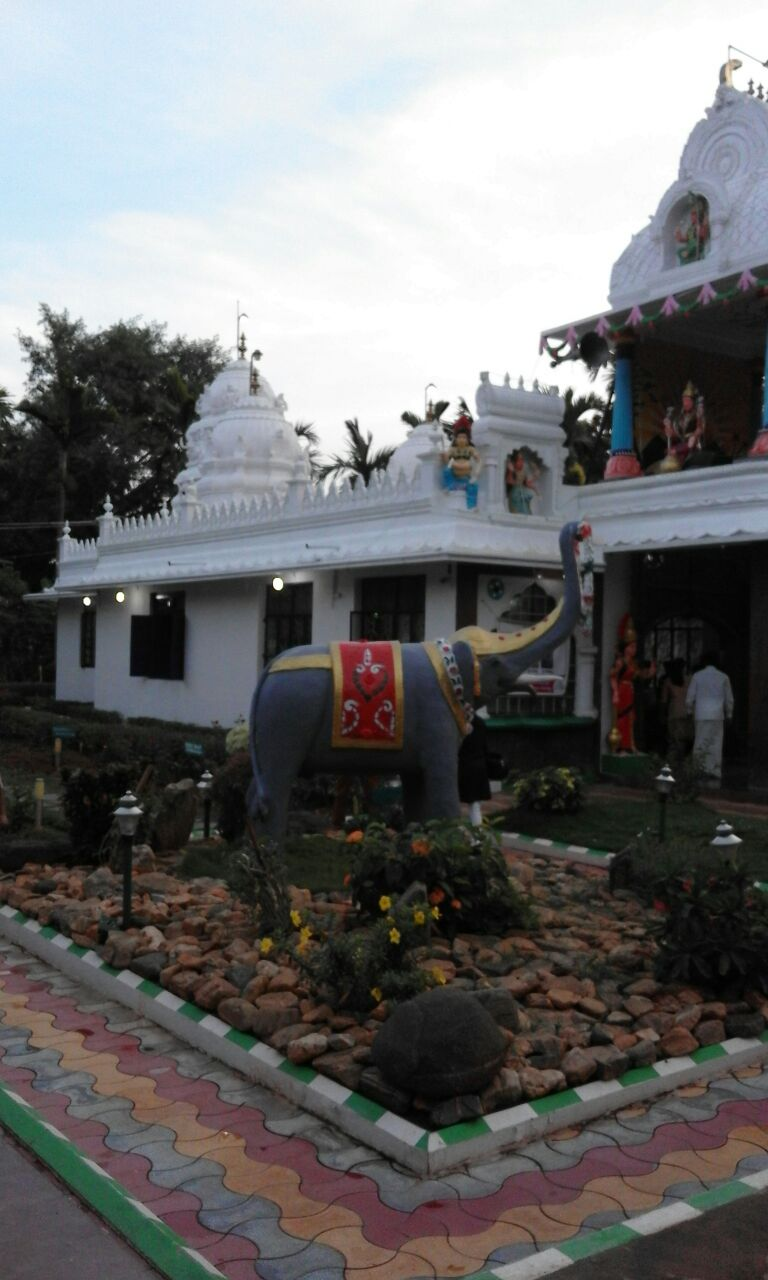
Adishakthi Temple

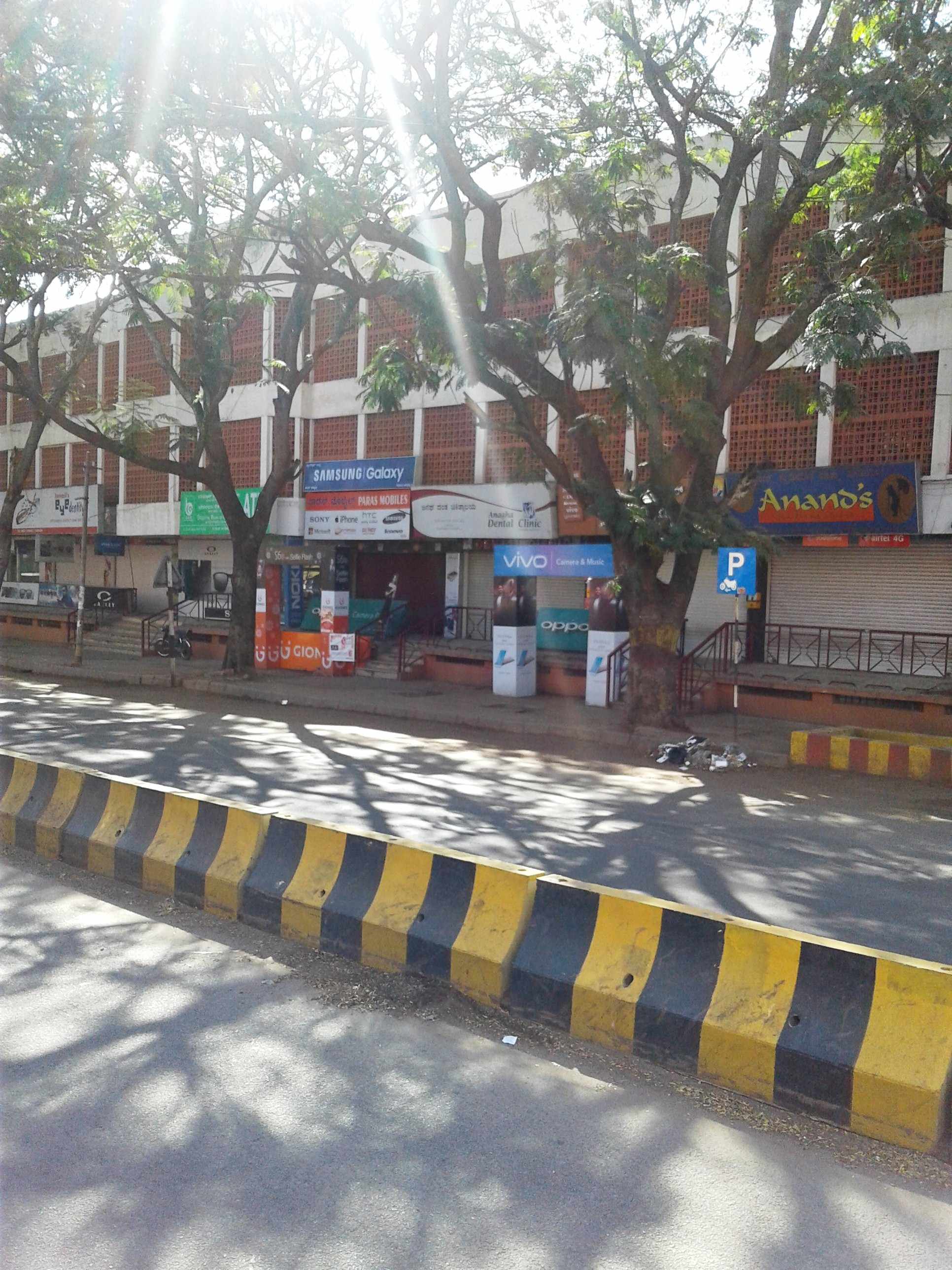
JSS Law College
