= Kukkarahalli Lake =

Lake in Mysore, India

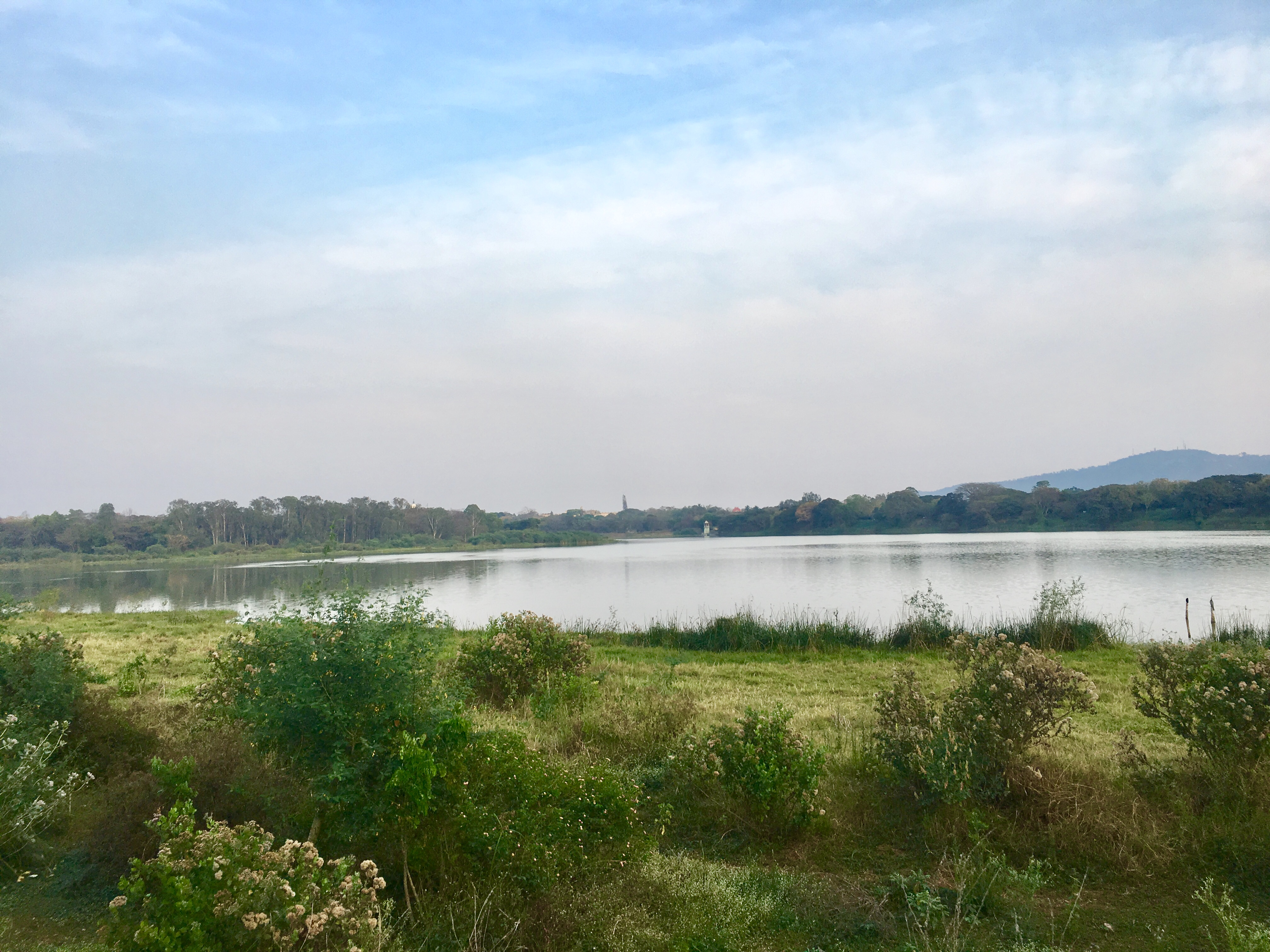

- Location within Karnataka
- Location: Mysore
- Coordinates: 12.3°N 76.63°E
- Type: Freshwater Kukkarahally- Recreational and Fisheries
- Catchment area: 414 km^{2} (160 sq mi)
- Basin countries: India
- Surface area: 62 ha (150 acres)
- Max. depth: 5 m (16 ft)
- Water volume: 2.53×10^{6} m^{3} (89×10^{6} cu ft)
- Shore length^{1}: 5 km (3.1 mi)
- Surface elevation: 755.73 m (2,479.4 ft)
- Settlements: Mysore
- ^{1} Shore length is not a well-defined measure.

Kukkarahalli Lake also called Kukkarhalli Kere (Lake is ‘’kere’’ in local Kannada language), located in the heart of the Mysore city, adjoins the Manasgangotri (University of Mysore), the Kalamandir (Rangyana) and the Central Food Technological Research Institute (CFTRI) campus (separated by the Hunsur Road). It provides lung-space to the city. Mummadi Krishnaraja Wodeyar (1794–1868) of the Mysore dynasty (Kingdom of Mysore) was responsible for getting the lake created, in the year 1864, to provide water for irrigation to about 4000 ha (10,000 acres) of land outside the city. The Lake also used to be a source of water supply to the city of Mysore but over the years, sewage and excessive land encroachments (mostly illegal) and blockage of water flow sources almost led to the eutrophication of the lake. The University of Mysore and the citizen forums of Mysore continue to make efforts to preserve the lake by implementing several remedial measures. There is a 3.5-km walkway on the periphery of the lake with shaded stone benches for visitors to sit, relax and enjoy the scenic serenity of the lake.

== Access ==
The lake is located within the Mysore city limits. The Mysore City railway station is about 3 km (1.9 mi) from the Lake.

== Hydrology ==
The lake drains a catchment area of more than 414 square kilometres (160 sq mi) and the water body spreads over 62 hectares (150 acres). Dewan Poornaiah feeder canal, 27 km (17 mi) long, which passes through Hinkal, Bogadi, Kudremala and Manasagangotri outfalls into the Lake. The Lake is J-shaped. The maximum depth of lake is reported to be 5 m (16 ft). The east–west bund holds water on one side. Sandy loam to clay loam form the dominant geological condition of the Lake. On the northern side another temporary bund hold back the direct flow of waste water into the lake.

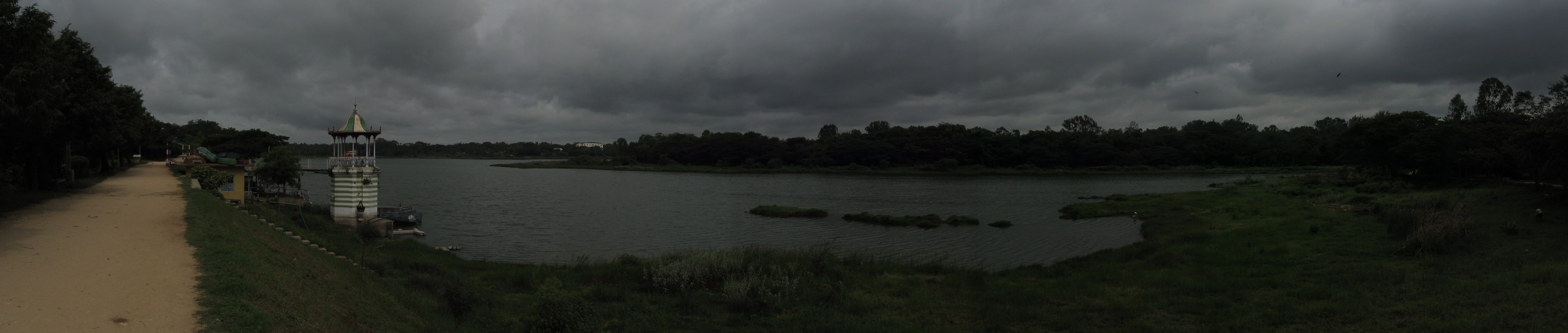
Panoramic view of Kukkarahalli Lake in Mysore

The highest flood level in the lake is 755.73 m (2,479.4 ft).

== Water quality ==
A detailed study of the physico-chemical and bio-chemical parameters of the lake waters carried out in the period 1981-2001 confirmed the deteriorating status of the lake necessitating action for restoration. There was a high percentage of chemicals but low percentage of total plankton (43%). The activity of chemicals lead to the liberation of extra quantity of cellular products which increased to 53.19%. Lake indicated high productivity of bio-chemical products; with death and decay of algal blooms adding to the biochemical concentration. The lake waters showed high electrolytes, low dissolved oxygen, high phosphate and nitrogen content with abundance of plankton blooms, all of which have contributed to a high degree of eutrophication. The non potability of the water body is indicated by the high degree of faecal contamination with organisms that produce H2S that may include forms of Salmonella, Proteus, Citrobacter and some strains of Klebsiella. The distribution pattern of plank tonic forms, for the decade ending 2001, as per laboratory tests of lake's water samples provides the values of parameters such as the Chlorococcales, Desmids, Diatoms, Blue-greens and Euglenoids, as the biological indicators of water body, as given in table below which testify to the lake's eutrophication status. The numbers indicate the microorganisms present in the sample per litre.

Parameters	Kukkarahalli Lake		
Year / group	1981	1991	2001
Chlorococcales	35,3251	54,2210	43,8342
Desmids	150	Nil	7
Diatoms	5,822	5,132	6,173
Blue-greens	24,325	23,420	20,719
Euglenoids	8,321	3,251	6,577
Dinoflagellates	210	622	174

=== Utility of algal biomass ===
Scientists have reported that exploitation of polluted waters which are rich in algal biomass for biotechnological products could be a feasible proposition and that the Phycobiliproteins from algae could be used as sensitive fluorescent dye, as immunochemical reagent and also as efficient fluorochromes in multiple colour analysis.

== Bird watching ==
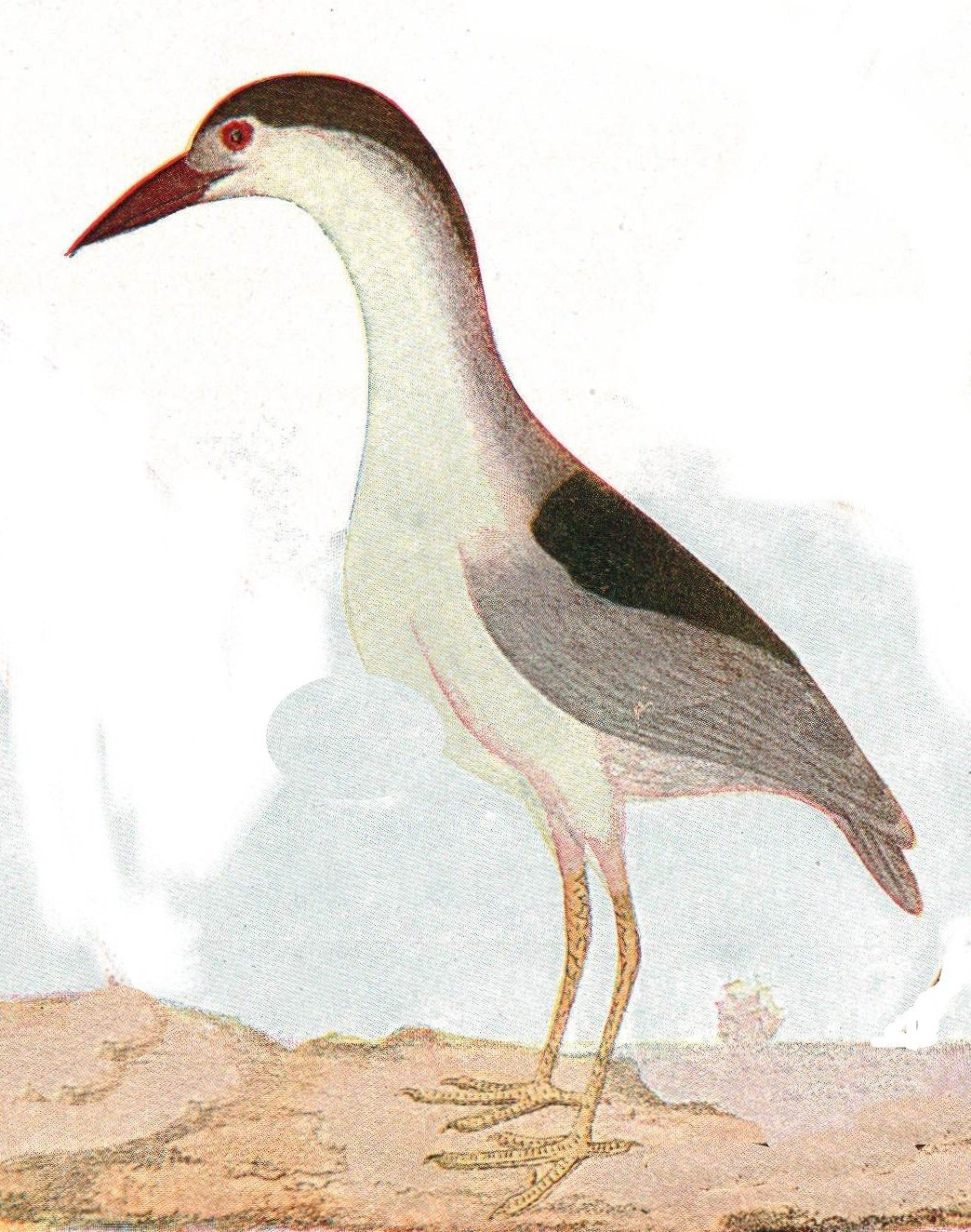
Night heron illustration

The lake was once a big attraction to bird watchers. According to naturalists, about 176 species of birds (a large number of them migratory birds, including birds from Siberia) with 10,000 to 15,000 of them visited the lake during winter to roost. Organised bird watching expeditions around the lake used to be actively pursued by the Mysore Amateur Naturalists (MAN) Association. In recent years, with the lake getting into a eutrophic state (though since restored), the number of birds visiting the lake has substantially decreased. Now, the number of birds visiting the lake has reduced to about 2,000. They are found to breed in the isolated bird island. The birds now found in the lake (some of the birds are pictured in the gallery) are spot-billed pelicans, little cormorant, painted storks, openbill storks, Eurasian spoonbills, black-crowned night herons and Oriental darters. BirdLife International has included Kukkarahalli Lake in the list of 38 important Important Bird Areas (IBAs) in the State of Karnataka.

== Lake restoration ==
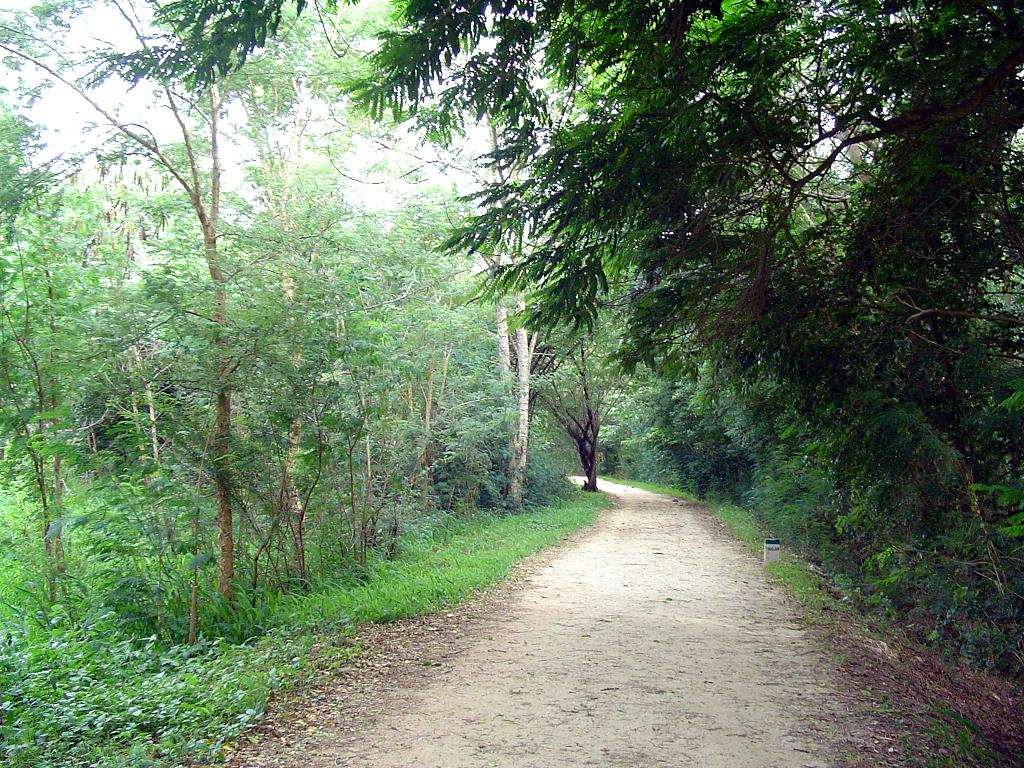
The jog path/walkway along the Kukkarahally Lake

During the year 2003–2004, with grants of about US$0.2 million (Rs 91 lakhs) provided by the Asian Development Bank, Karnataka Urban Infrastructure Development Corporation (KUIDFC) in association with the University of Mysore under whose jurisdiction the Lake falls and citizens groups, carried out the restoration works of the lake. In order to effectively reduce the external loading of pollutants and the intervention of wastes into the lake ecosystem the measures implemented have covered the following with funds provided by the Asian Development Bank.

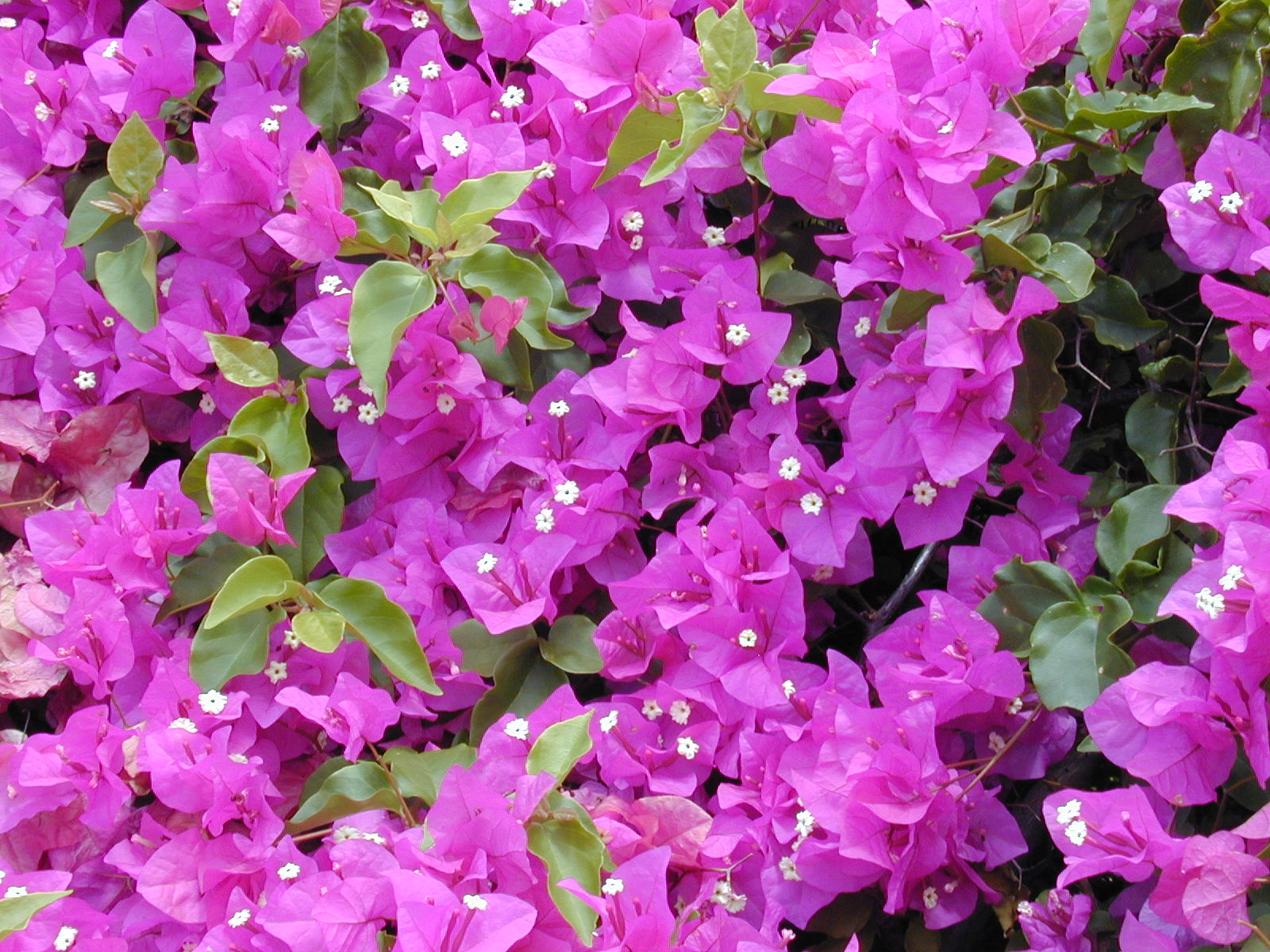
Bougainvillea flowers

- Widening of the bund on the southern side,
- Forming a new walkway on the western side for the benefit large number of morning walkers who visit the lake,
- Shaded (bougainvillea creepers) stone benches for visitors to sit, relax and enjoy the scenic serenity of the lake.
- Improving the eastern and the northern pathway,
- Fencing of the lake perimeter
- The iron watch tower (within the lake) about 100 feet (30 m) from the shores has been restored
- Lighting arrangement along the southern bund.
- Adopting rainwater harvesting methods to improve the quality and quantity of water inflows
- Augmenting supply to the lake with fresh water inflow with filtered municipal back water wash
- Adopting aeration of water techniques: boating is one of the methods widely adopted houses - a boating center has been established
- Removal of algae by manual methods
- Engineering methods to clean the boundary conditions of the lake such as desilting and opening of the intake channel
- Ban on immersion of idols during festivals
- Banned dumping of medical waste in the lake
- Increased security system to restrict human influence
- Increased aquaculture
- Stakeholders participation for collective ownership and responsibility to restoration activities

== Gallery ==
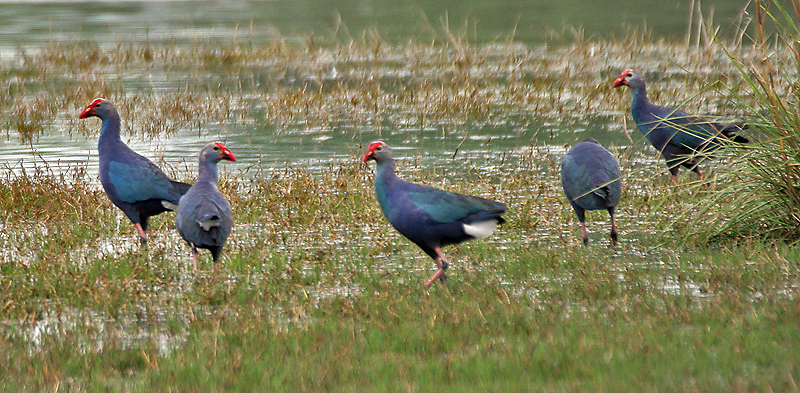
Purple moorhen

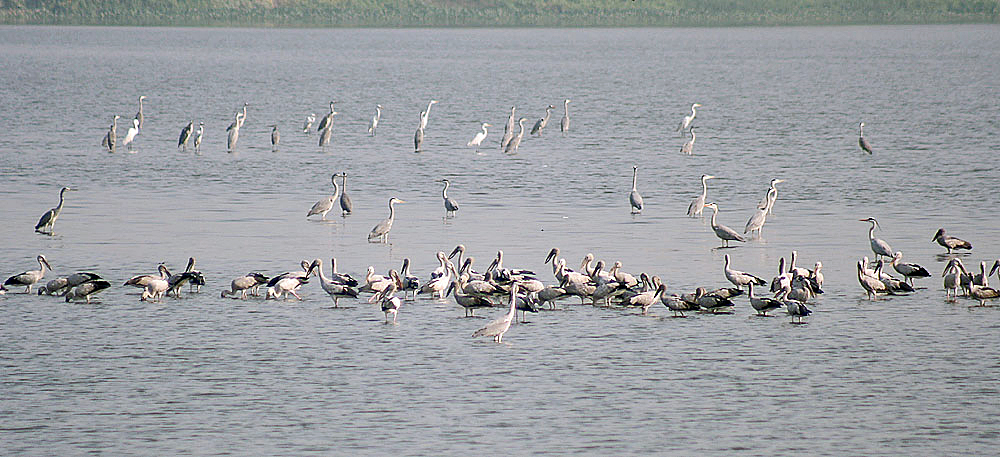
Asian openbill stork

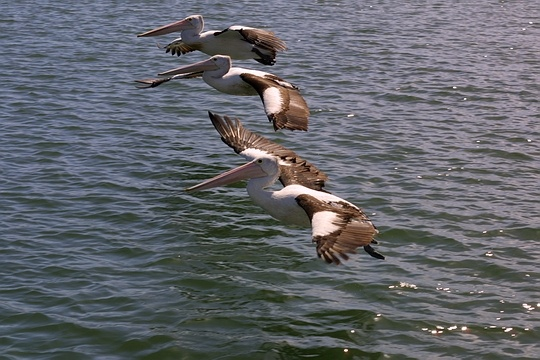
Three pelicans

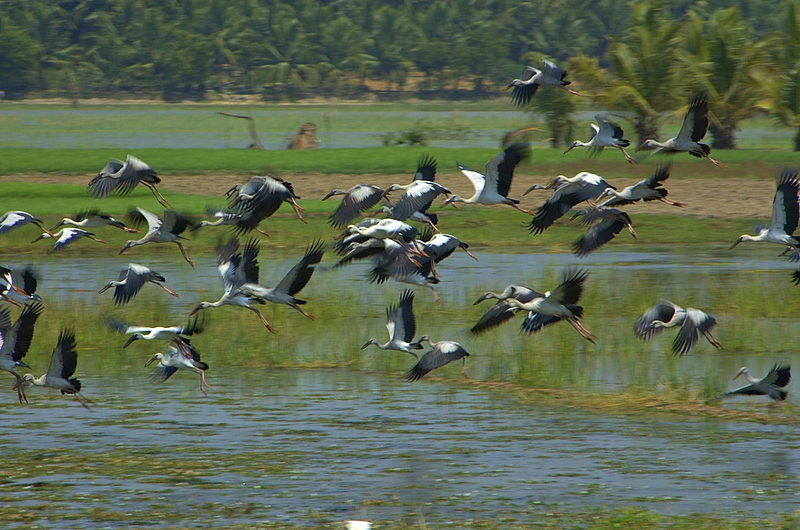
Openbill storks

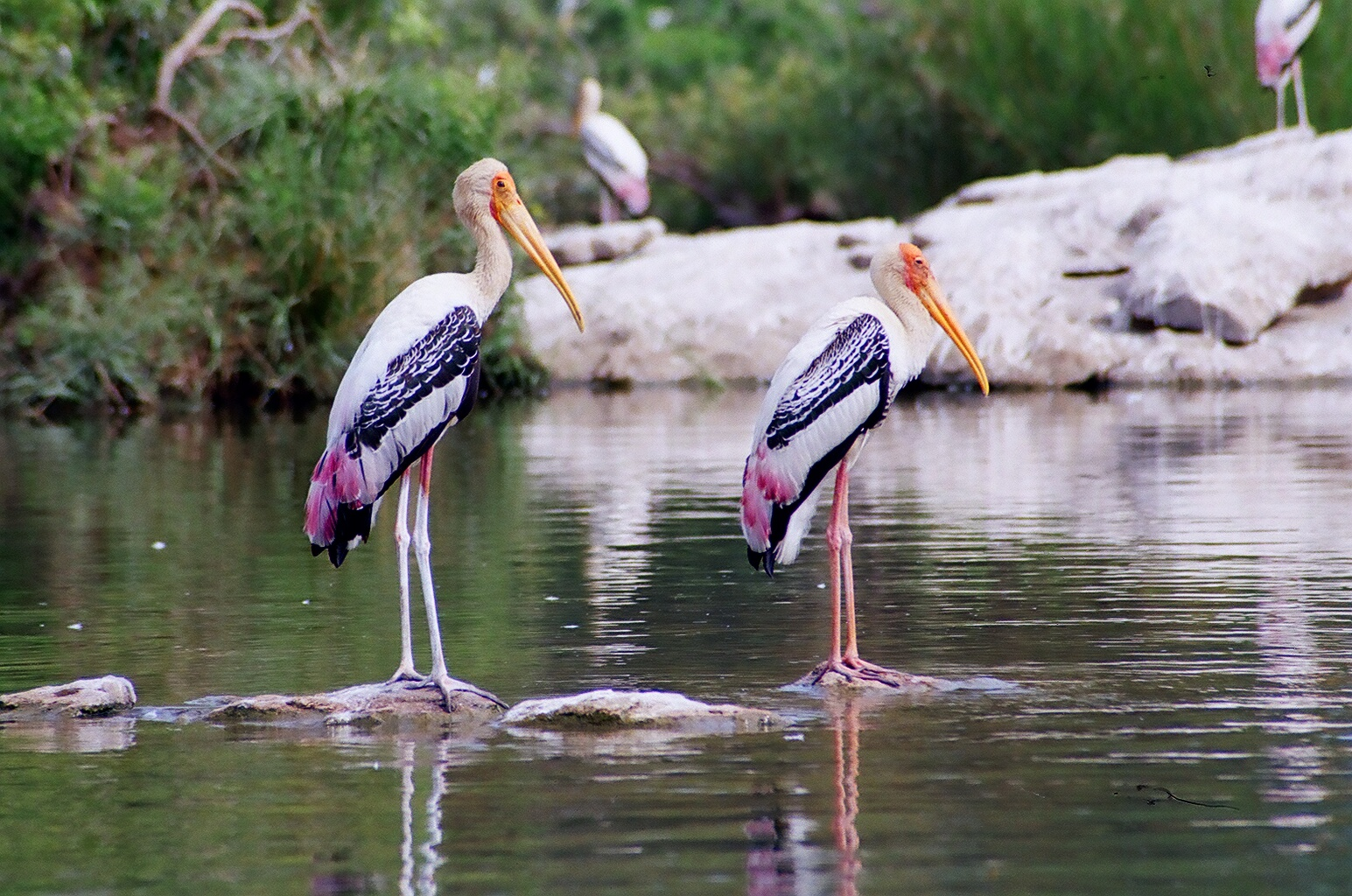
Painted storks

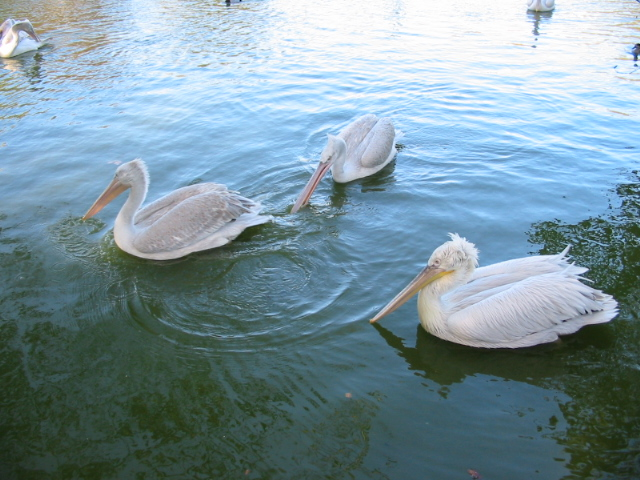
Pelicans

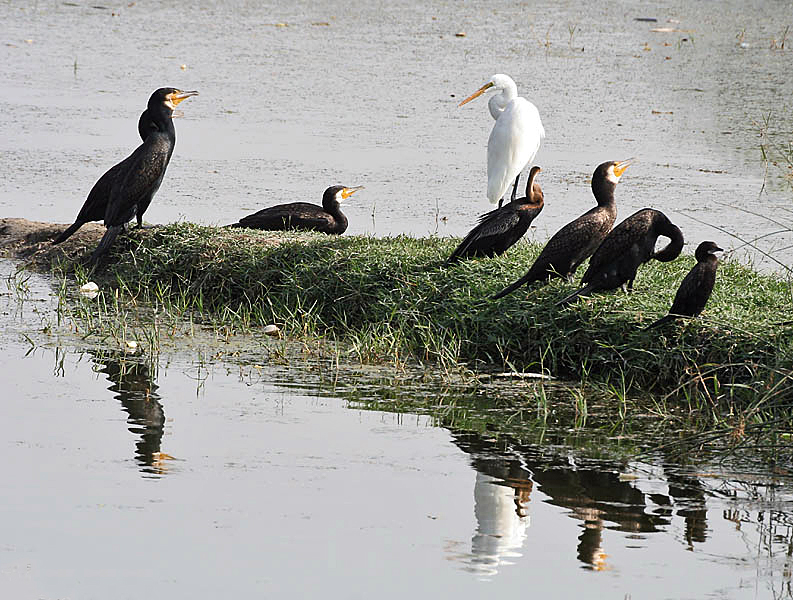
Cormorants (Phalacrocorax carbo)

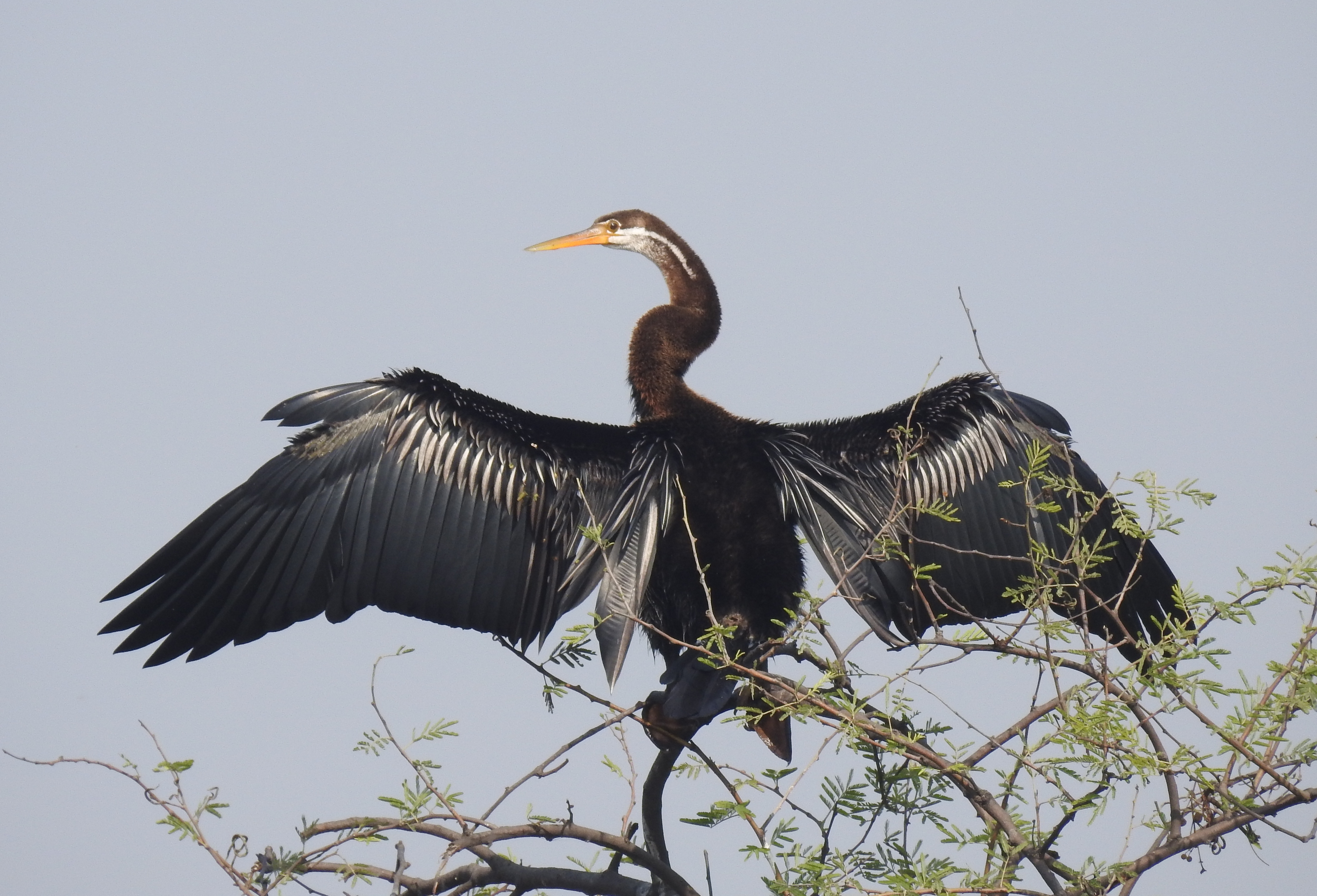
Oriental darter
