= Yadahalli =

Yadahalli may refer to:

- Yadahalli, Belgaum, a village in Parasgad Taluka, Belgaum District, Karnataka, India
- Yadahalli, Bagalkot, a village in Bagalkot Taluka, Bagalkot District, Karnataka, India
- Yadahalli, Bilagi, a village in Bilagi Taluka, Bagalkot District, Karnataka, India
- Yadahalli, Hungund, a village in Hungund Taluka, Bagalkot District, Karnataka, India
- Yadahalli, Mudhol, a village in Mudhol Taluka, Bagalkot District, Karnataka, India
- Yadahalli, Chintamani, a village in Chintamani Taluka, Kolar District, Karnataka, India
- Yadahalli, Kolar, a village in Kolar Taluka, Kolar District, Karnataka, India
- Yadahalli, Angondahalli a village in Angondahalli gram panchayat, Mulbagal Taluka, Kolar District, Karnataka, India
- Yadahalli, Gummakal, a village in Gummakal gram panchayat, Mulbagal Taluka, Kolar District, Karnataka, India
- Yadahalli, Mandya, a village in Krishnarajpet Taluka, Mandya District, Karnataka, India
- Yadahalli, Mysore, a village in Anandur panchayat village, Mysore Taluka, Mysore District, Karnataka, India
- Yadahalli, Tirumakudal Narsipur, a village in Tirumakudal Narsipur Taluka, Mysore District, Karnataka, India
