= P. P. Baburaj =

Indian social activist

Adv. P. P. Baburaj
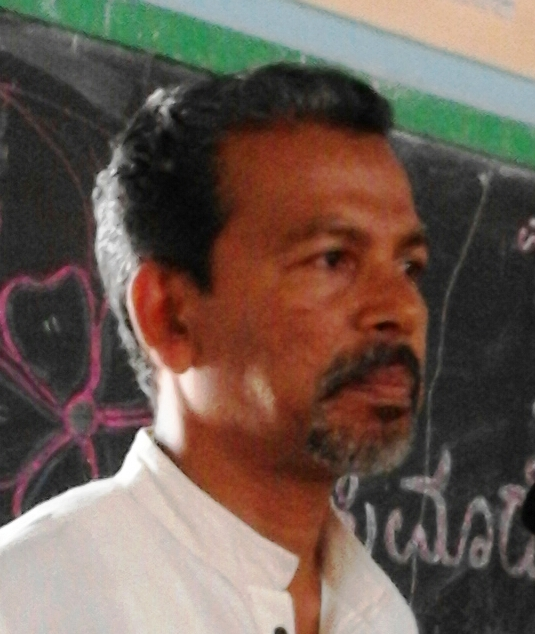
- Advocate P.P.Baburaj, Mysore
- Born: 1965 (age 60–61); Thrissur, Kerala, India
- Education: MA, LLB, PGDJC
- Known for: Health, Child Rights, Anti-corruption initiatives

Advocate P. P. Baburaj is a social activist and former judge based in Mysore, India. Baburaj is the Managing Trustee of People's Legal Forum, Mysore, which is a non-profit organization intervening in child labor issues.

== Child labor issues ==
Baburaj is actively involved in campaigns against child labor in India. He had conducted a campaign in 2014 against the government of Karnataka for not utilizing the funds received from the federal government for child welfare. The government has not spent any money for children rescued from workplaces during the last eight years. The Mysore district administration has received a total of Rs.314,000 for this purpose. According to Baburaj, 48 cases of child labour were recorded in Mysore district between 2004 and 2014.

== Training for police officers ==
In 2016, Baburaj conducted workshops for police officers of Karnataka state in the subject of child rights and juvenile justice system. The workshops were organized in collaboration with Karnataka State Commission of Protection of Child Rights (KSCPCR), District Legal Services Authority to sensitize the police officials in dealing with juvenile crimes.

== People's Legal Forum ==
Baburaj is the Managing Trustee of People's Legal Forum, Mysore a legal action group intervening in child rights and other humanitarian issues. http://mysorelegalforum.blogspot.in/ The Forum has also conducted a campaign against children being forced with heavy schoolbags and the campaign became successful when the Karnataka High Court initiated an action against heavy schoolbags.

== Campaign against corporal punishments in schools ==
Baburaj has conducted an internet campaign against corporal punishment in schools. It was done as a part of study of Child Welfare Committees of Karnataka state.

== Publications ==
Baburaj has published five books

- Zero Budget Natural farming in Malayalam language
- Child Protection and Juvenile Justice in Kannada language
- Healthy life without medicines in Kannada,
- Farmers in doldrums in Kannada, and
- Natural remedy for diabetes in Kannada (Translation from Malayalam).

He has started Palladan Publishing House and published a few books, including his daughter Emily Oshin's novella.

== Child Labour Amendment Bill 2016 ==
Baburaj has launched a campaign against the Child Labour Prhibition an Regulation Amendment Bill 2016 presented in the Indian Parliament. He argued that the bill makes 14 years of legal working age across all sectors but makes no such restrictions for children working in the family enterprise. He argued that children are also exploited in the entertainment industry losing their education altogether. Children are widely employed in India in farms, teastalls and roadside shops. Relaxing the rules for family business can mean children working in brick factories, welding shops and agricultural enterprises.

== See also ==
- People's Legal Forum, Mysore
