= Elwala =

- Village
- Location in Karnataka, India Elwala (India)
- Coordinates: 12.3573800°N 76.544390°E
- Country: India
- State: Karnataka
- District: Mysore
- Talukas: Mysore

Government
  - Body: Gram panchayat

Population (2001)
  - Total: 8,327

Languages
  - Official: Kannada
- Time zone: UTC+5:30 (IST)
- ISO 3166 code: IN-KA
- Vehicle registration: KA09
- Website: panchamitra.kar.nic.in/MainMenu.aspx?gp=1522004003&gpname=YELAWALA

Elwala or Elavaala is a village in the southern state of Karnataka, India. It is located in the Mysore taluk of Mysore district in Karnataka.

== Demographics ==
As of 2001 India census, Elwala had a population of 8327 with 4198 males and 4129 females.

== See also ==
- Mysore
- Districts of Karnataka
