= Danagalli =

Dhanagahalli
- village
- Location in Karnataka, India Dhanagahalli (India)
- Coordinates: 12.222790°N 76.5713900°E
- Country: India
- State: Karnataka
- District: Mysore
- Talukas: Mysore

Government
  - Type: karnataka
  - Body: panchayat

Population (2001)
  - Total: 5,881

Languages
  - Official: Kannada
- Time zone: UTC+5:30 (IST)
- Postal code: 570008
- ISO 3166 code: IN-KA
- Website: karnataka.gov.in

Dhanagahalli is a village in the southern state of Karnataka, India. It is located in the Mysore taluk of Mysore district.

== Demographics ==
As of 2001 India census, Dhanagalli had a population of 5881 with 3132 males and 2749 females.

== See also ==
- Districts of Karnataka
