= Belvata =

- village
- Location in Karnataka, India
- Coordinates: 12.353°N 76.646°E
- Country: India
- State: Karnataka
- District: Mysore

Population (2001)
  - Total: 5,627

Languages
  - Official: Kannada
- Time zone: UTC+5:30 (IST)

Belavatha Grama is a census town in Mysore district in the state of Karnataka, India.

== Demographics ==
As of 2001 India census, Belvata had a population of 5627. Males constitute 52% of the population and females 48%. Belvata has an average literacy rate of 72%, higher than the national average of 59.5%; with 55% of the males and 45% of females literate. 12% of the population is under 6 years of age.
