= Anandur =

Anandur or Anandura may refer to:

- Anandur, Karnataka, a village in Mysore Taluka, Mysore District, Karnataka, India
- Anandur, Krishnagiri, a village in Mathur block, Uthangarai Taluka, Krishnagiri District, Tamil Nadu, India
- Anandur, Ramanathapuram, a village in Rajasingamangalam block, Tiruvadanai Taluka, Ramanathapuram District, Tamil Nadu, India
