= People's Legal Forum, Mysore =

Indian non-profit organization

- Type: NPO
- Established: 2004
- Location: Mysore, Karnataka, India
- Website: http://mysorelegalforum.blogspot.in/

People's Legal Forum is an Indian non-profit organization from Mysore city. The organization was established in 2004. People's Legal Forum is a platform of young lawyers who are interested in safeguarding human rights and communal harmony.

== Activities ==
People's Legal Forum conducts seminars and signature campaigns against human right violations. Workshops are also conducted on child rights for students of Mysore city. The forum also fights government inaction in child labor issues. The forum also conducts training programs for police personnel of the provincial government for dealing with child rights issues.

== History ==
School dropout rate is very high in the Indian city of Mysore. More than a thousand school age children have already joined the workforce in Mysore. The reason for drop out is the unemployment of the parents, lack of housing and the apathy of the government towards the backward areas. Child abuse, child trafficking, child marriage and pornography are other related issues in the state of Karnataka.

== Blue Pencil Project ==
The Blue Pencil Project was introduced by the People's Legal Forum to give financial assistance to the needy schoolchildren. Under this scheme, a monthly support of INR.500 is given every month to needy students.

== Awards and honors ==
The Secretary of People's Legal Forum Advocate P.P.Baburaj was awarded a state award on child welfare in 2010. He was also assigned as the Project Director of Child Labour Elimination Project of the International Labor Organization in Chamarajanagar District. Advocate Baburaj also served as a magistrate in the Juvenile Justice Board, Karnataka.

== See also ==
- P. P. Baburaj
