= Gurumalleshwara =

Personal life
- Born: 20 July 1827. Devanuru, Nanjanagud, Mysore district, India
- Died: 25 June 1899. Devanuru, Nanjanagud, Mysore, India
- Honors: Niranjana Prabhu Swaroopi, Shatsthala Brahma, Nijaguna yOgi, Most venerated acharya (teacher) in the philosophy of Veerashaivism.

Religious life
- Religion: Hinduism
- Philosophy: Shunya siddantha

Religious career
- Teacher: Basavanna

Gurumalleshwara was a 19th-century Veerashaiva saint, Lingayat ascetic, Teacher of Shakti Vishishtadvaita and parama daasOhi. He was born in North Karnataka and came to Mysore and took penance under Bunde swamiji of Mahalingeshwara Mutt, Agrahara, Mysore. In later days he moved to Devanuru, Nanjangud talluk, Mysore, Karnataka, India and initiated a movement over there by his teachings and invented a new Veerashaiva Dasoha Mutt over there, . He is venerated as an avatar(incarnation) of Lord Nandi (the vahana of Supreme lord Shiva) and every Lingayat home in and around Mysore will have portraits of him without a single miss. His Mutt in Devanuru, is considered as a sect of Shri Srishailam Veerashaiva Mutt (one of the five major Lingayat pancha-peethas). He is believed to have received Linga deekshe directly from Bhagawan Renukacharya.

== Legends ==
1. It is believed that once there was an Anna daasoha (Serving food to all the visitors - bhaktas) in a Guru paadapooja Aradhana (A Lingayat tradition) ceremony happening in the mutt, they found scarcity for Ghee (As ghee is an integral part of Lingayat food), Seer himself went down to Kapila river and brought a bucket full of water but when he served it, the water had been turned into ghee.
2. It is also believed that He is avatar of Nandishwara (mount and carrier of Supreme Hindu Lord Shiva) after Basavanna.
