= Yadahalli, Belgaum =

Yadahalli
- Village
- Location in Karnataka, India Yadahalli (India)
- Coordinates: 12°21′56″N 76°53′15″E
- Country: India
- State: Karnataka
- District: Belgaum

Languages
  - Official: Kannada
- Time zone: UTC+5:30 (IST)
- PIN: 591304

Yadahalli is a village in Belgaum district in the southern state of Karnataka, India.
