= Anandur, Karnataka =

Anandur
- village
- Location in Karnataka, India Anandur (India)
- Coordinates: 12°24′47″N 076°32′08″E
- Country: India
- State: Karnataka
- District: Mysore
- Taluka: Mysore

Government
  - Type: Panchayat raj
  - Body: Gram panchayat

Population (2001)
  - Total: 1,570

Languages
  - Official: Kannada
- Time zone: UTC+5:30 (IST)
- ISO 3166 code: IN-KA
- Vehicle registration: KA
- Website: karnataka.gov.in

Anandur is a panchayat village in Mysore Taluka, Mysore District, Karnataka, India.

== Geography ==
Anandur is located in the far northwest of Mysore District, bordered to the southeast by Koorgalli panchayat village, to the southwest and west by Gungralchatra panchayat village, and to the north and east by the Krishna Raja Sagara with Mandya District across the reservoir.

== Governance ==
Anandur is the gram panchayat with administration over Anandur village and Chikkanahalli, Kallinathapura, Kallurunaganahalli, Kallurunaganahalli Kaval, Subramanyapura, Undavadi, Yadahalli villages as well. In December 2012, Vijayalakshmi Manju was elected as chairperson of the Anandur gram panchayat.

== Demographics ==
As of 2001 census, Anandur panchayat area had 6,882 inhabitants, with 3,474 males and 3,408 females. The village of Anandur had 1,570 inhabitants, with 806 males and 764 females.
