= Mysore district =

- District of Karnataka
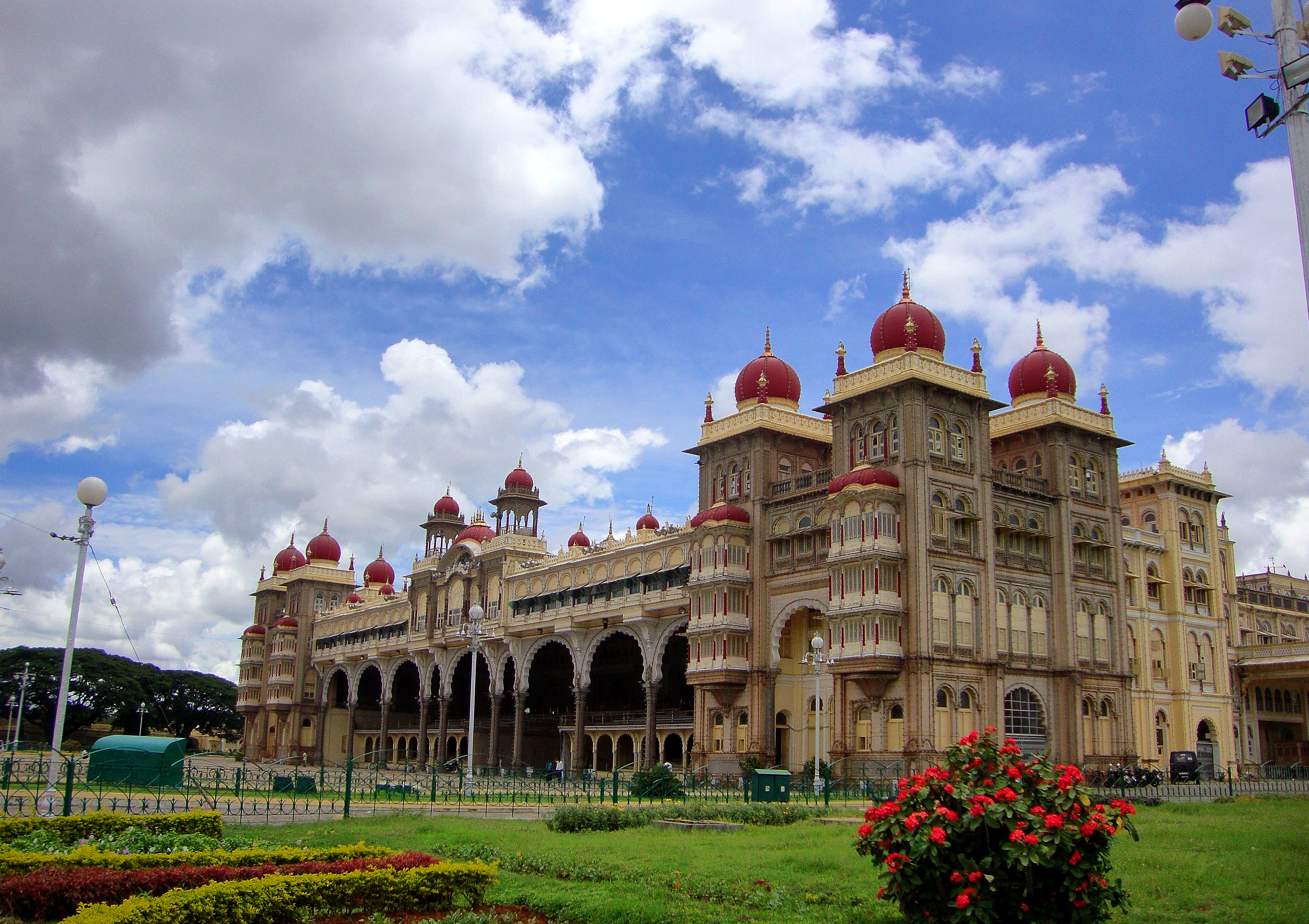
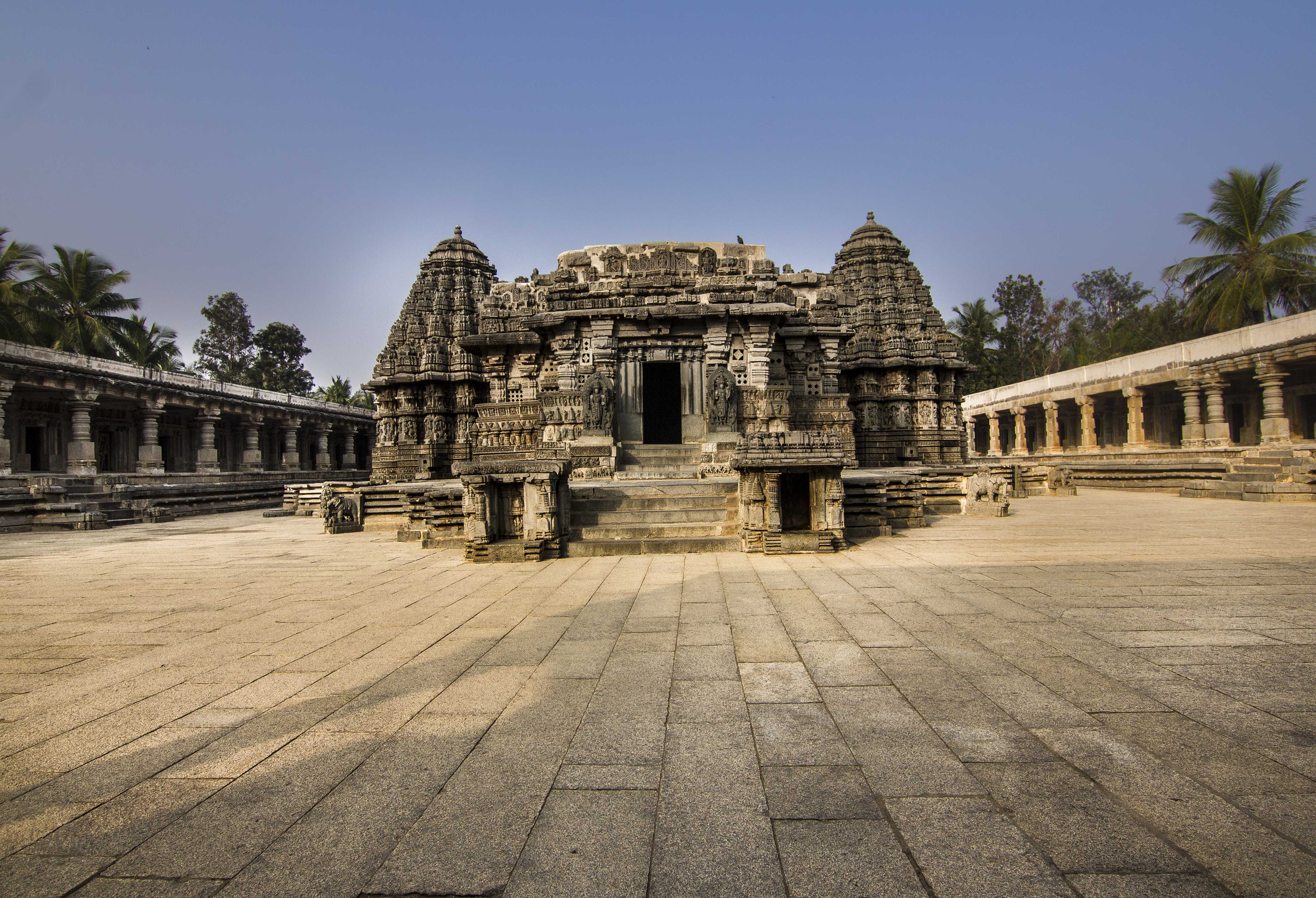
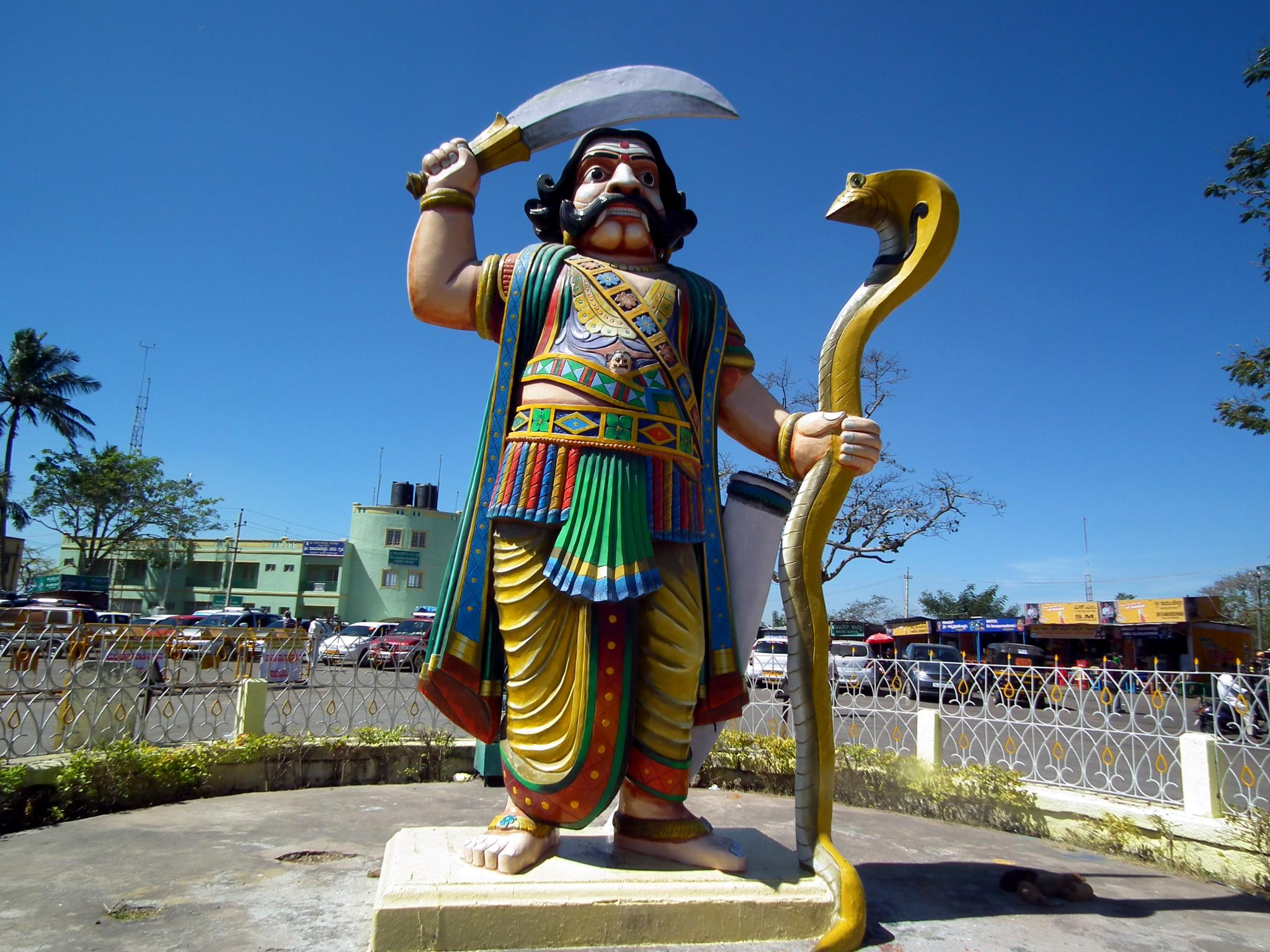
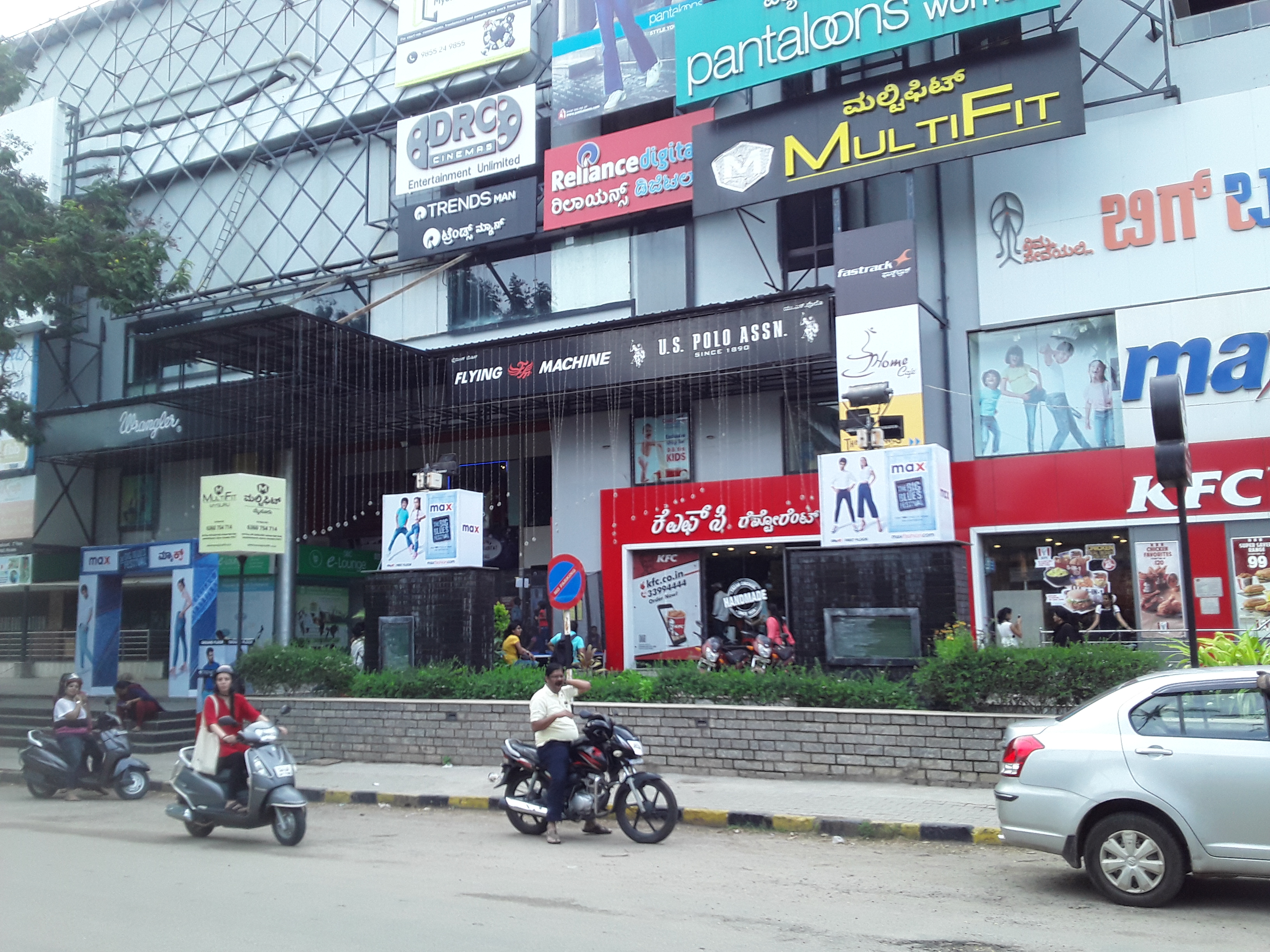
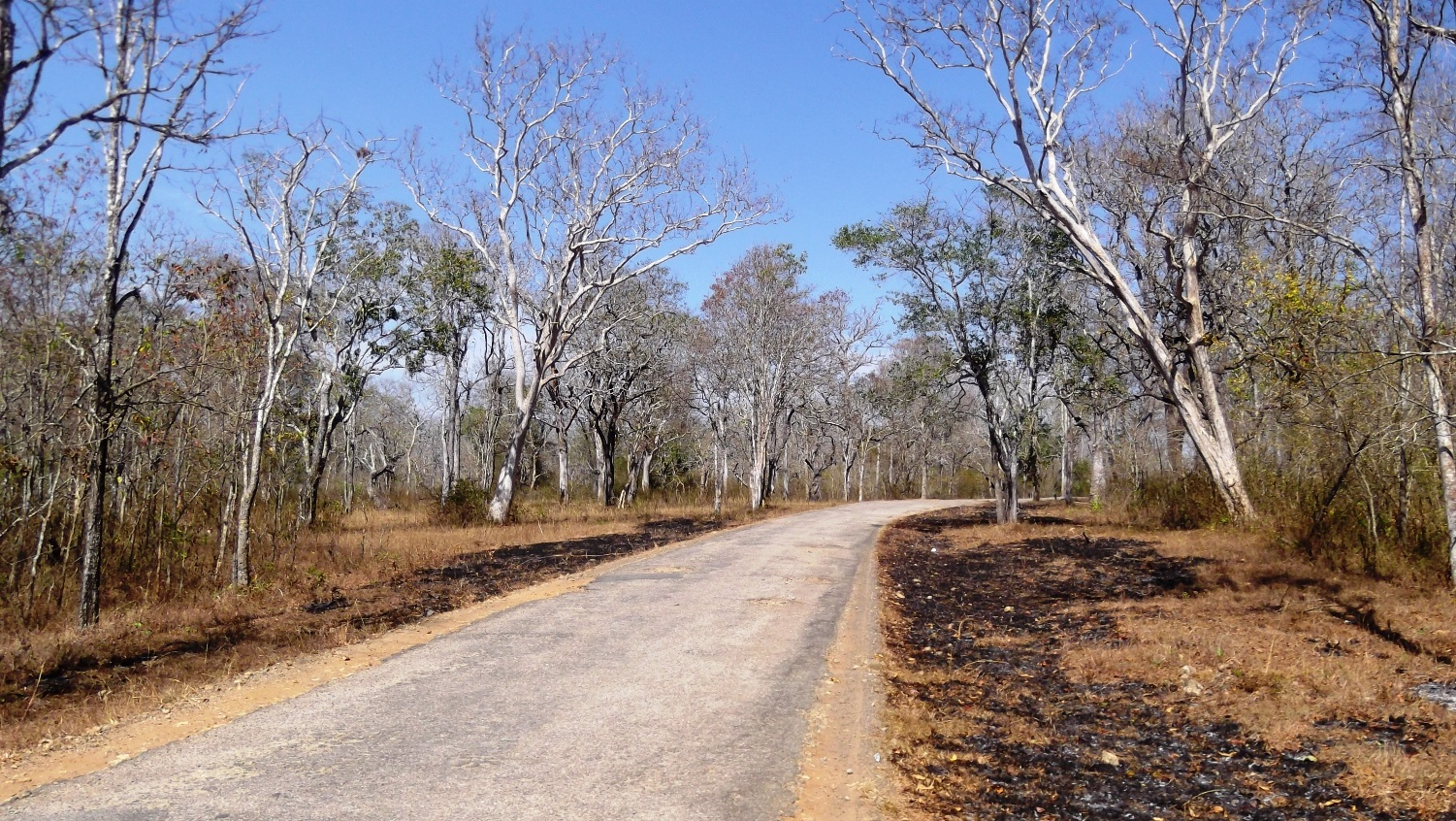
- Clockwise from top-left; Mysore Palace, Chennakeshava Temple, Somanathapura, Mall in Jayalakshmipuram, Nagarhole Tiger Reserve and Mahishasura Statue near Chamundeshwari Temple
- Nickname: Kaveri Nadu
- Location in Karnataka
- Coordinates: 12.21°N 76.49°E
- Country: India
- State: Karnataka
- Division: Mysore division
- Headquarters: Mysore
- Taluks: Mysore, Tirumakudalu Narasipura, Nanjangud, Heggadadevanakote, Hunsur, Piriyapatna, Krishnarajanagara, Sargur, Saligrama

Government
  - Type: state govt.
  - Deputy Commissioner (Collector): Lakshmikanth Reddy G., I.A.S
  - Police Commissioner, Mysuru City: Seema Latkar, I.P.S
  - Superintendent of Police (Rural): Vishnuvardhana N., I.P.S

Area
  - Total: 6,854 km^{2} (2,646 sq mi)
- Elevation: 746 m (2,448 ft)

Population (2011)
  - Total: 3,001,127
  - Density: 437.9/km^{2} (1,134/sq mi)

Languages
  - Official: Kannada
- Time zone: UTC+5:30 (IST)
- ISO 3166 code: IN-KA
- Vehicle registration: KA-09, KA-45, KA-55
- Website: mysore.nic.in

Mysore district, officially Mysuru district, is an administrative district located in the southern part of the state of Karnataka, India. It is the administrative headquarters of Mysore division. and Mandya District was carved out of the original larger Mysore district in 1939. During state reorganisation, Kollegala was transferred from Coimbatore district. Then in 1997 a new district, Chamarajanagar district, was carved out of Mysore. Mysore district is bounded by Chamrajanagar district to the southeast, Mandya district to the east and northeast, Wayanad district of Kerala to the south, Kodagu district to the west, and Hassan district to the north.

This district has a prominent place in the history of Karnataka; Mysore was ruled by the Wodeyars from the year 1399 till the independence of India in the year 1947. It features many tourist destinations, from Mysore Palace to Nagarhole National Park. It is the third-most populous district in Karnataka (out of 31), after Bangalore Urban and Belgaum.

== Etymology ==
Mysore district gets its name from the city of Mysore which is also the headquarters of the district. The original name of this city was Mahishapura derived from a demon named Mahishasura. A statue of Mahishasura and a temple dedicated to Goddess Chamundeshwari on the top of Chamundi Hill near Mysore city, relate to the legend of its origin.

== History ==
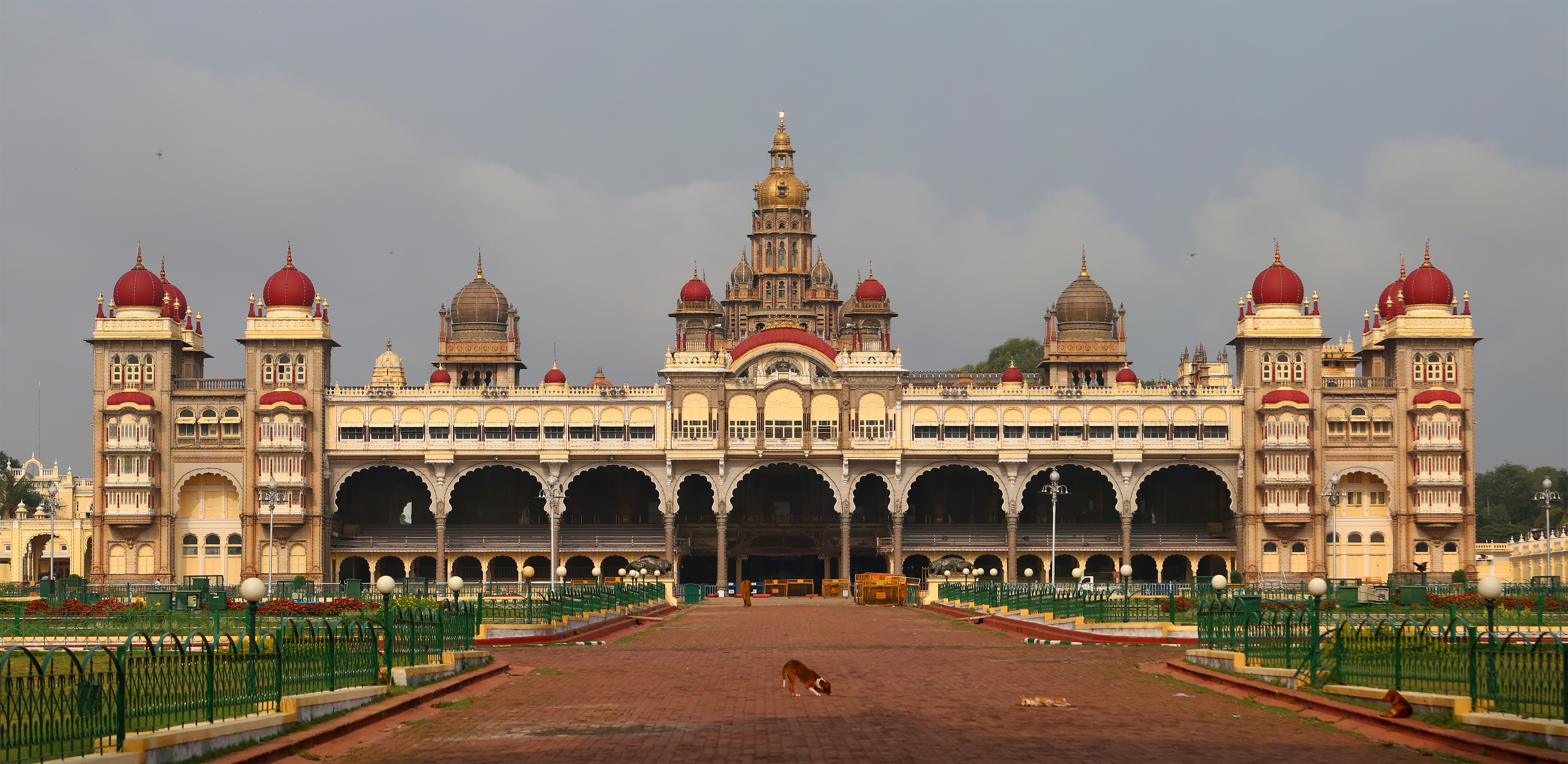
Mysore Palace

The earliest known reference of rulers in Mysore district are the Gangas who during the rule of King Avinitha (469-529 CE), moved the capital from Kolar to Talakadu on the banks of the river Kaveri in the Tirumakudalu Narasipura taluk. Talakadu remained their regal capital till the end of Ganga rule in the early 11th century. Gangas ruled over a greater part of Mysore district, then known by the name of Gangavadi. In the end of the 8th century, the Rashtrakuta king Dhruva Dharavarsha defeated the Ganga king Shivamara II and wrested Gangavadi from him. Gangavadi came under the governorship of Kambarasa, the son of Dhruva Dharavarsha. Gangas who were overthrown from Gangavadi, had to wait till their king Nitimarga Ereganga (853–869 CE) won a victory against the Rashtrakutas at Rajaramudu. Seeing the increasing might of the Gangas, the Rashtrakuta King Amoghavarsha I gave his daughter Revakanimmadi in marriage to the son of Ereganga, Butuga II who became the ruler of Gangavadi. Gangas ruled over Gangavadi till the Ganga king, Rakkasa Ganga (985–1024 CE) was defeated by the Cholas.

In the year 1117, Vishnuvardhana, the great king of Hoysala dynasty seized Gangavathi and its capital Talakad from the Cholas. To commemorate this achievement, Vishnuvardhana built the Keerthinarayana temple at Talakad. Gangavadi was ruled by the Hoysalas till the death of their last ruler, Veera Ballala III after which Gangavadi became a part of the Vijayanagara Empire. In 1399, Yaduraya established the Wodeyar dynasty at Mysore. It remained as a feudatory to the Vijayanagara Empire owing allegiance to the Vijayanagara kings and the Vijayanagara representative at Srirangapatna, till the fall of the Vijayanagara Empire in 1565 CE. In the vacuum that was created, Raja Wodeyar I (1578–1617) established control and became the first major ruler of the Wodeyar family. He defeated the Vijayanagara representative in a battle at Kesare near Mysore, shifted his capital from Mysore to Srirangapatna in 1610 AD.

The Wodeyars continued to rule over Mysore till the reign of Krishnaraja Wodeyar II (1734–1766), when Hyder Ali Khan and his son Tipu Sultan became the virtual rulers of Mysore. Though there were Wodeyar kings during the rule of Hyder Ali and Tipu Sultan, they were mere figureheads. With the death of Tipu Sultan in 1799 under the hands of the British, the Wodeyars were reinstated to the throne of Mysore and the capital was shifted back to Mysore. Prince Krishnaraja Wodeyar III who was just 5 years old was installed on the throne of Mysore in 1799. Wodeyars were the subsidiaries of the British Empire and had to pay annual subsidies. During the rule of Krishnaraja Wodeyar III, the British took the kingdom back from Wodeyars in 1831 under the pretext that the Wodeyar king did not pay the annual subsidy. Commissioners were appointed to rule over the Mysore kingdom. Mark Cubbon (Cubbon Road and Cubbon Park in Bangalore city are named after him) and L. B. Bowring (Bowring Hospital in Bangalore city is named after him) were the prominent British Commissioners who ruled over Mysore. However, the Wodeyar kings raised a plea against this with the British Parliament who gave a ruling favour of the Wodeyars. In 1881, Chamaraja Wodeyar IX (son of Krishnaraja Wodeyar III and Wodeyar king since 1868) was given back the reins of the Mysore kingdom from the British. The Wodeyars continued to rule over the Mysore Kingdom, till the rule of Jayachamaraja Wodeyar who, in the year 1947, merged his kingdom into the new dominion of independent India. He remained as a Maharaja till India became a republic in the year 1950 after which he was anointed as a Raja Pramukh (a constitutional position) as the head of Mysore state till 1956. In 1956, after the reorganisation of Indian states, the Mysore state was born and Jayachamaraja Wodeyar was made as the governor of this state – the position he held until 1964.

== Geography ==
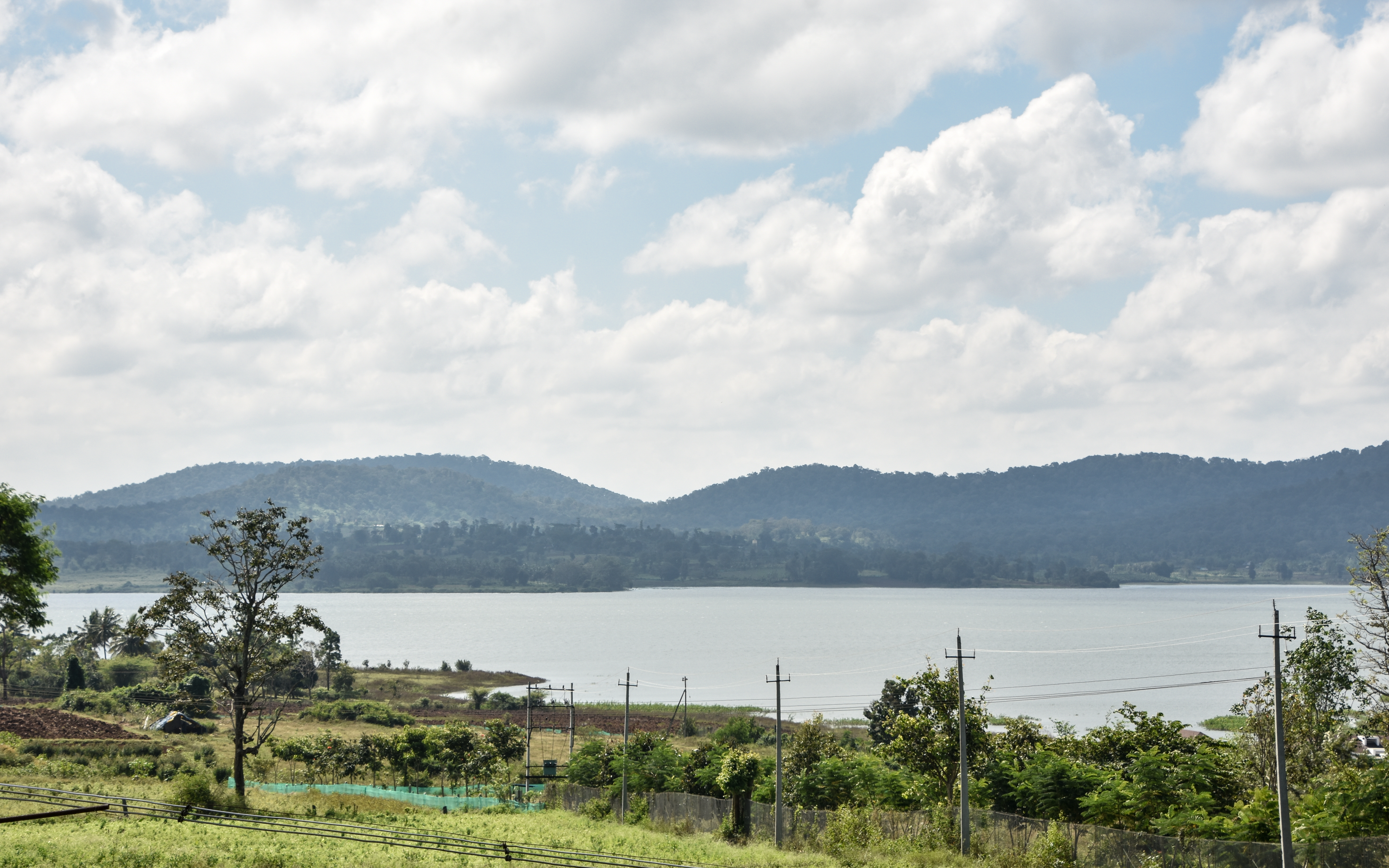
Undulating terrain near Kabini reservoir in SW Mysore district

Mysore district is located between latitude 11°45' to 12°40' N and longitude 75°57' to 77°15' E. It is bounded by Mandya district to the northeast, Chamrajanagar district to the southeast, Kerala state to the south, Kodagu district to the west, and Hassan district to the north. It has an area of 6,854 km^{2} (ranked 12th in the state). The administrative centre of Mysore District is Mysore City. The district is a part of Mysore division. Prior to 1998, Mysore district also contained the Chamarajanagar district before that area was separated off.

The district lies on the undulating table land of the southern Deccan plateau, within the watershed of the Kaveri River, which flows through the northwestern and eastern parts of the district. The Krishna Raja Sagara reservoir, which was formed by building a dam across the Kaveri, lies on the northern edge of the district. Nagarhole National Park lies partly in Mysore district and partly in adjacent Kodagu District.

The district is undulating with only a few isolated peaks. These include Chamundi Hill (1,080 m (3,540 ft) above MSL) and Bettadapura hill (1,320 m (4,330 ft) above MSL) in Periyapatna Taluk. The latter is the highest mountain peak in Mysore district.

=== Climate ===
The temperature in the district varies from 15 °C in winters to 35 °C in summers. Mysore district receives an average rainfall of 885 mm.

In 2022, Mysore district received an average annual rainfall of 1,318 millimetres (51.9 in) (an excess of 57%). The top three highest rainfall receiving hoblis were:

1. Mirle - 1,657 millimetres (65.2 in)
2. Bannur - 1,481 millimetres (58.3 in)
3. Hosa Agrahara - 1,454 millimetres (57.2 in)

=== Geology ===
The types of soil found in this district are red soils (red gravelly loam soil, red loam soil, red gravelly clay soil, red clay soil), lateritic soil, deep black soil, saline alluvio-colluvial soil and brown forest soil. Some of the minerals found in this district are kyanite, sillimanite, quartz, magnesite, chromite, soapstone, felsite, corundum, graphite, limestone, dolomite, siliconite and dunite

== Demographics ==
Historical population
Year	Pop.	±% p.a.
1901	589,987	—
1911	608,961	+0.32%
1921	624,889	+0.26%
1931	678,700	+0.83%
1941	788,657	+1.51%
1951	975,193	+2.15%
1961	1,137,640	+1.55%
1971	1,460,736	+2.53%
1981	1,827,702	+2.27%
1991	2,281,653	+2.24%
2001	2,641,027	+1.47%
2011	3,001,127	+1.29%

Religions in Mysore district (2011)
Religion	Percent
Hinduism	87.70%
Islam	9.68%
Christianity	1.31%
Buddhism	0.54%
Jainism	0.48%
Other or not stated	0.29%

Languages of Mysore district (2011)
1. Kannada (80.8%)
2. Urdu (9.27%)
3. Telugu (2.91%)
4. Tamil (2.22%)
5. Marathi (1.12%)
6. Hindi (0.92%)
7. Others (2.75%)

According to the 2011 census Mysore district has a population of 3,001,127, roughly equal to the nation of Armenia or the US state of Mississippi. This gives it a ranking of 125th in India (out of a total of 640). The district has a population density of 437 inhabitants per square kilometre (1,130/sq mi) . Its population growth rate over the decade 2001-2011 was 13.39%. Mysore has a sex ratio of 982 females for every 1000 males, and a literacy rate of 72.56%. 41.50% of the population lives in urban areas. Scheduled Castes and Scheduled Tribes make up 17.88% and 11.15% of the population respectively. Some of the more ancient forest tribes are Jenu Kuruba, Betta Kuruba, Paniya, Yereva and Soliga.

Hindus constitute 87.70% of the population with Muslims making up 9.68% of the population; the remaining part of the population is made up by Christians, Buddhists and other religious groups.

At the time of the 2011 census, 80.81% of the population spoke Kannada, 9.27% Urdu, 2.91% Telugu, 2.22% Tamil, 1.12% Marathi and 0.92% Hindi as their first language.

== Government and administration ==
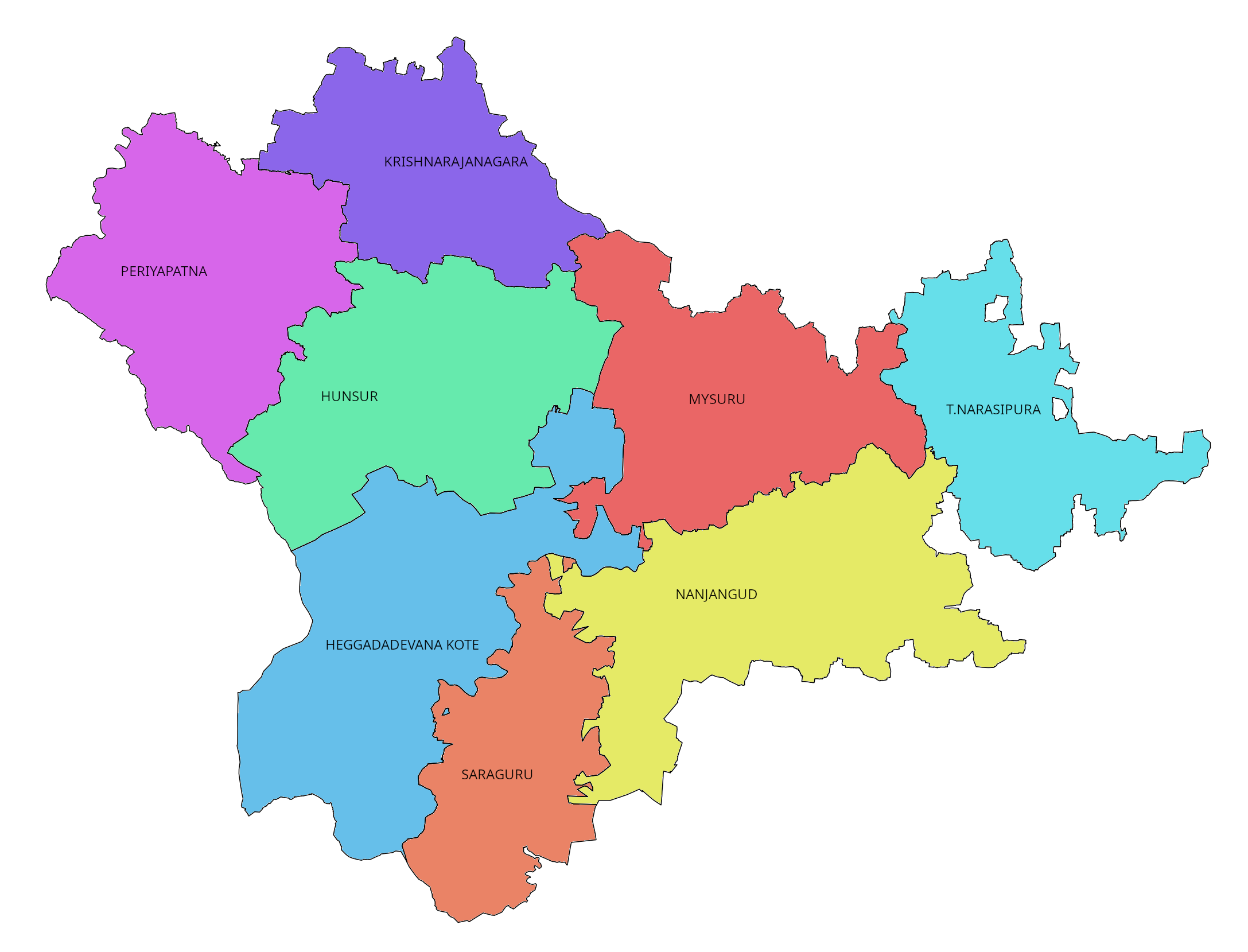
Map of Mysore District, 2020

Skyline of Hootagalli, suburb of Mysore City and a CMC

Assembly Constituencies of Mysore district

Mysore district is divided into three subdivisions, Nanjangud, Mysore and Hunsur. The Mysore district administration is headed by the Deputy Commissioner who also has the additional role of a District Magistrate. Assistant Commissioners, Tahsildars, Shirastedars (revenue official at Tahsil level), Revenue inspectors and Village Accountants help the Deputy Commissioner in the administration of the district. Mysore city is the headquarters of the district. It lies on the north eastern part of the district and is well known for its beautiful palaces and also for the festivities that take place during Dasara.

Mysore District is subdivided into nine taluks:

- Piriyapatna
- Hunsur
- Krishnarajanagara
- Mysore
- Heggadadevanakote
- Nanjangud
- Saragur
- Tirumakudalu Narasipura
- Saligrama

Mysore district has 1 Municipal Corporation, 3 City Municipal Councils, 5 Town Municipal Councils and 6 Town Panchayats.

- Mysore City Corporation
- Hootagalli CMC
- Hunasuru CMC
- Nanjangud CMC
- K.R Nagar TMC
- T.Narsipura TMC
- Bannur TMC
- H.D Kote TMC
- Periyapatna TMC
- Bogadhi TP
- Rammanahalli TP
- Srirampura TP
- Kadakola TP
- Saragur TP
- Saligrama TP

Mysore district elects 11 members to the Legislative Assembly of the State of Karnataka. The 11 assembly constituencies are:

- Chamaraja, Krishnaraja, Narasimharaja and Chamundeshwari (belonging to Mysore city)
- Varuna (belonging to Nanjangud and Tirumakudalu Narasipura)
- Hunsur
- Piriyapatna
- Krishnarajanagara
- Heggadadevanakote
- Nanjangud
- Tirumakudalu Narasipura

Mysore district also elects 1 member to the Lok Sabha, the lower house of the Indian Parliament. The Mysore Lok Sabha constituency consists of all the Assembly constituencies mentioned above except for Nanjangud, Tirumakudalu Narasipura, K.R.Nagara and H.D.Kote which belong to the Chamarajanagar Lok Sabha constituency.

=== Seat of administration ===
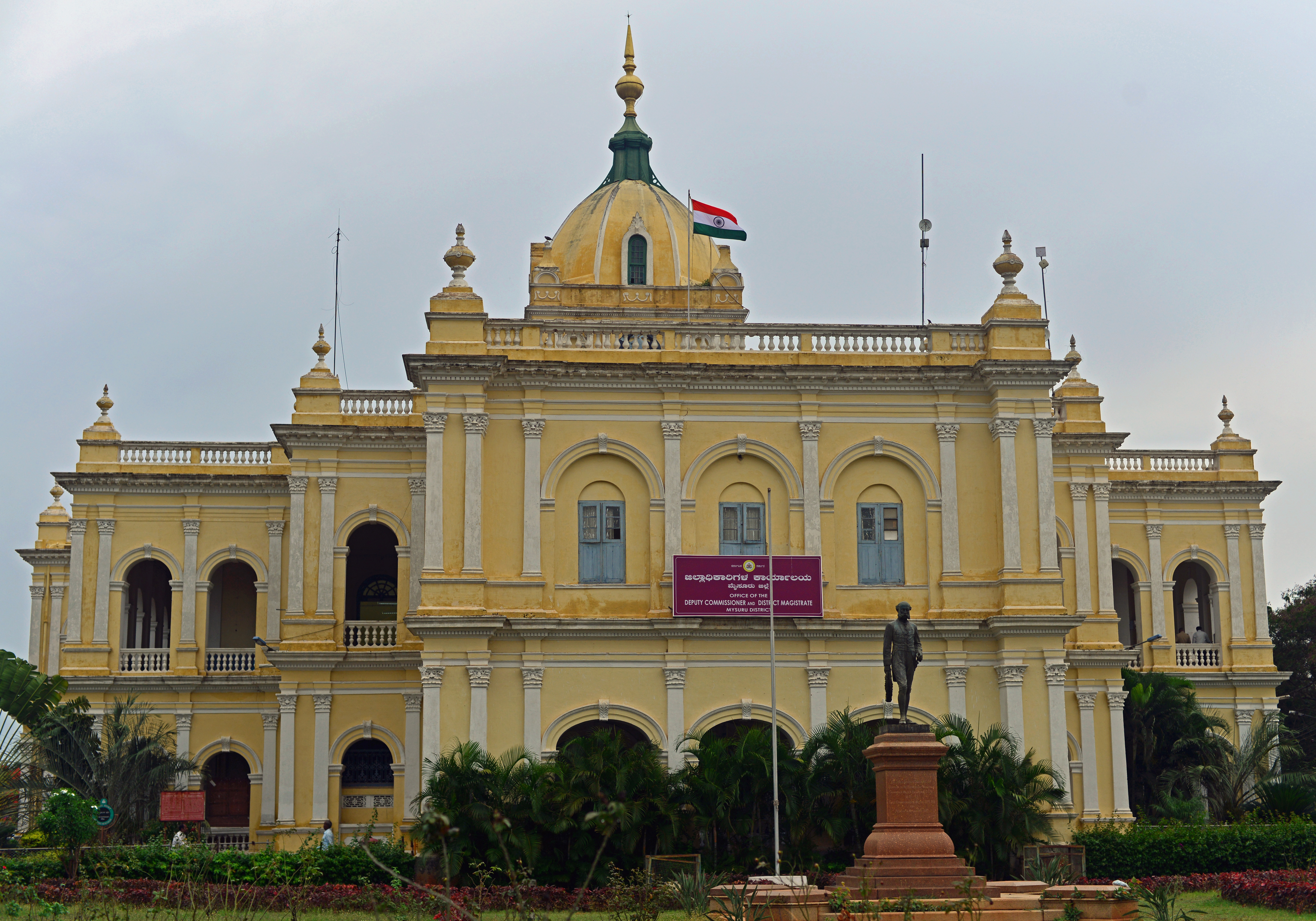
The old DC office, a heritage building

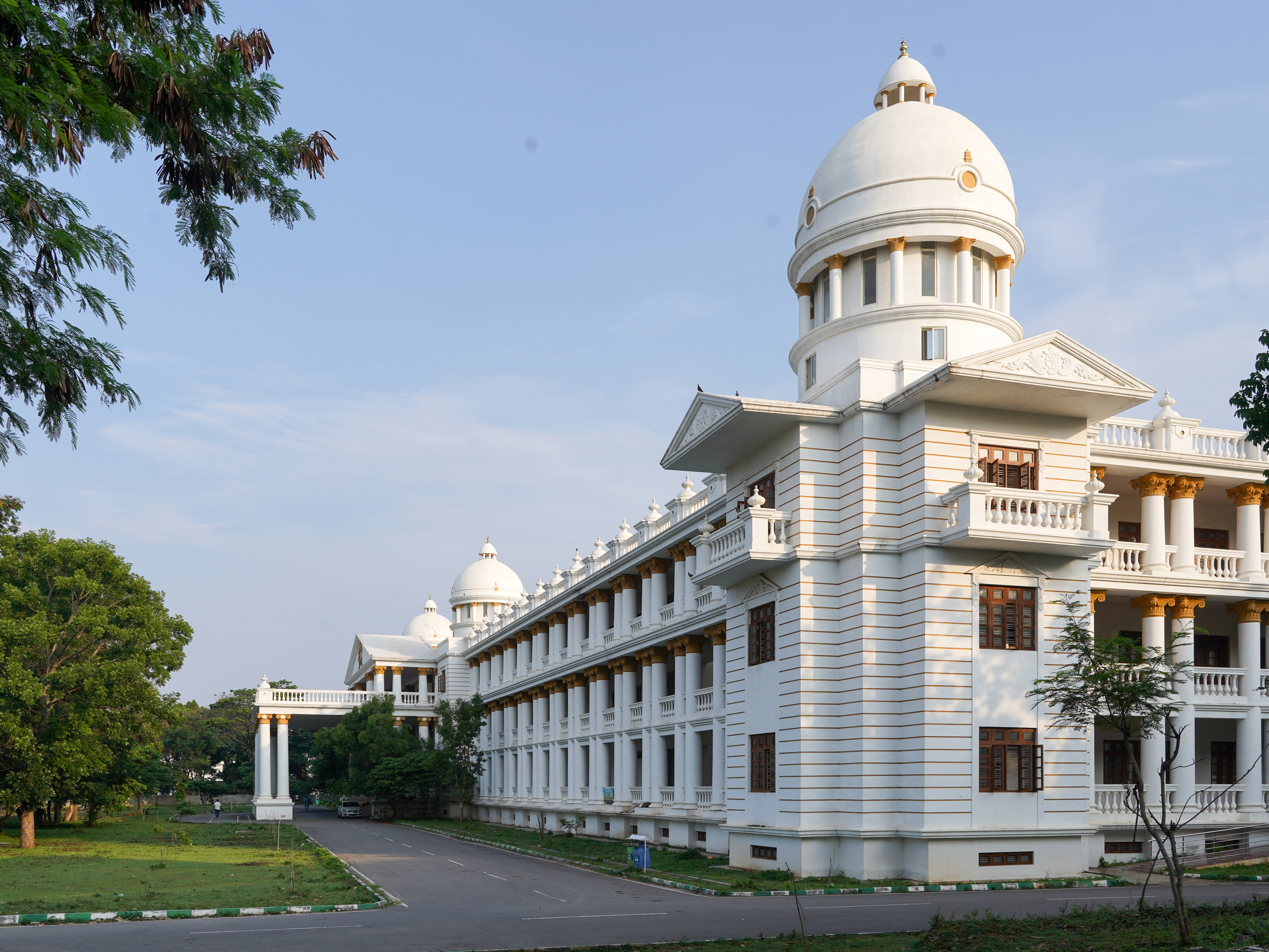
The new DC office

The seat of the administrative head for 128 years was a heritage building constructed in 1895 on Krishnaraja Boulevard. In order to decongest the old office, a new office was constructed on a 15 acres (6.1 ha) plot in Siddhartha Nagar at a cost of Rs. 670 million (67 crores). The three storey building resembles the Lalitha Mahal Palace Hotel. It has a built-up area of 13,720 m^{2} (147,700 sq ft). In addition, there is basement parking of 9,150 m^{2} (98,500 sq ft). The total area of 23,000 m^{2} (250,000 sq ft) is 3-4 times larger than the old office. The foundation stone was laid in October 2016 and building was inaugurated on 10 March 2018, when Siddaramaiah was the Chief Minister. However, with the change of government a few weeks later, the office lay vacant for several years. On 8 June 2023, soon after Siddaramaiah became Chief Minister again, the Deputy Commissioner shifted his office to the new building.

=== List of Deputy Commissioners ===
Deputy Commissioners of Mysore District
Name	Tenure	Remarks
P. Manivannan	28 January 2008 - 26 May 2010	
Harsha Gupta	26 May 2010 - 8 June 2011	
P S Vastrad	9 June 2011 - 25 November 2012	
Naga Nayak	December 2012 - 30 January 2013	
Dr. Ramegowda	30 January 2013 - 27 March 2013	
Naga Nayak	27 March 2013 - 18 July 2013	
C. Shikha	18 July 2013 - 8 December 2016	
D. Randeep	8 December 2016 - 8 March 2018	
T. Yogesh	8 March 2018 - 12 March 2018	
K. B. Sivakumar	12 March 2018 - 17 April 2018	
Darpan Jain	17 April 2018 - 30 April 2018	
Abhiram G. Sankar	30 April 2018 - 28 August 2020	
B. Sharat	29 August 2020 - 28 September 2020	
Rohini Sindhuri Dasari	29 September 2020 - 7 June 2021	
Dr. Bagadi Gautham	7 June 2021 – 27 October 2022	
Dr. Rajendra .K V	27 October 2022 - Present	

== Economy ==
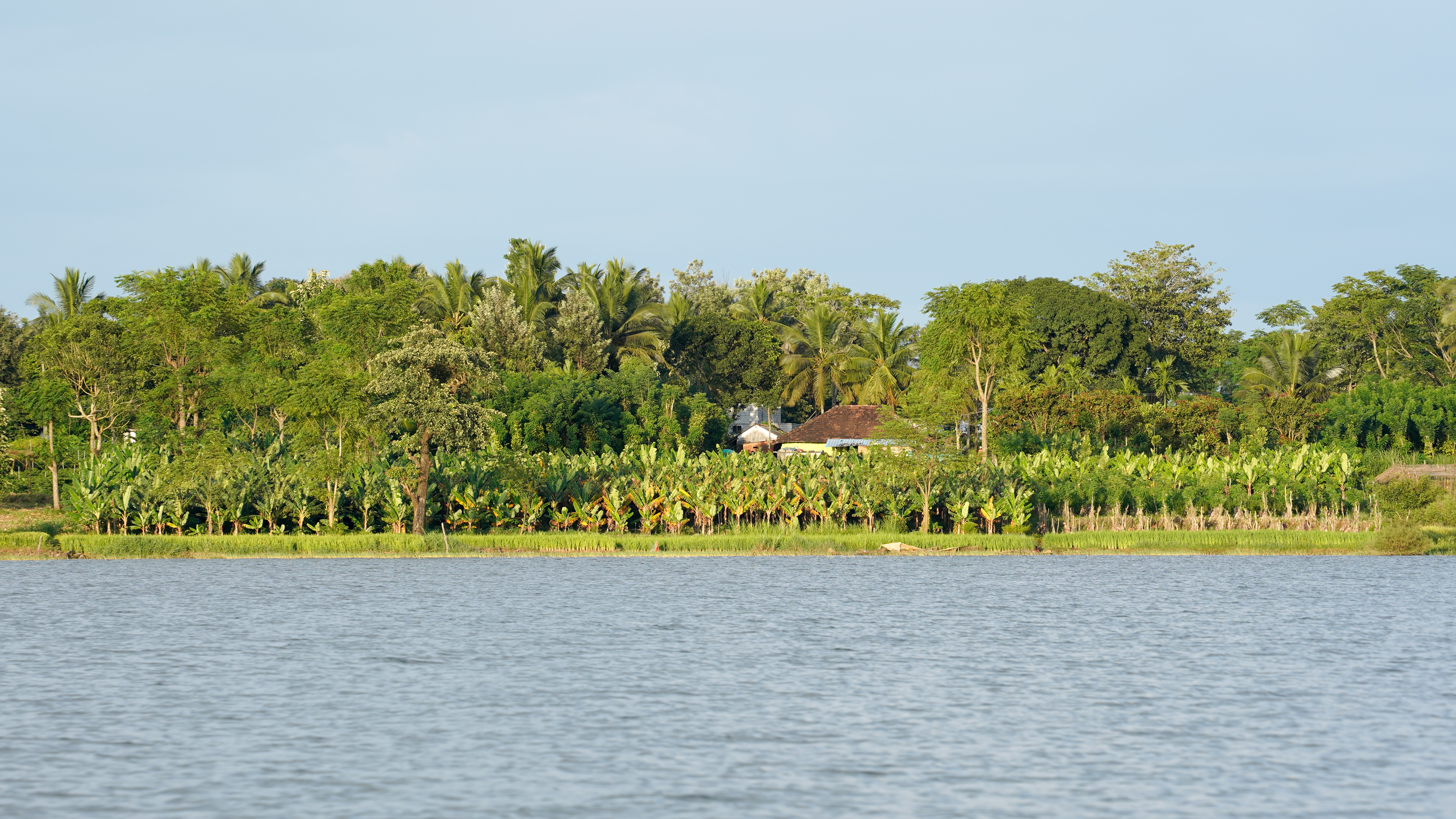
Banana and coconut cultivated on the bank of the Kabini reservoir

=== Agriculture ===
Agriculture is the backbone of the economy of this district as it is with the rest of India. Though the agriculture is highly dependent on the rainfall, about 45% of the sown area is irrigated. The principal means of irrigation are canals from the rivers Kaveri and Kabini rivers and tubewells. According to the 2001 census, about 3,25,823 farmers are involved in cultivation in this district. In the year 2001–2002, Mysore district yielded a food grain production of 608,596 Tonnes which is a contribution of 6.94% of the total food grain production in the state for the year. Some of the important crops grown here are cotton, grams, groundnut, jowar, maize, ragi, rice, sugarcane, sunflower and tur. Horticulture is another area contributing significantly to the economy. The principal fruits by area are banana and mango. By production, banana, mango, papaya and sapota are the main fruits.

=== Industries ===
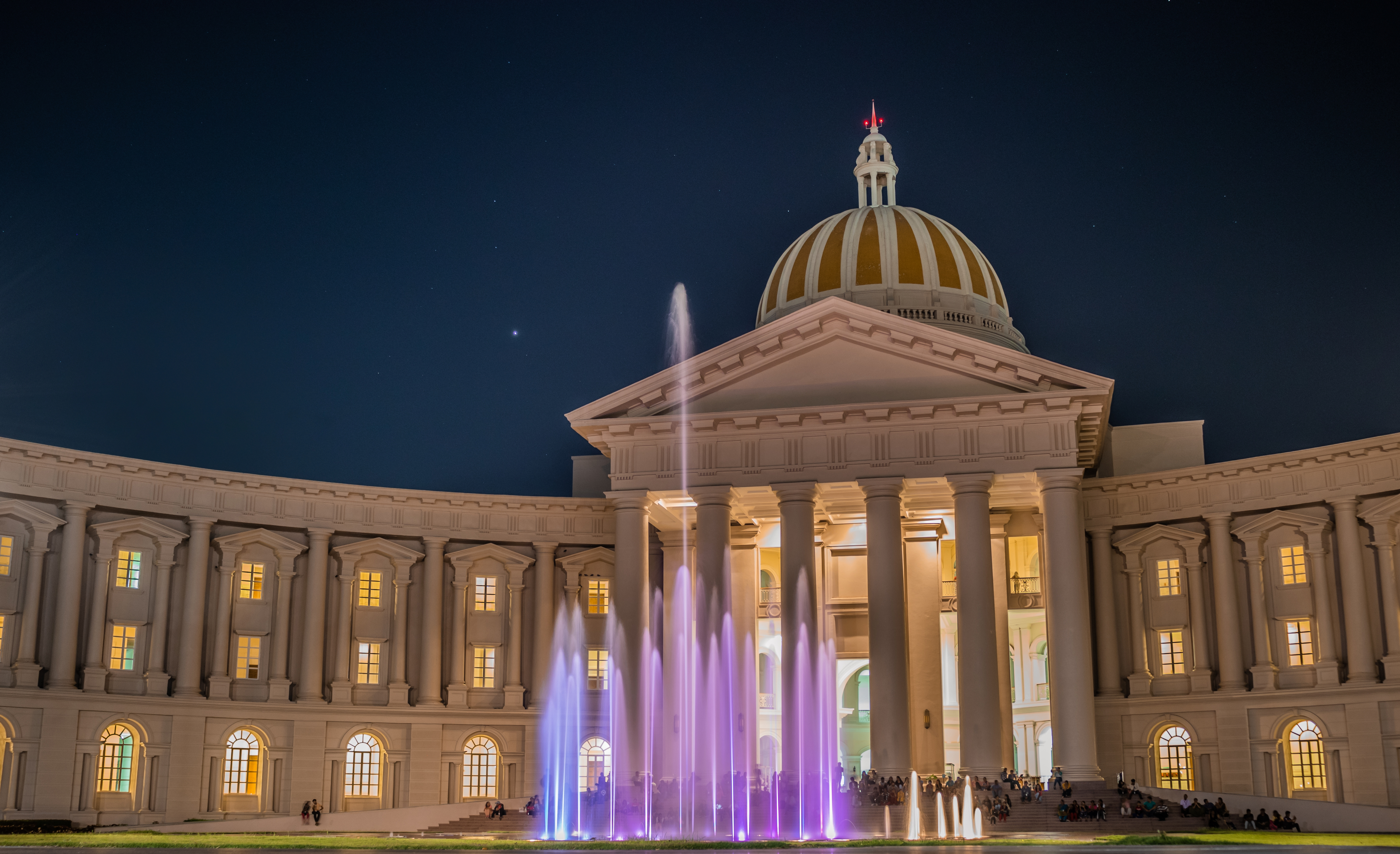
Infosys in Hebbal Industrial Area, Hootagalli, Mysore

Industries in Mysore district are mainly concentrated around the cities of Mysore and Nanjangud. Karnataka Industrial Areas Development Board (KIADB) has established two industrial estates as Mysore and Nanjangud and established six industrial areas in Mysore district to encourage Industrial Development of the district. These are located at Belagola, Belawadi, Hebbal (Electronic City) and Hootagalli of Mysore Industrial estate and the industrial areas Nanjangud and Thandavapura of Nanjangud industrial estate.

The first major industry to be set up in Mysore with the partnership of the Maharaja of Mysore when Mysore was still an industrially backward district in 1960 was the now defunct Ideal Jawa India Ltd. motorcycle factory with technical collaboration with Jawa Motors of Czechoslovakia.

Some of the major industries located near Mysore city are:

- Mysore Polymers & Rubber Products Ltd. (MYPOL) - Manufacturer of Rubber Products
- JK Tyres Ltd. - Manufacturer of tyres
- Automotive Axles Ltd. - Manufacturer of axles
- Bharat Earth Movers Ltd. (BEML) - Manufacturer of heavy machinery
- Karnataka Silk Industries Corporation (KSIC) - Manufacturer of silk garments
- TVS Ltd. - Manufacturer of motor vehicles and parts (Near Nanjangud, Mysore Taluk)
- Larsen & Toubro (Manufacturer of medical equipments and Electronic meters)

Some of the major industries located in Nanjangud are:

- Dunford Fabrics (Closed)
- VKC Sandals (India) Private Limited
- Nestle India Ltd.
- Ray Hans Technologies
- AT&S India Pvt Ltd.
- TVS Motor Company
- Bannari Amman Sugars Ltd.
- South India Paper Mills
- Indus Fila
- S Kumars Now --> Reid & Taylor
- Raman Boards
- REI Electronics
- Jubilant Life sciences limited
- Brakes (India)
- Bacardi RUM, Gemini Distilleries Pvt Ltd.
- Zenith Textiles
- Kottakal Arya Vaidyasala
- Supreem Pharmaceuticals Mysore Pvt Ltd.,
- ITC (Tobacco Processing)
- United Breweries (Upcoming)

=== Information technology ===
Mysore is proving to be the next IT hub in Karnataka after the phenomenal success of Bangalore. The government of India has recognised Mysore as number one among the 20 Tier II cities of India for the promotion of the IT industry. Currently, all of the IT related industries are concentrated around Mysore city. The Software Technology Park (STP) in Mysore was inaugurated in 1998 by the prime minister of India, Atal Bihari Vajpayee. As of August 2006, there are 42 companies registered with the STP. Software exports from Mysore were expected to double to about Rs. 850 crores in the financial year 2006-07 from previous year's exports of Rs. 400 crores. Some of the major IT companies located here are:

- Wipro Infotech
- Aris Global Pvt Ltd
- WeP Peripherals Ltd. (earlier known as Wipro ePeripherals Ltd.)
- Infosys
- Software Paradigms (India)
- Larsen & Toubro
- Infomaze

=== Tourism ===
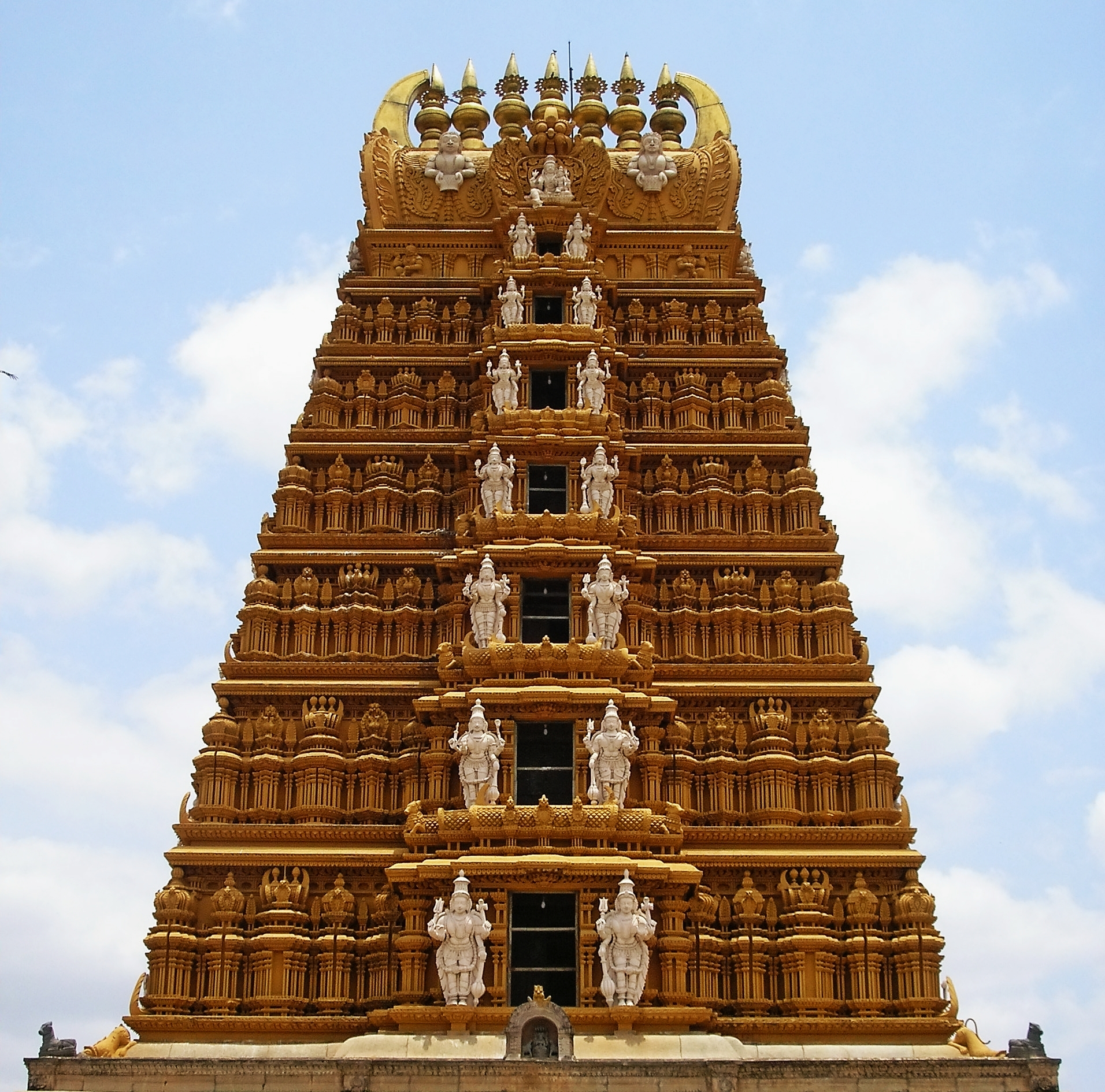
Srikanteshwara Temple, Nanjangud

Tourism is another big industry in Mysore. Its importance as a tourist destination was evident when it was selected as the venue for the Karnataka Tourism Expo in 2006. Though Mysore city is well known as a tourist place, other parts the district are yet to see growth in tourism. However, the tourism department plans to develop other areas like Nanjangud, Bettadapura, Hedathali, Kapadi, Mudukuthore Betta, Mugur and Tirumakudalu Narasipura as tourist places.

== Gallery ==
Gokulam, Mysore

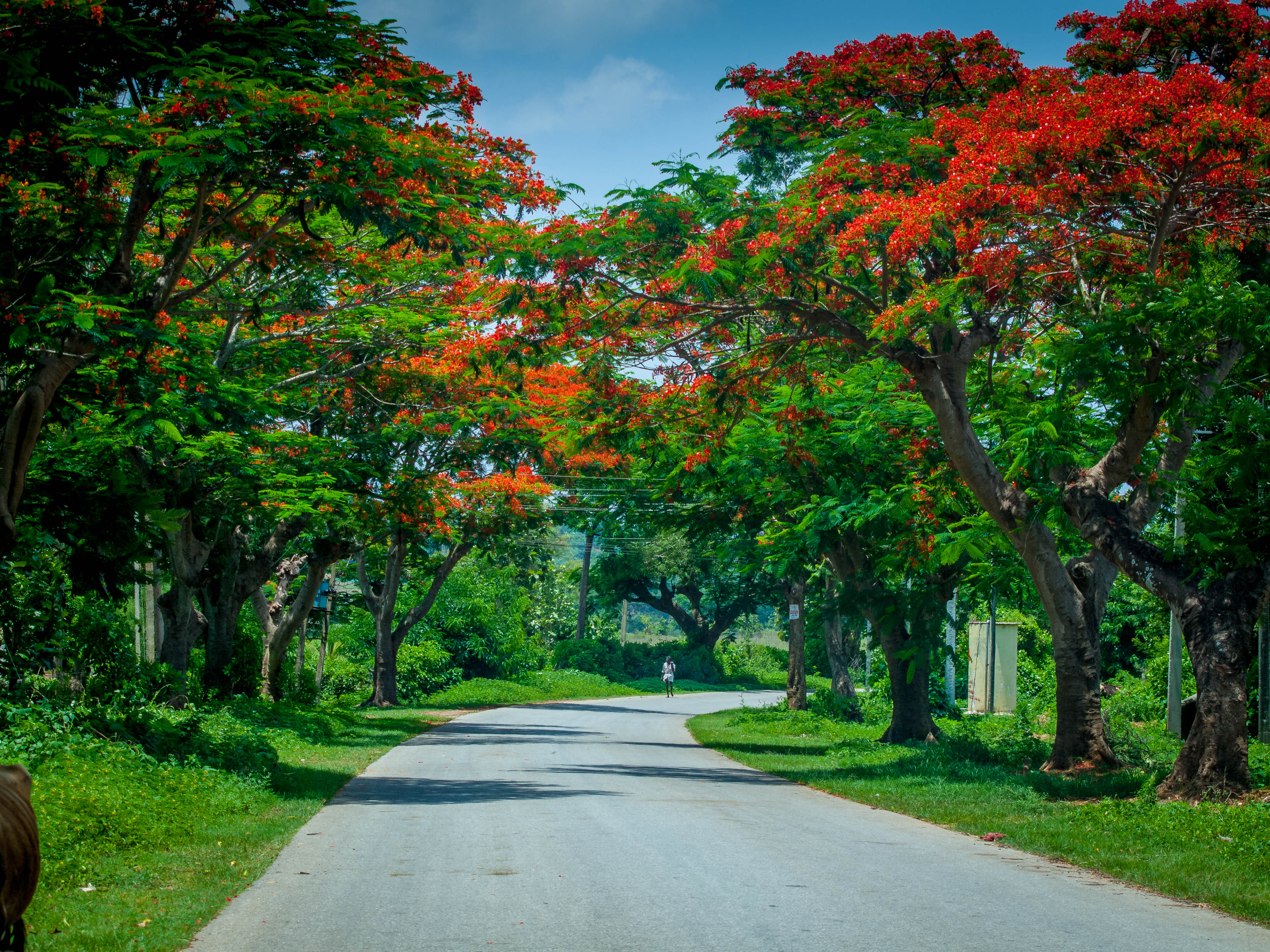
Antharasanthe village

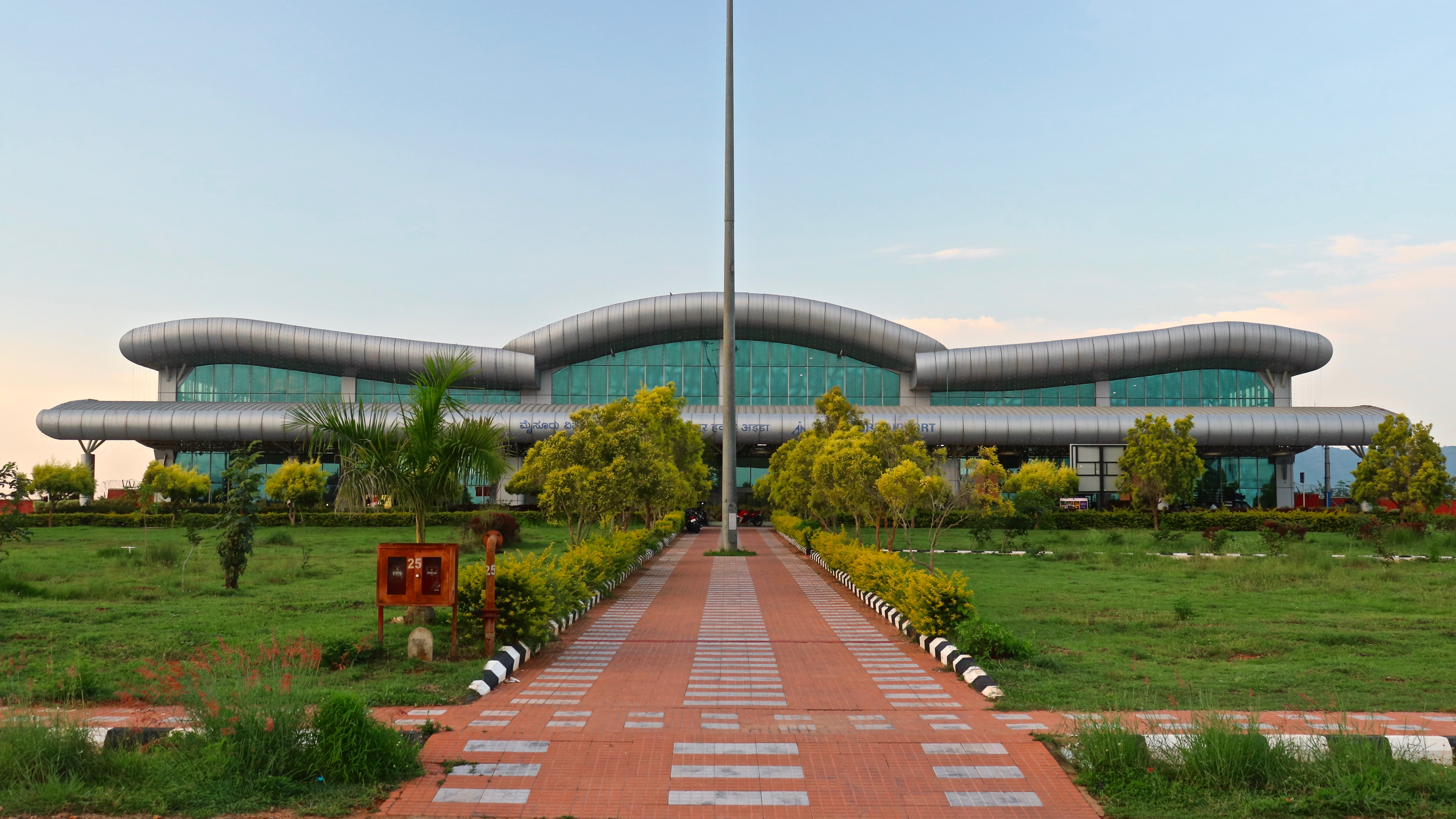
Mysore Airport

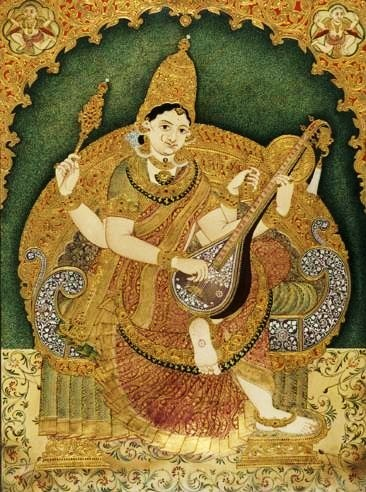
Mysore Painting

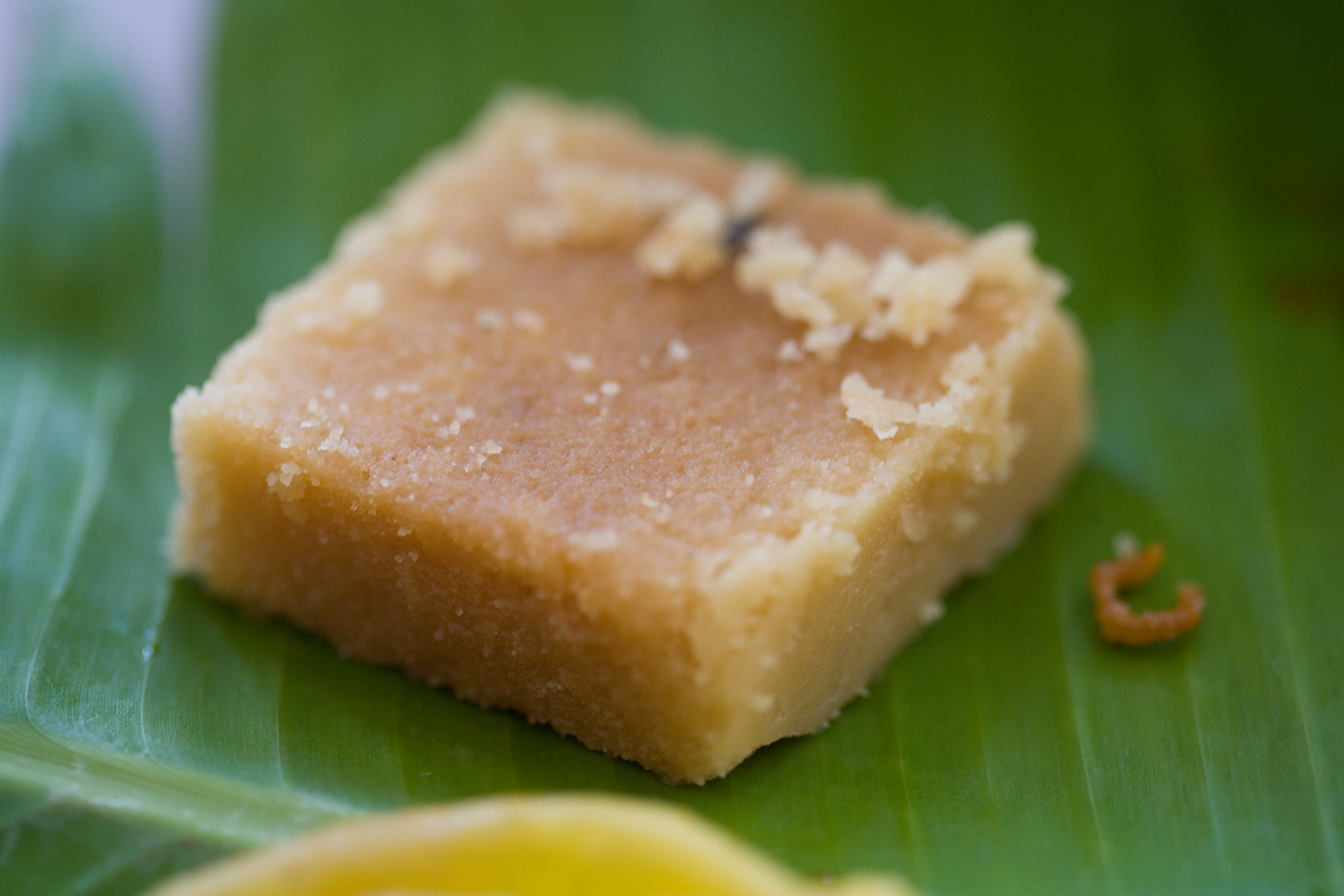
Mysore pak

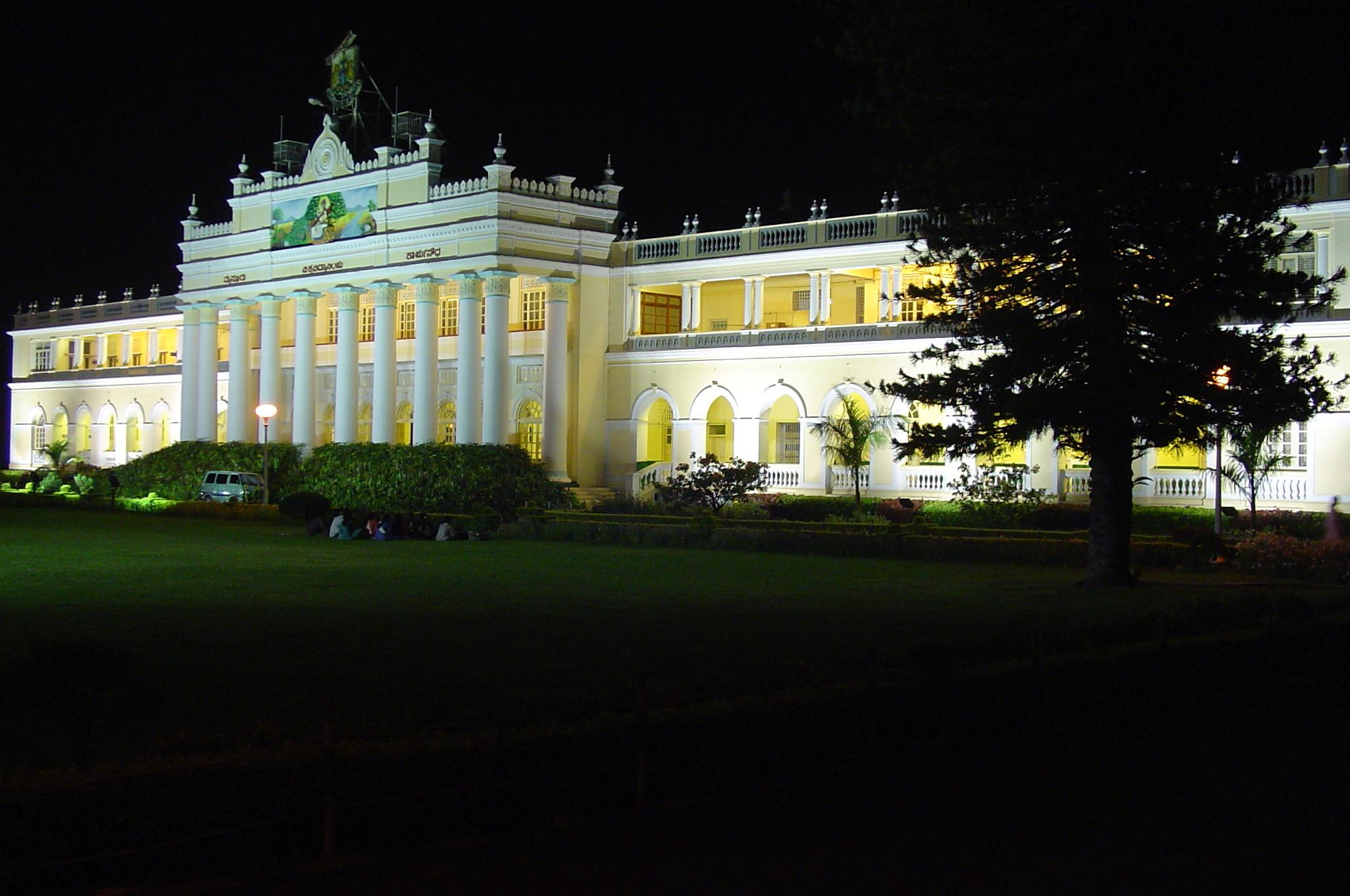
Mysore university building

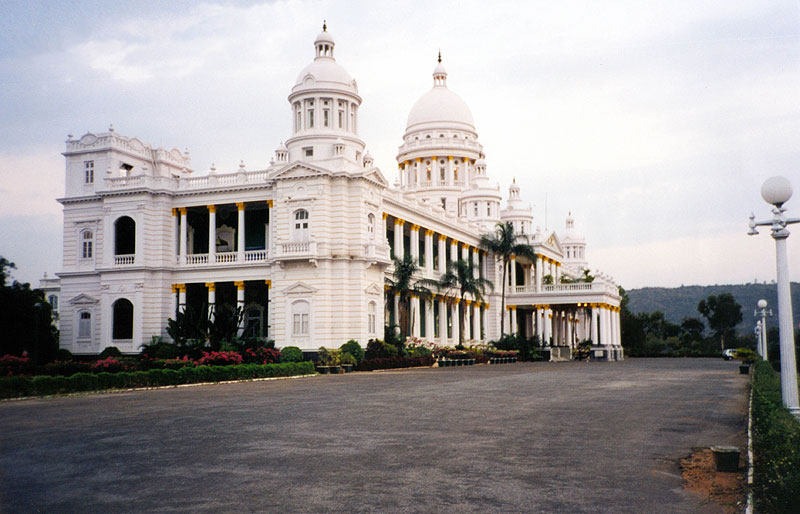
Lalitha Mahal Palace

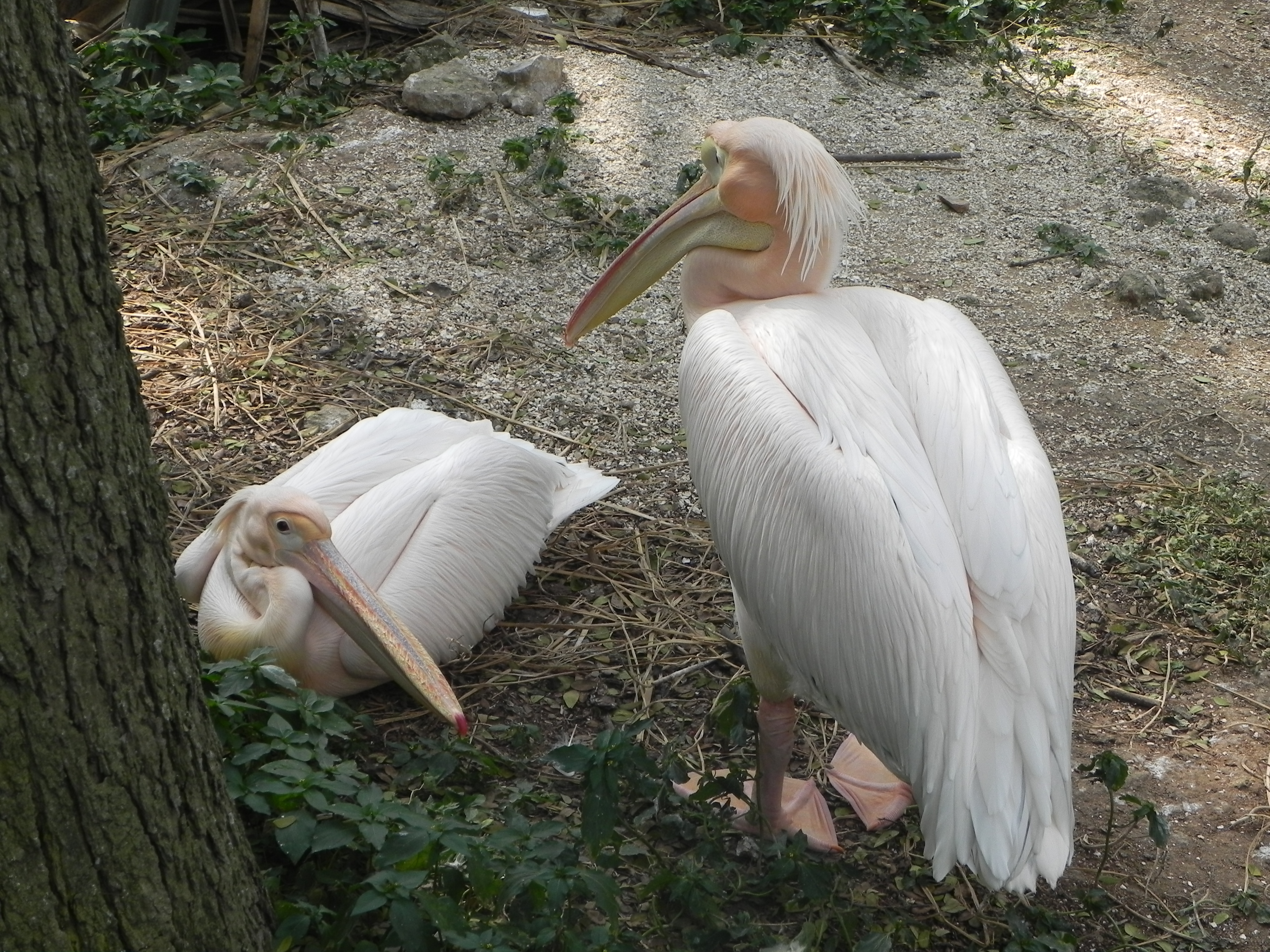
Birds at Chamarajendra Zoological Gardens

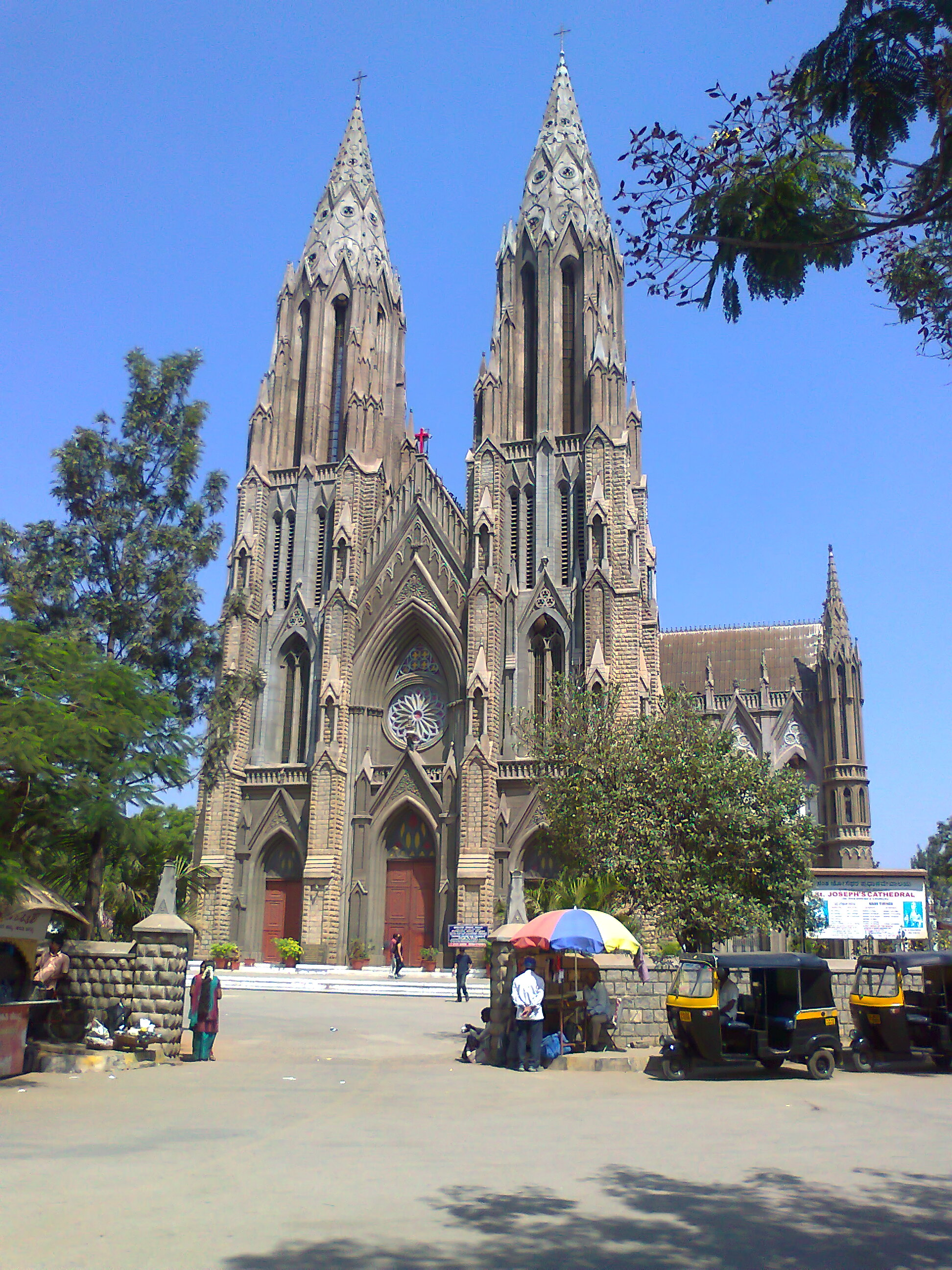
St. Philomena's Church

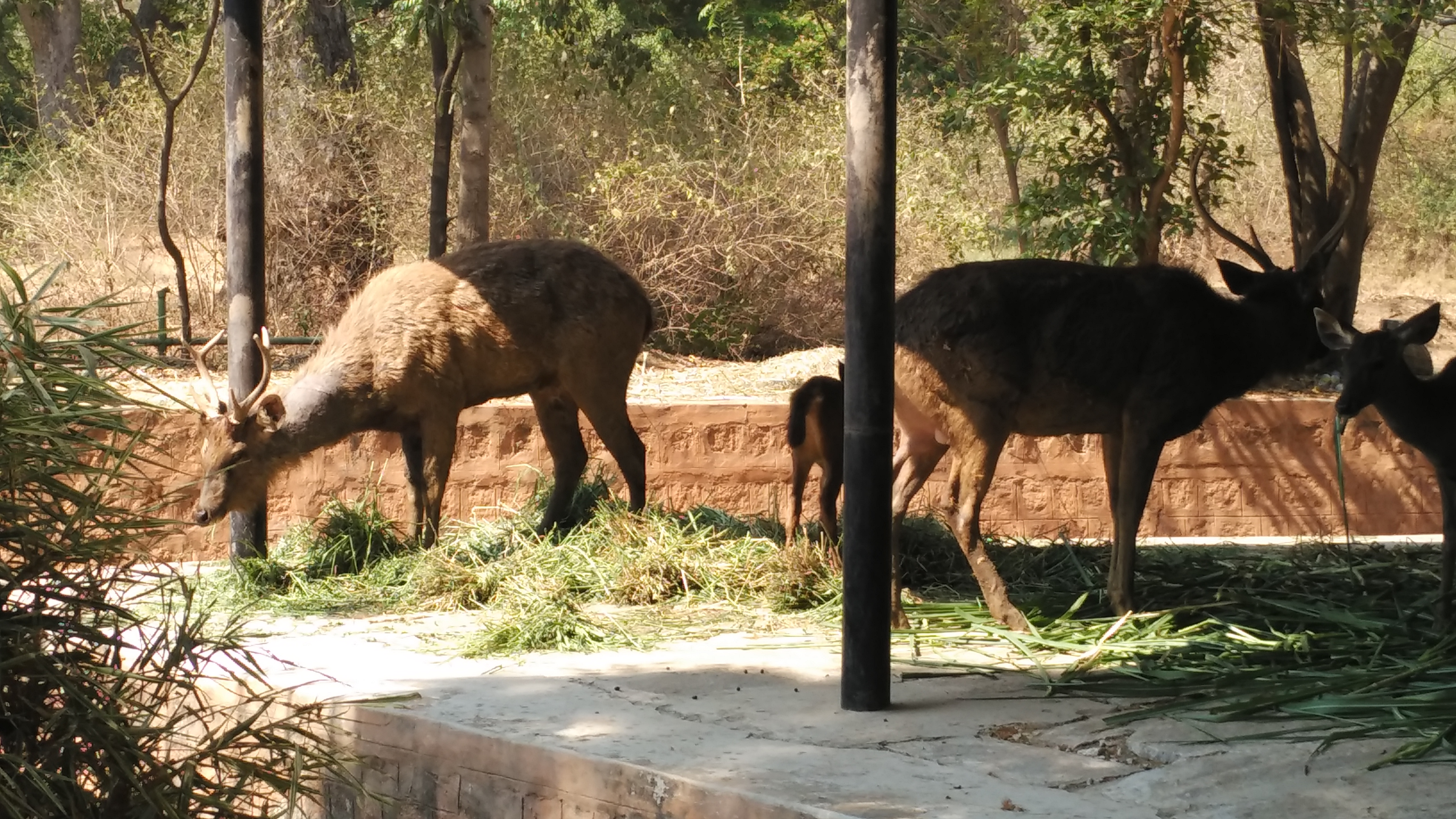
Stag at Chamarajendra Zoological Gardens

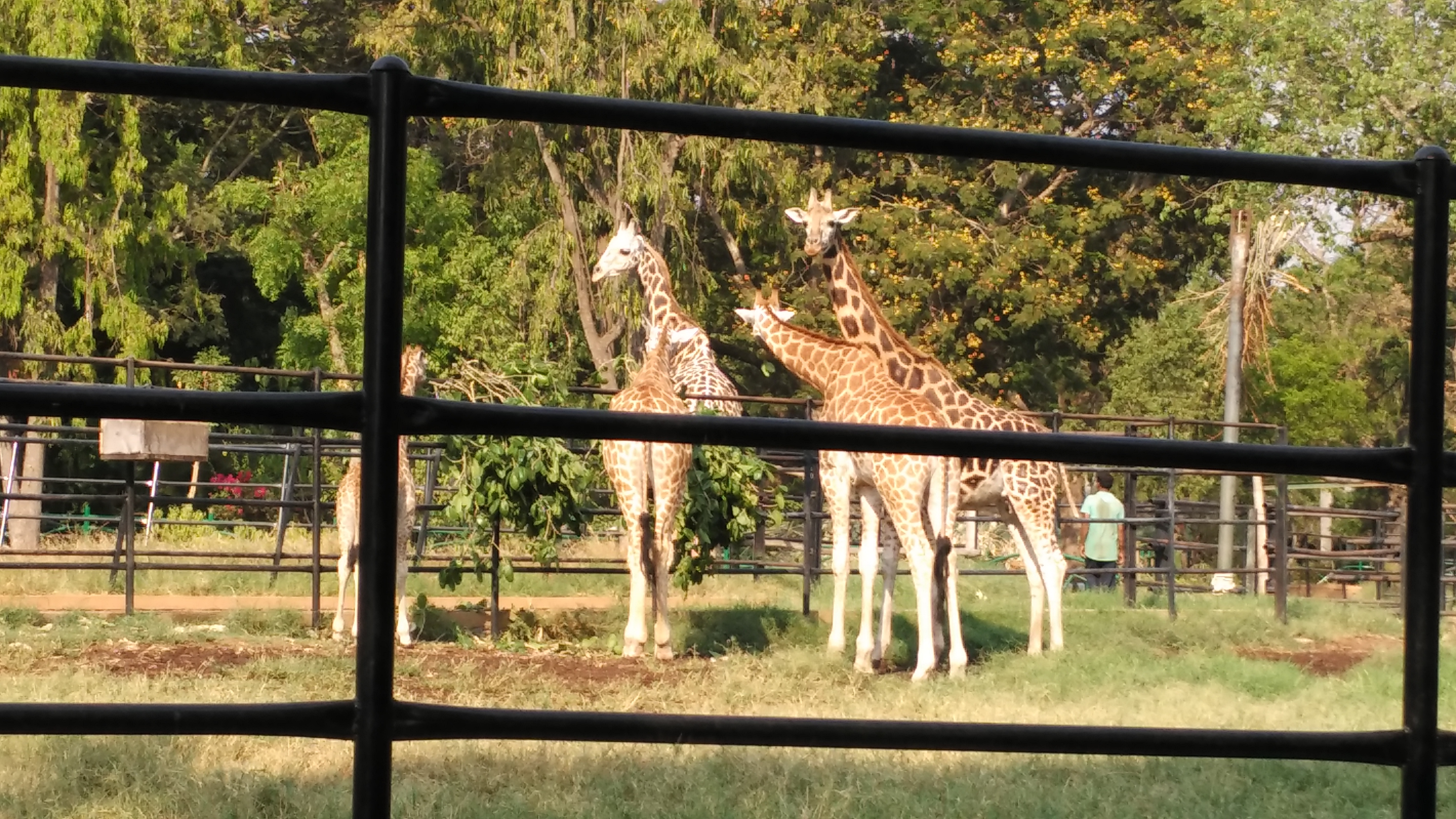
Giraffe at Chamarajendra Zoological Gardens

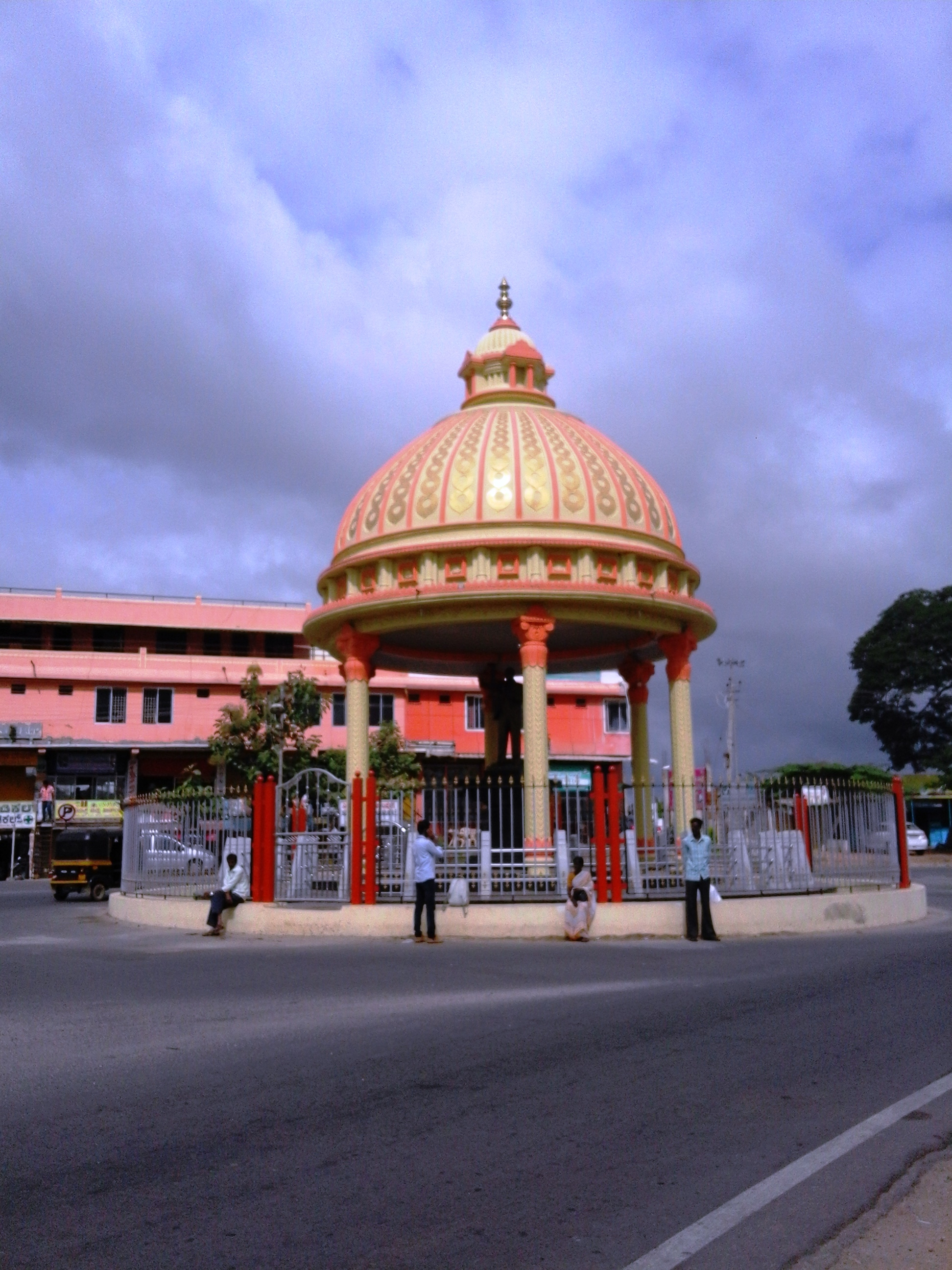
A Junction in Nanjangud

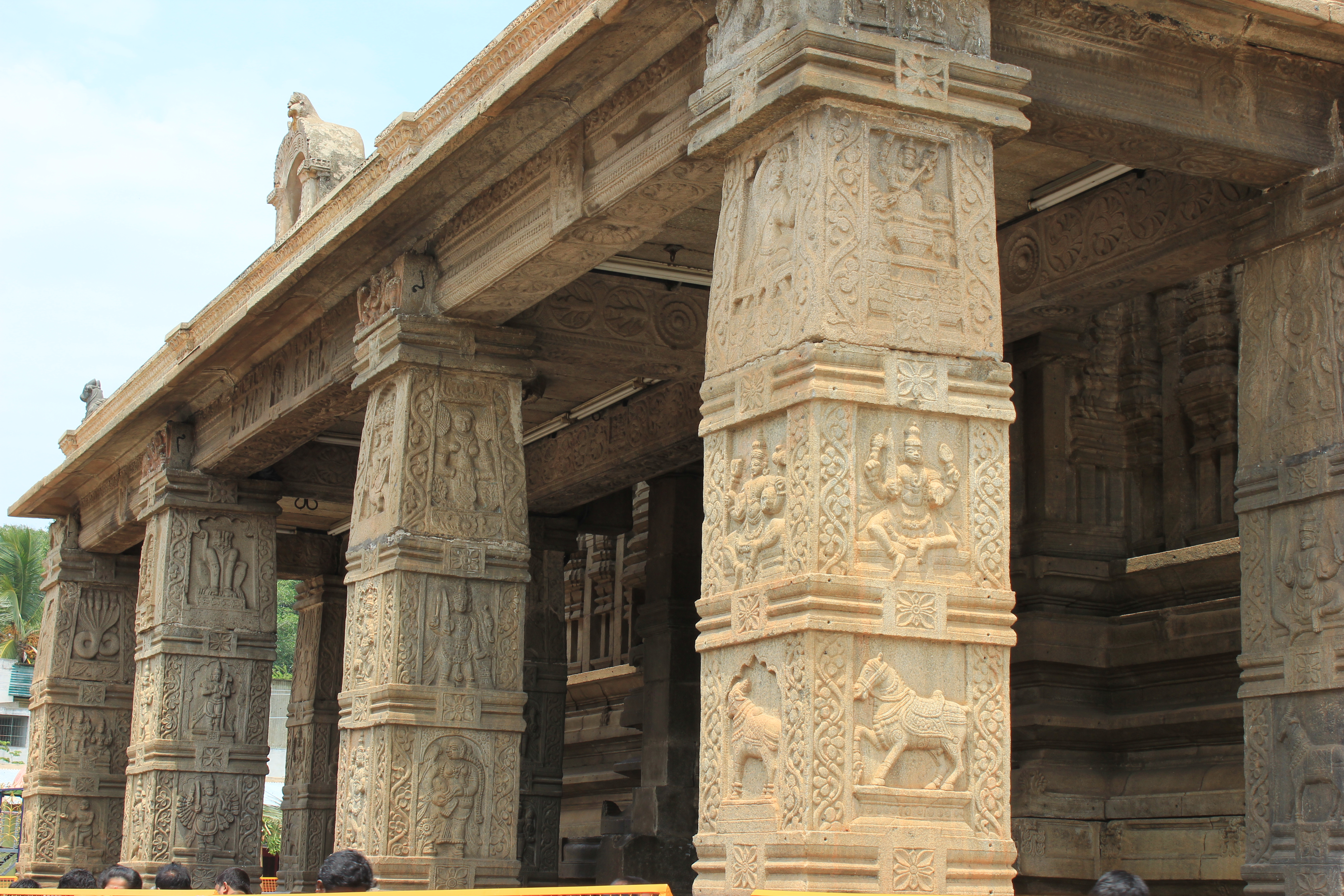
Srikanteshwara temple, Nanjangud

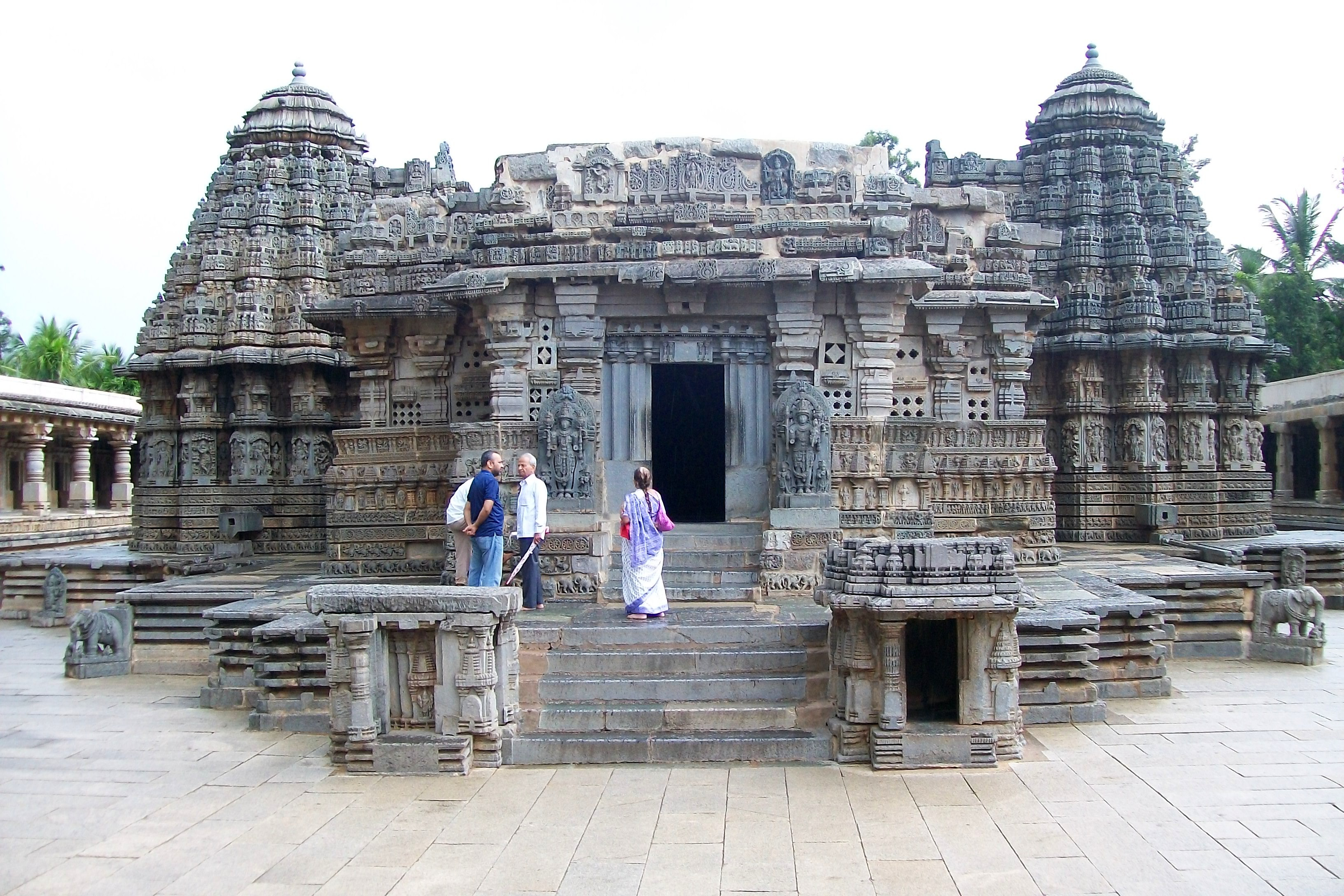
Channakeshava Temple, Somanathapur

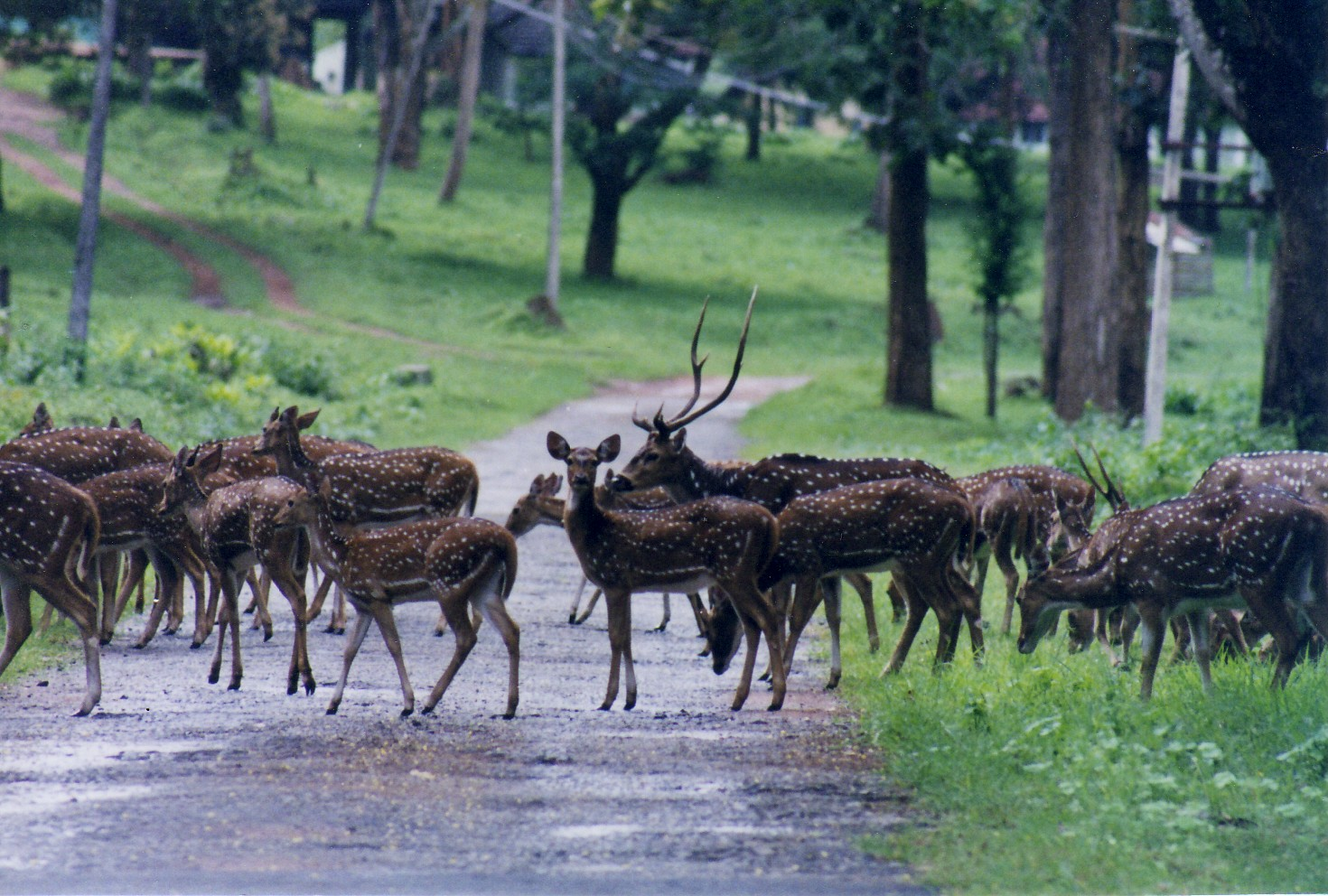
Herd of Deer, Nagarahole

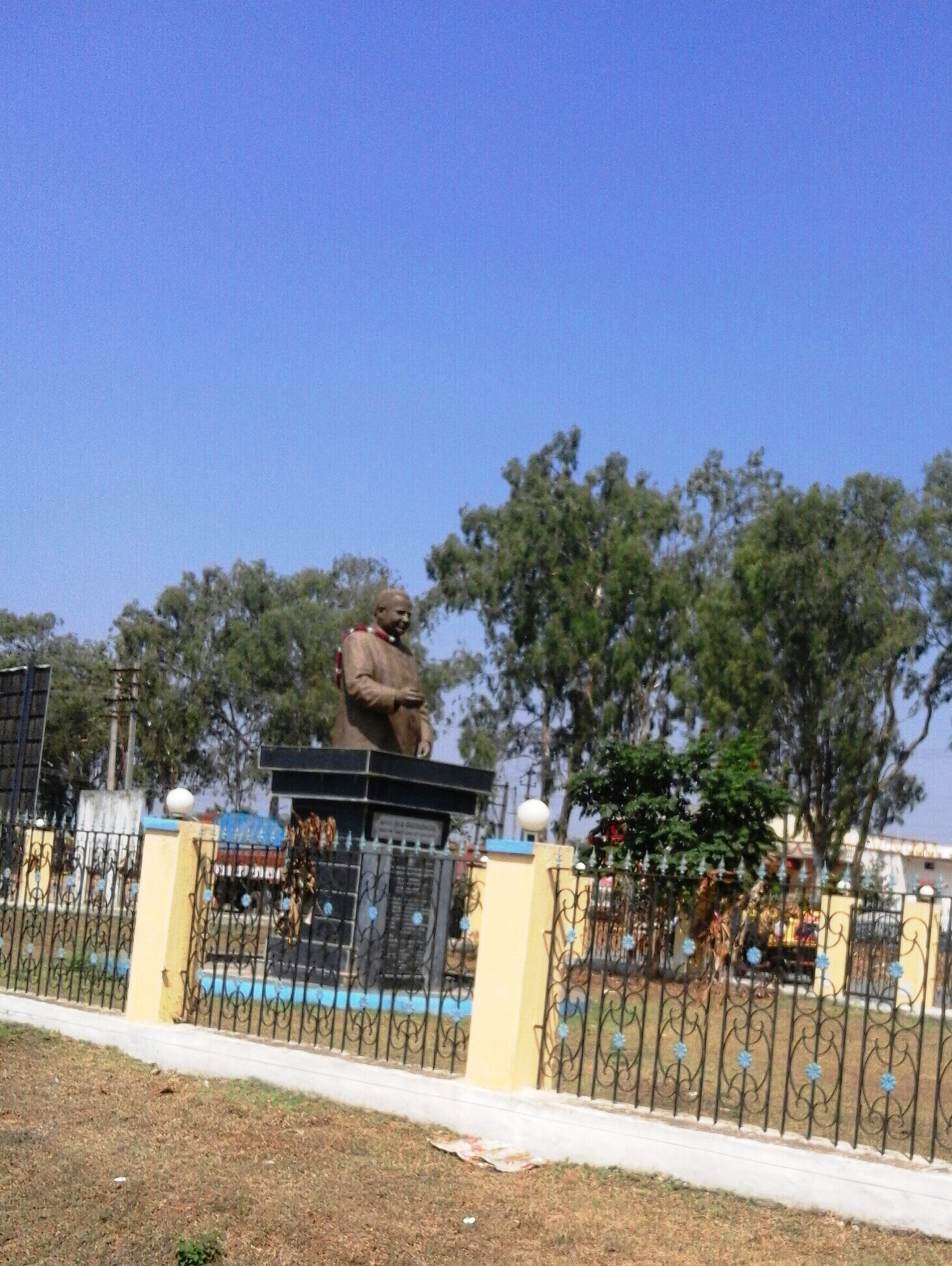
D. Devaraj Urs Statue at Hunsur Town Entrance

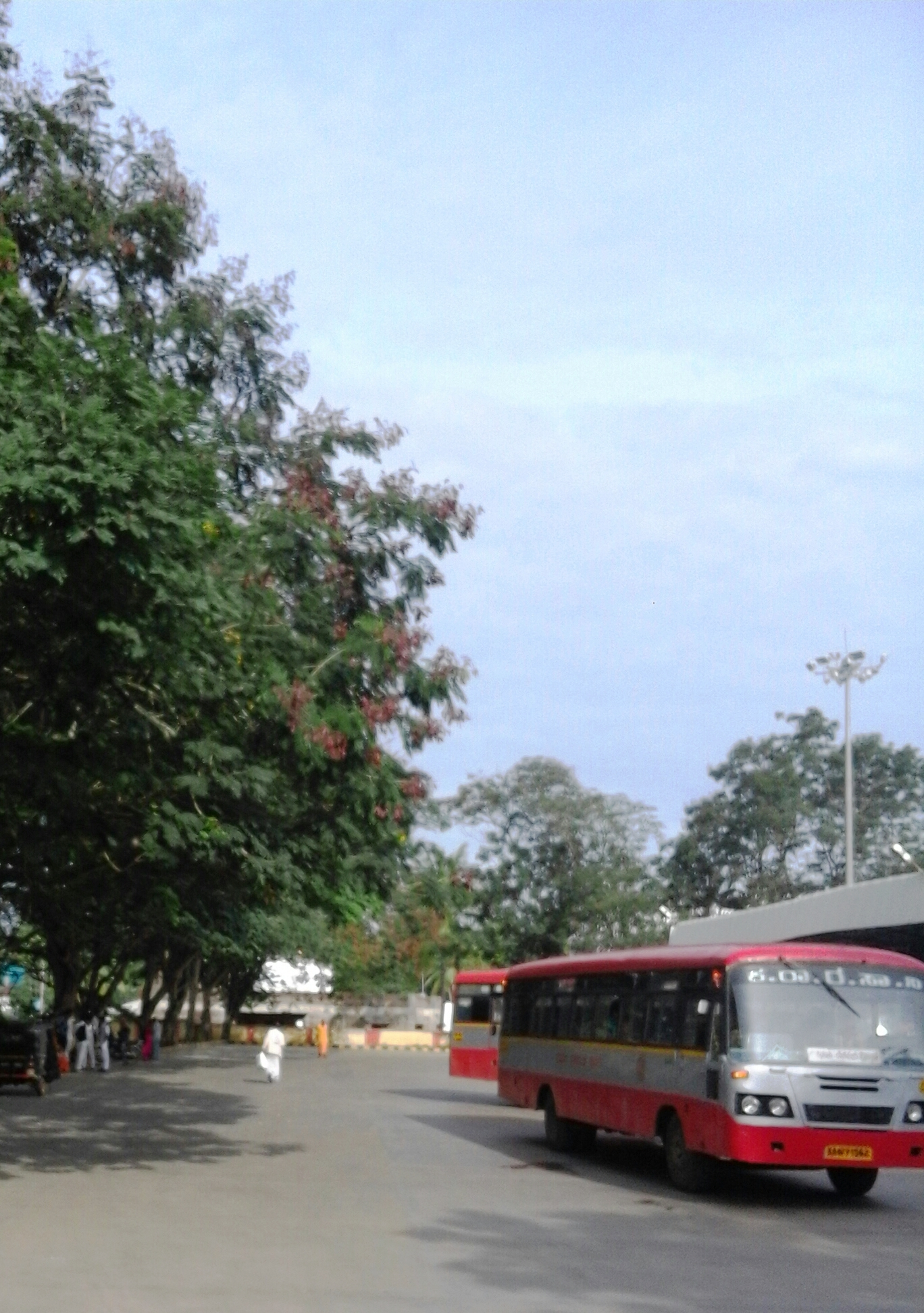
Piriyapatna Bus Stand

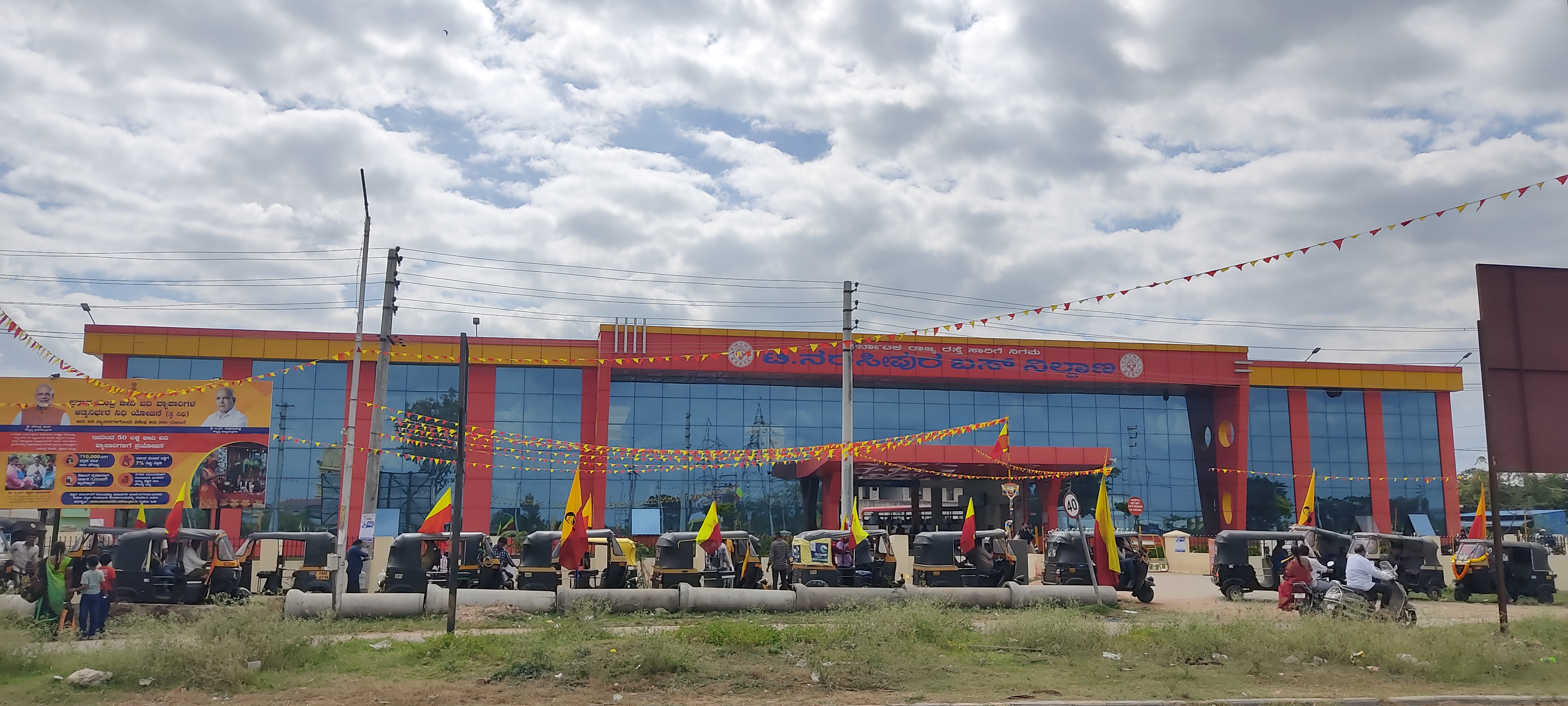
T. Narasipura Bus Stand

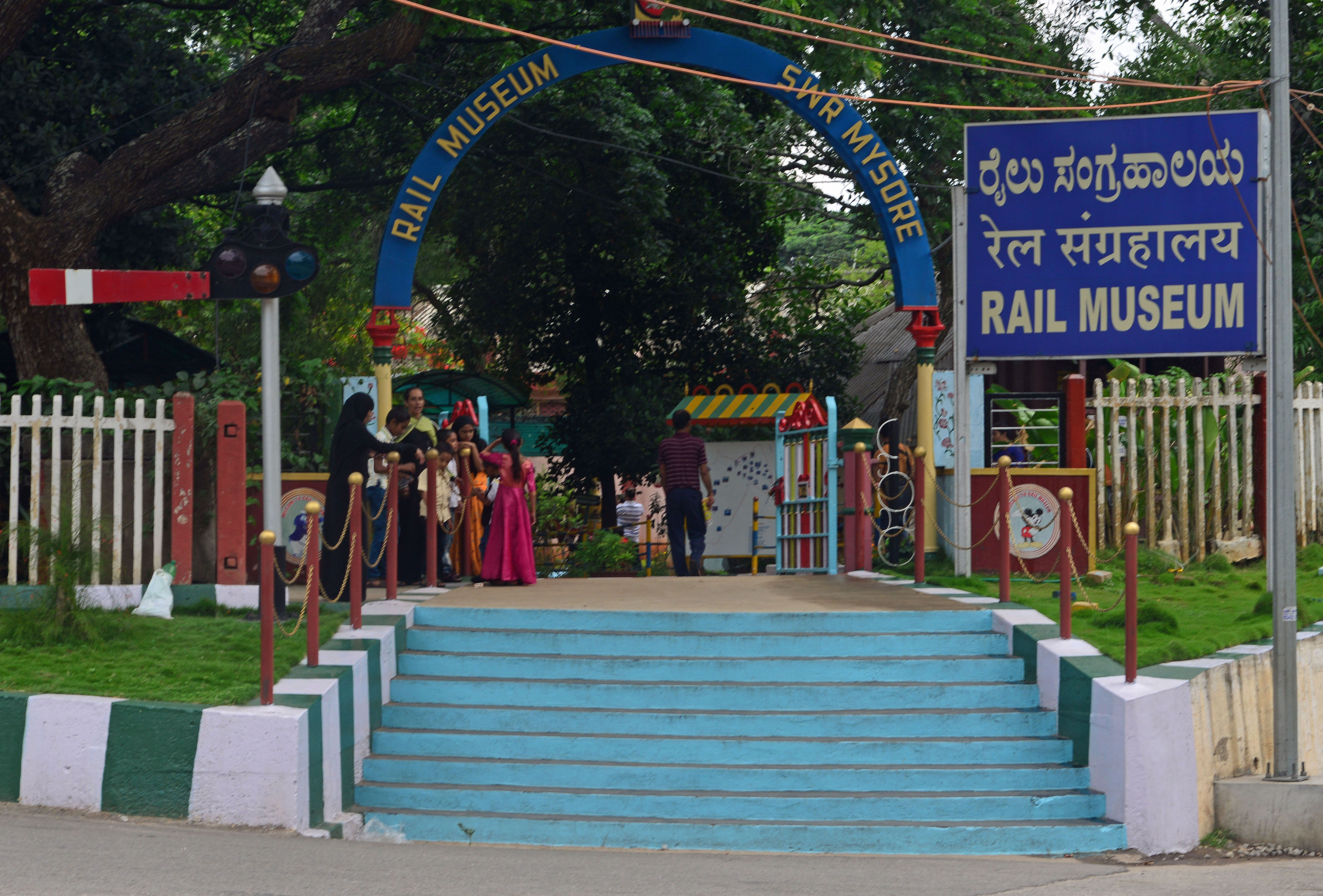
Mysore Rail Museum entrance

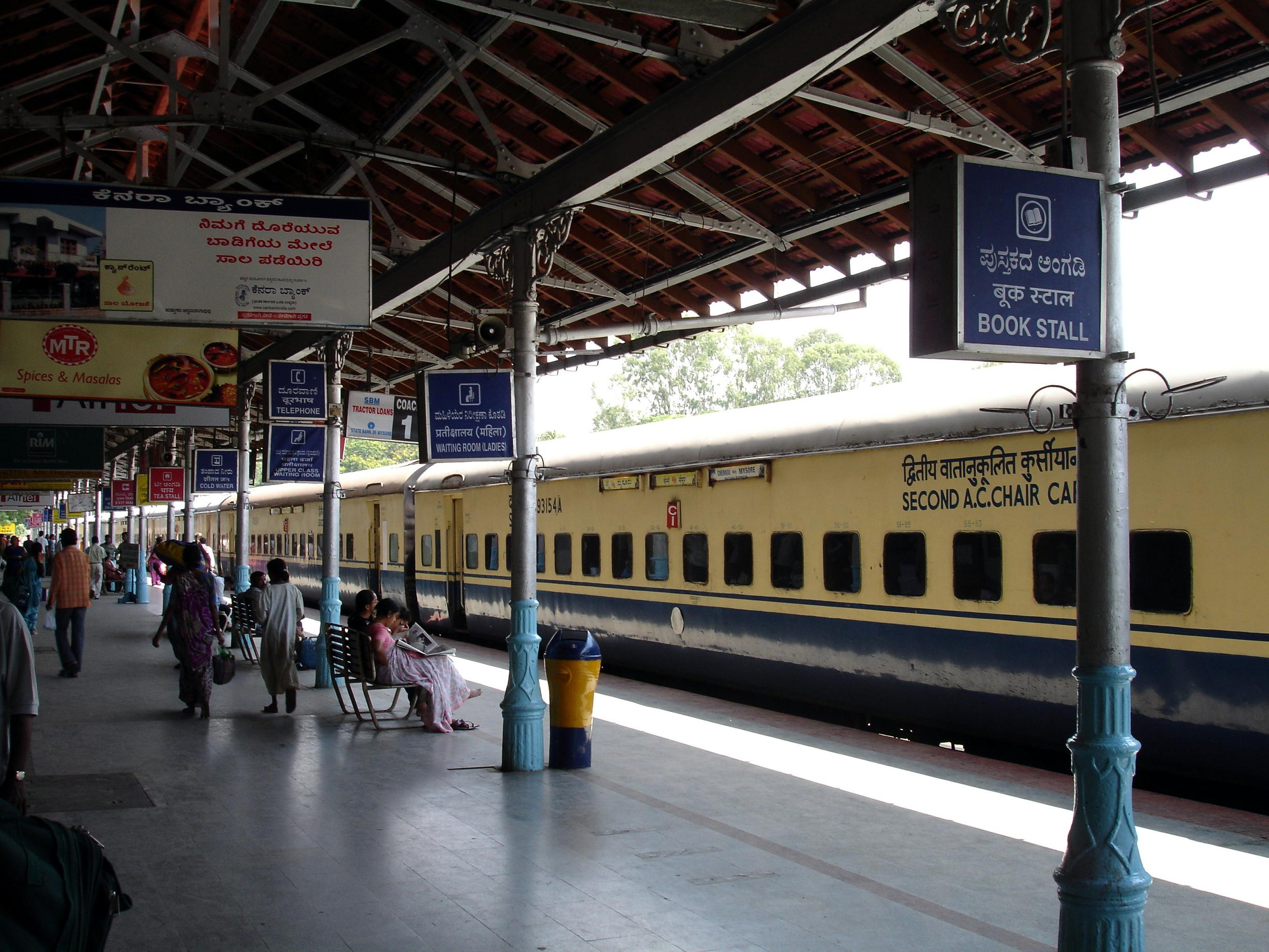
Old Rakes of Mysore Chennai Shatabdi Express

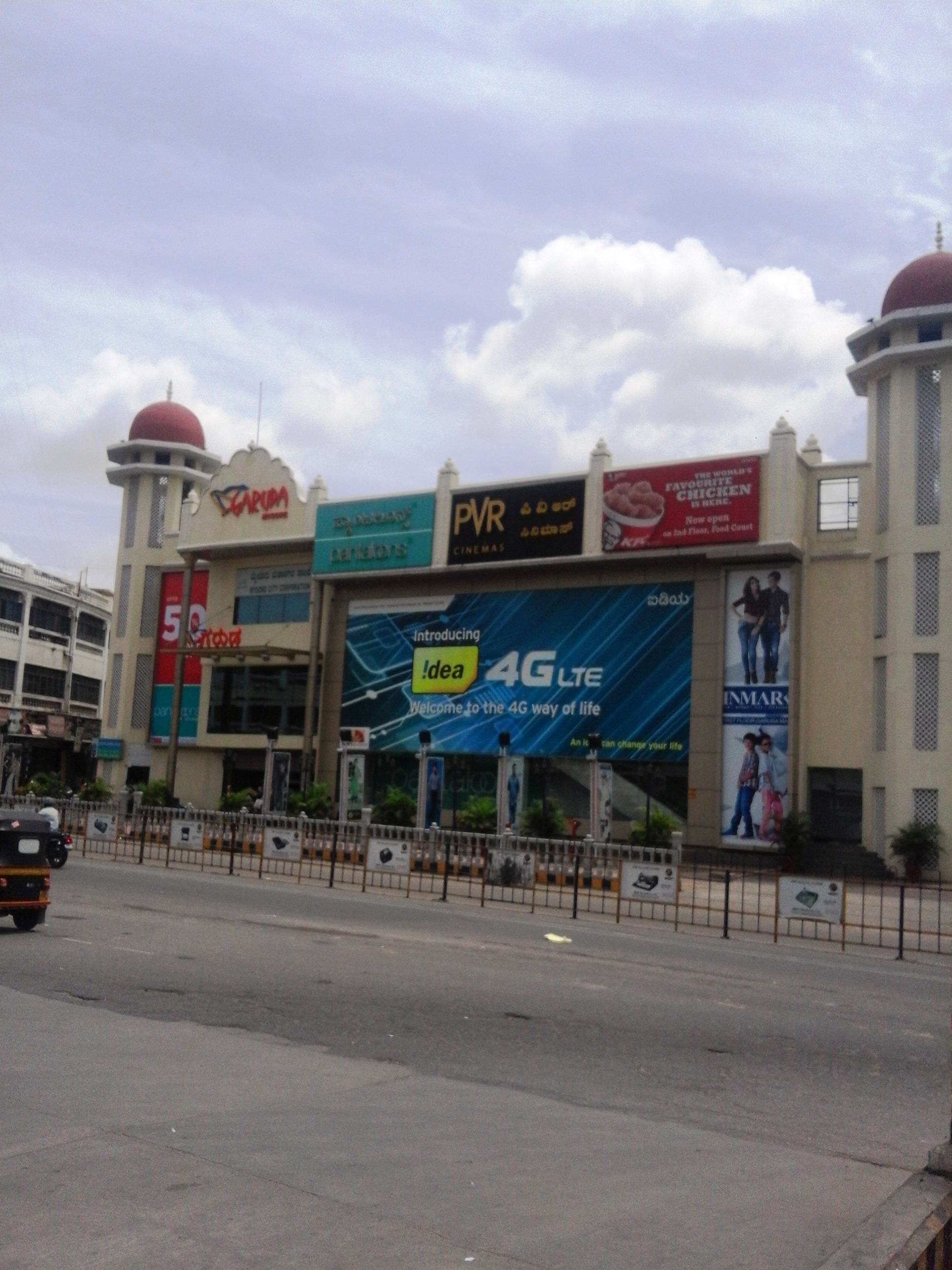
City Bus Station, Mysore

== Notable people ==
- Gurumalleshwara (1827–1899), Veerashaiva saint, Lingayat ascetic and teacher
- M. Jayashree, Kannada actress known for supporting roles

== See also ==
- Nanjangud
