= Bogadi Road =

Cluster of villages in India

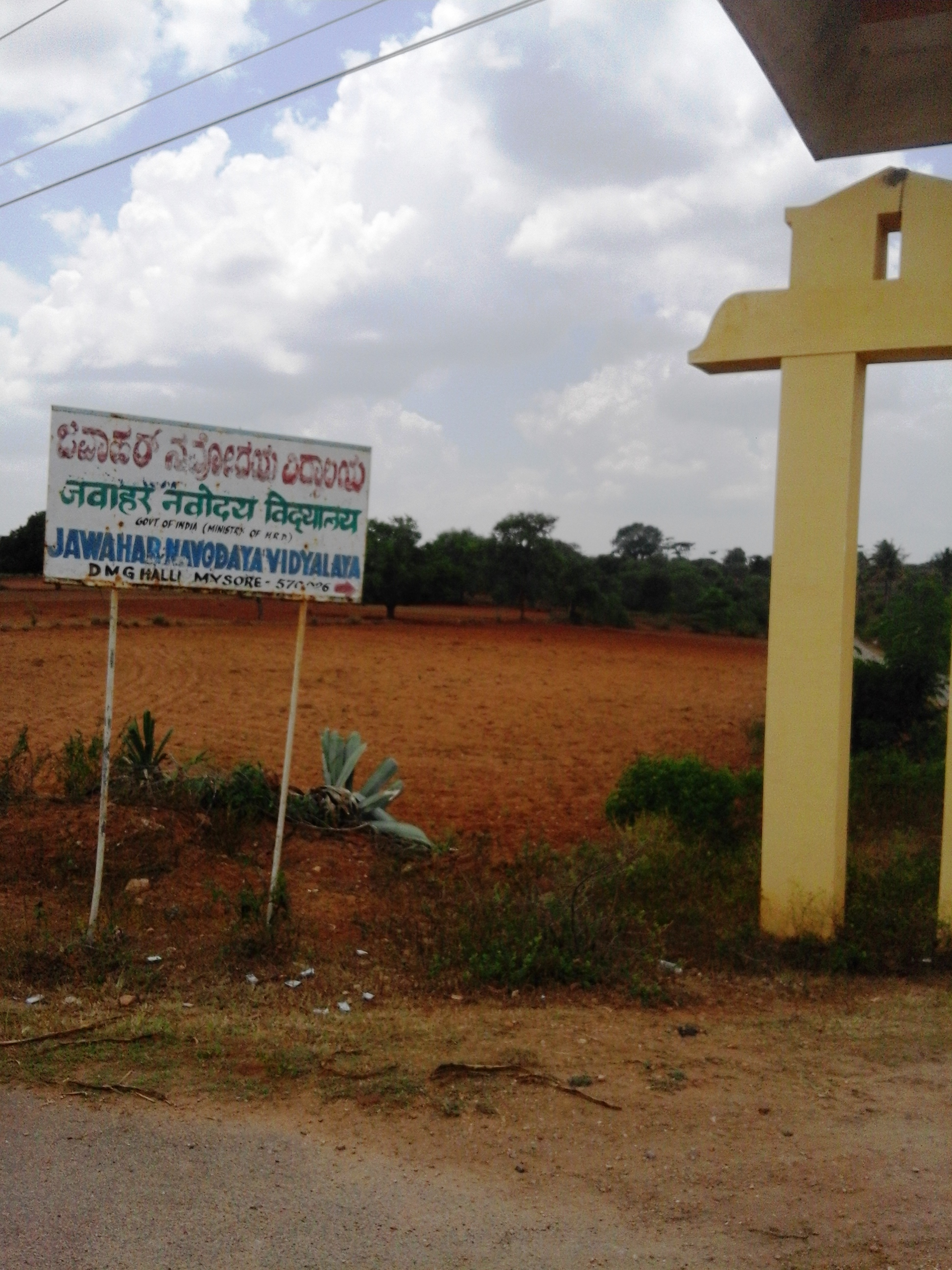
Navodaya School, Bogadi Road

Bogadi Road is a cluster of villages in Mysuru Metropolitan area, ಮೈಸೂರು ಜಿಲ್ಲೆ, ಕರ್ನಾಟಕ of India

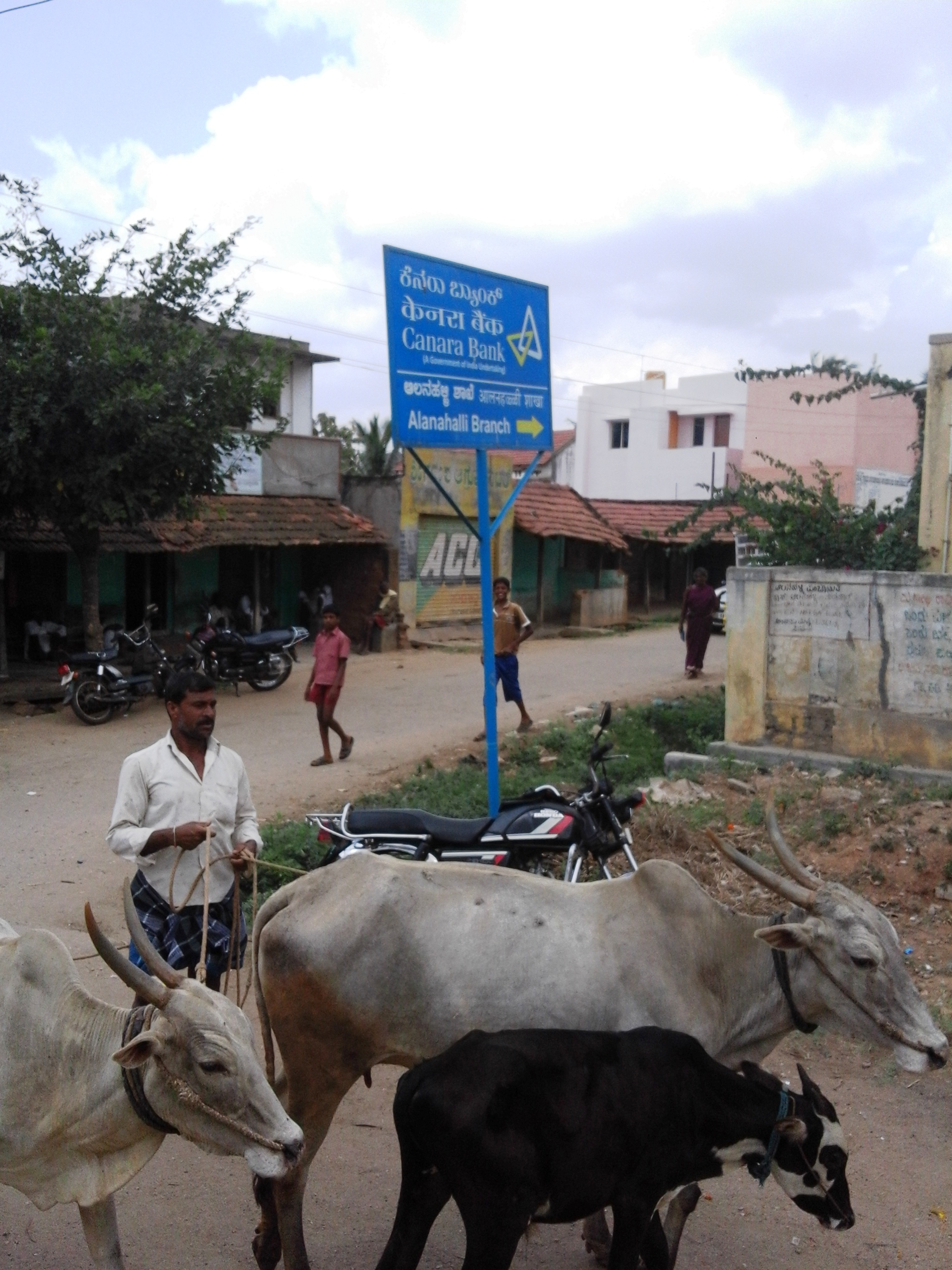
Alanahalli junction

== Location ==
Bogadi road begins at Bhogadi in western Mysore and ends at Hampapura on the Mananthavady road. The total distance of this road is 31.4 km.

== Access ==
Bogadi road begins from Mysore city and passes through the SBI Bank Bogadi, Ring Road junction, Bhogadi village, Dasanakoppallu, Trends Whispering Woods, Shankar farm, Suvarna nagara, Yesh Nagar and Krishna Farm. The first part of the road is dominated by commercial building, housing colonies and posh schools. Villages like Kaniyan Hundigate, Muthayyana Hundi, G. B. Circle, Gollana Beedu and Shintana Halli lead you to Alanahalli town. After Alnahalli junction, there are more villages like Gangadhosalli, Aswalu and Gejjeyana Hoddaragudi. The road proceeds further through Karibudhana Halli village and finally reaches at the temple town of Kendaganna Swamy Gaddige. Mananthavady road is another 10 km from here.

== Education ==
There are many prestigious public schools in this area like Christ Public School, Rainbow School, St. Francis School, Pundits Orchid School and Jawahar Navodaya School. SCMS Higher Primary school is one of the government schools in this area.

== Villages and suburbs ==
Bogadi, Ganagara hundi, Jattihundi, Beerihundi, Alanahalli, Kyathanahalli, Gollanabeedu, Aswalu and Kumarabeedu are the main villages in this area.

== Image gallery ==
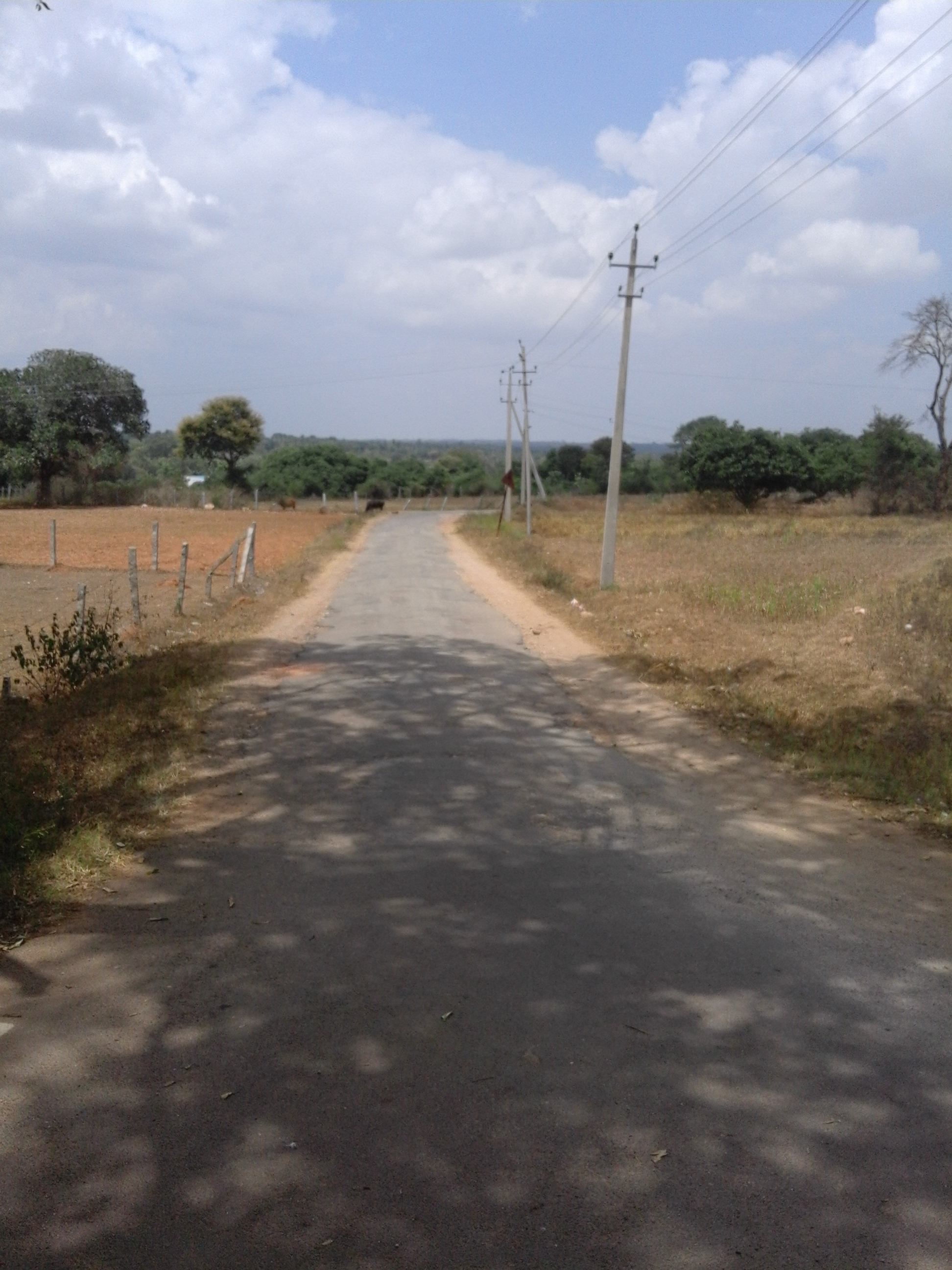
Settanayakana Village

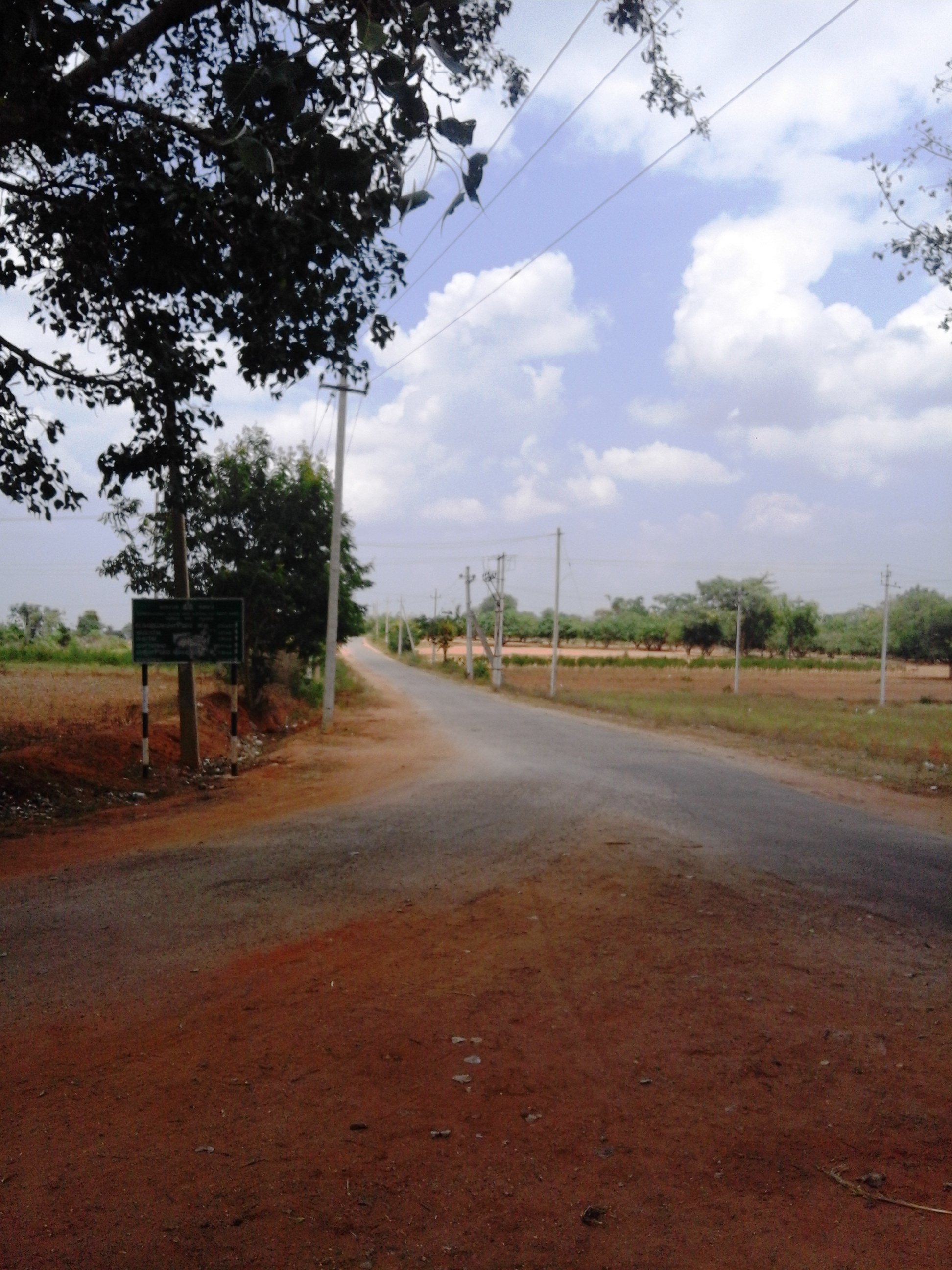
Mavanahalli village

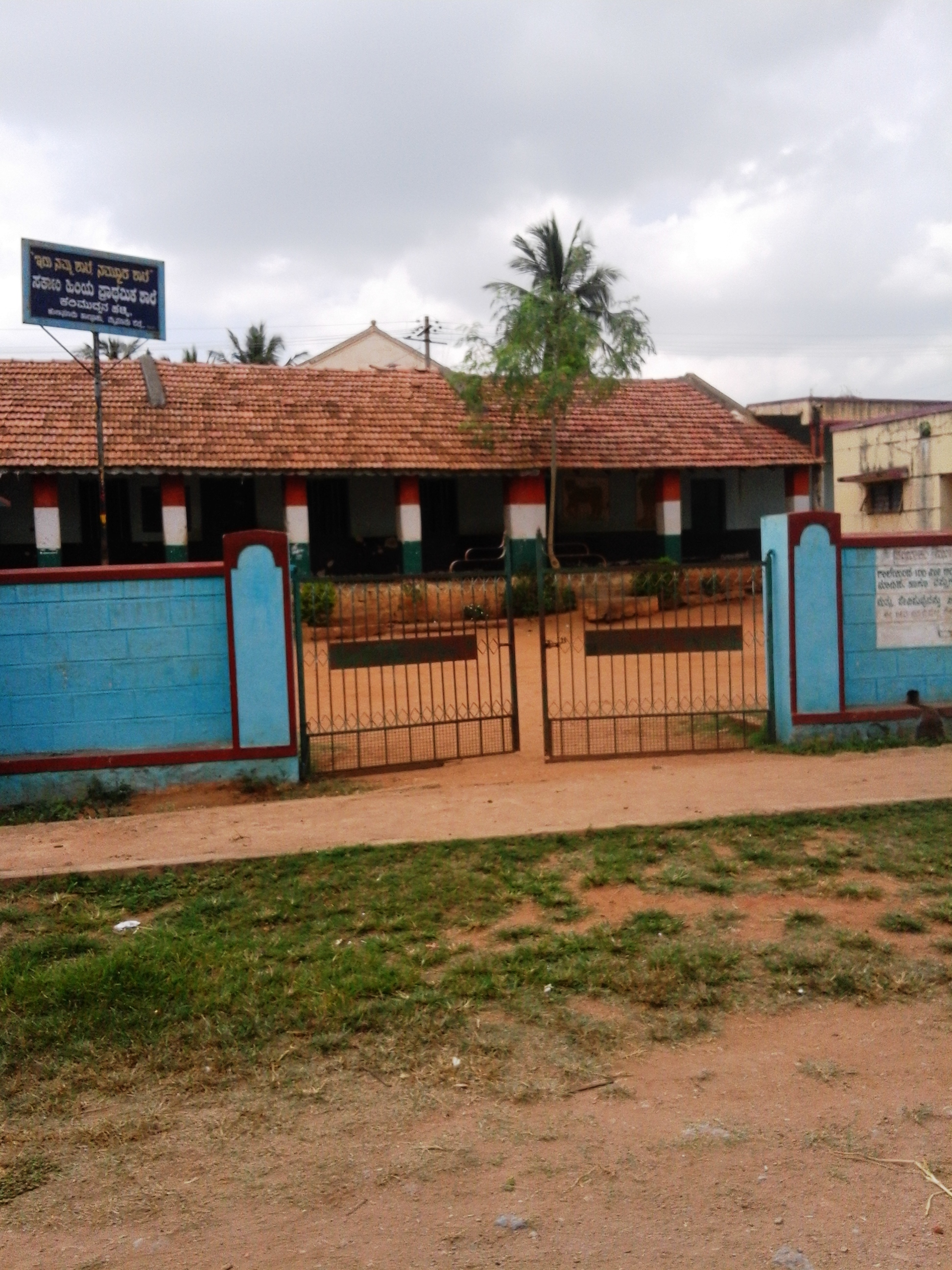
Karibudhana Village

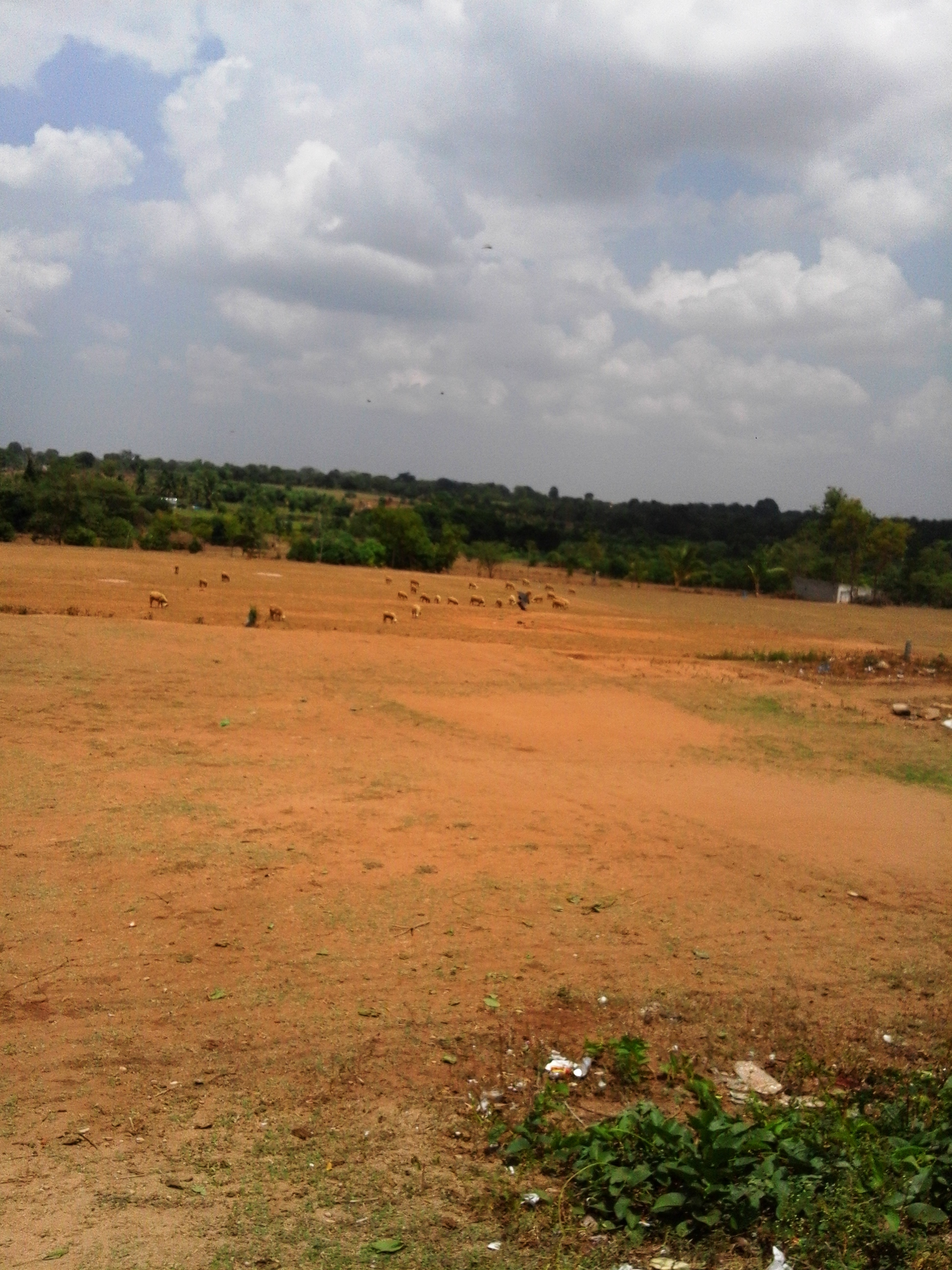
Gangadhosalli Village

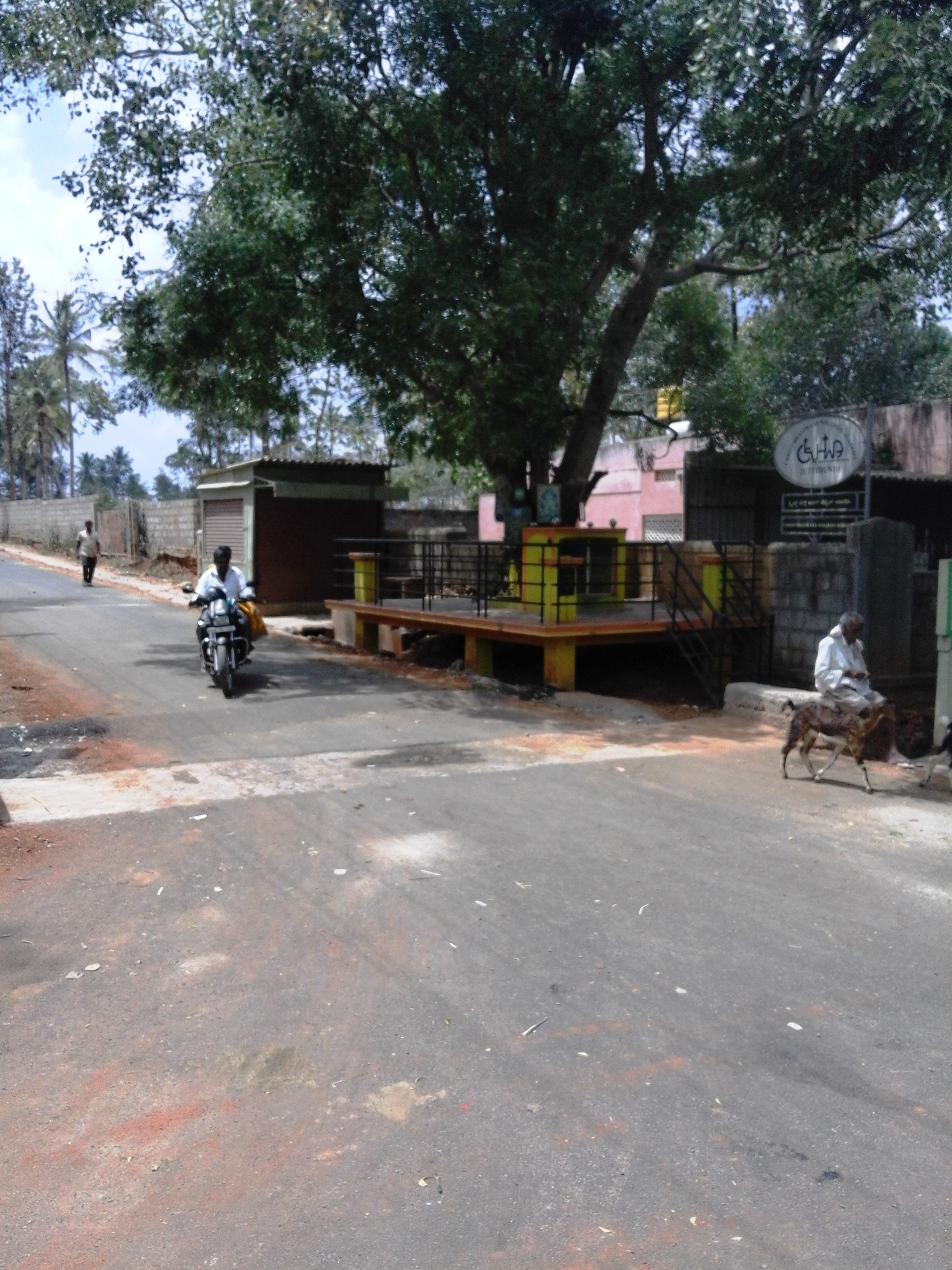
Jettyhundi village

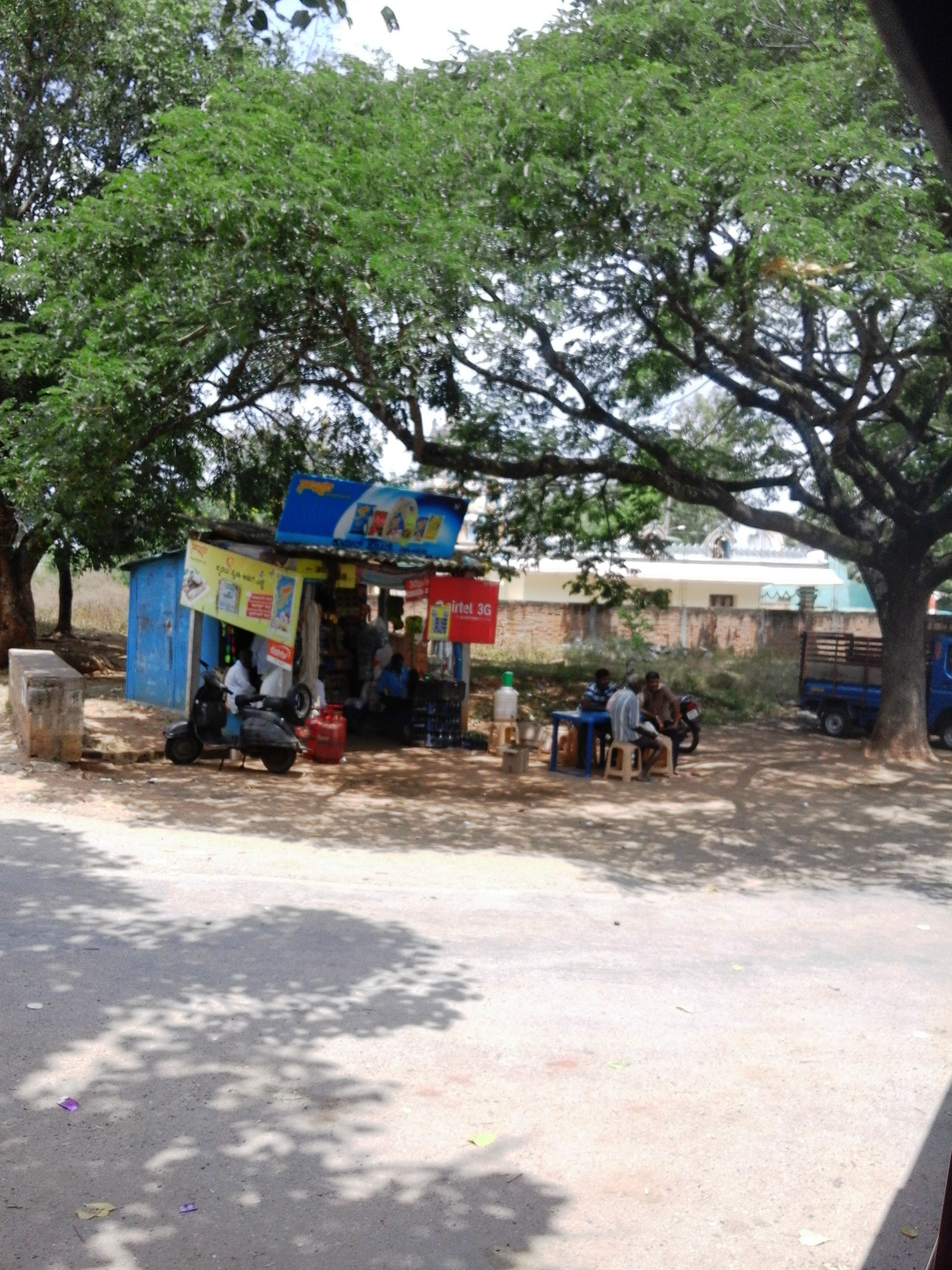
Gejjayana Hoddarugudi

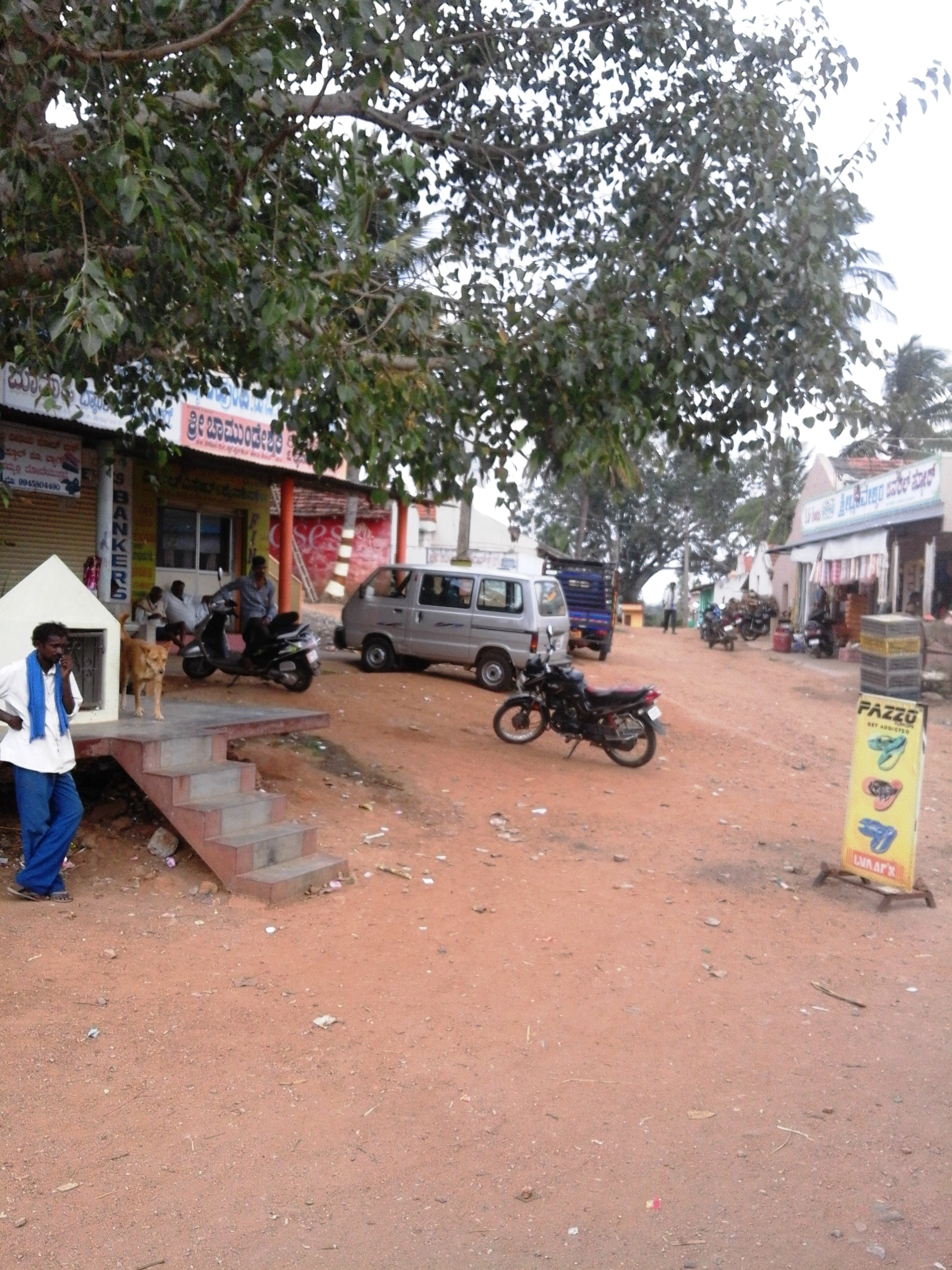
G.B.Saraguru village

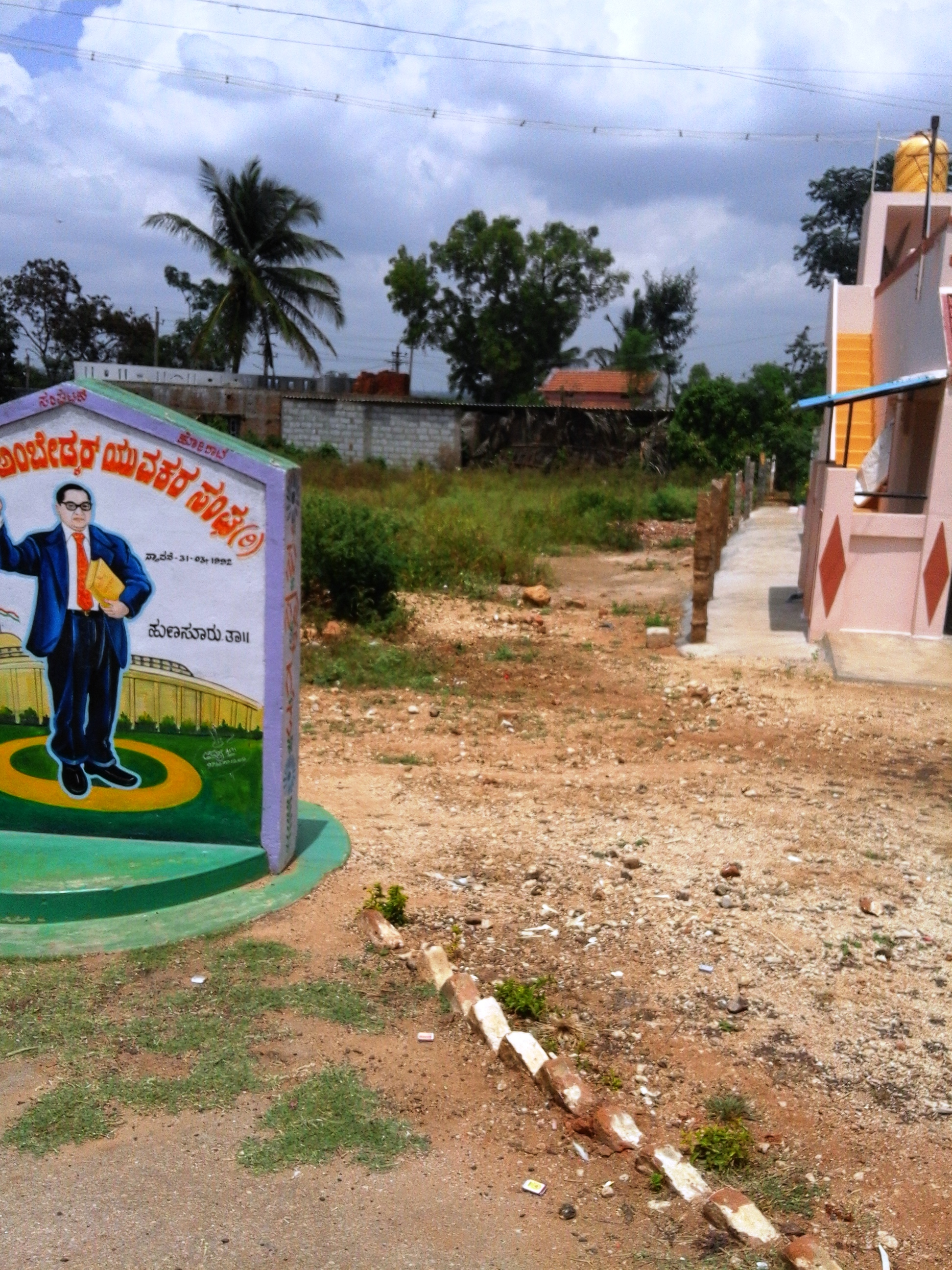
Aswalu village

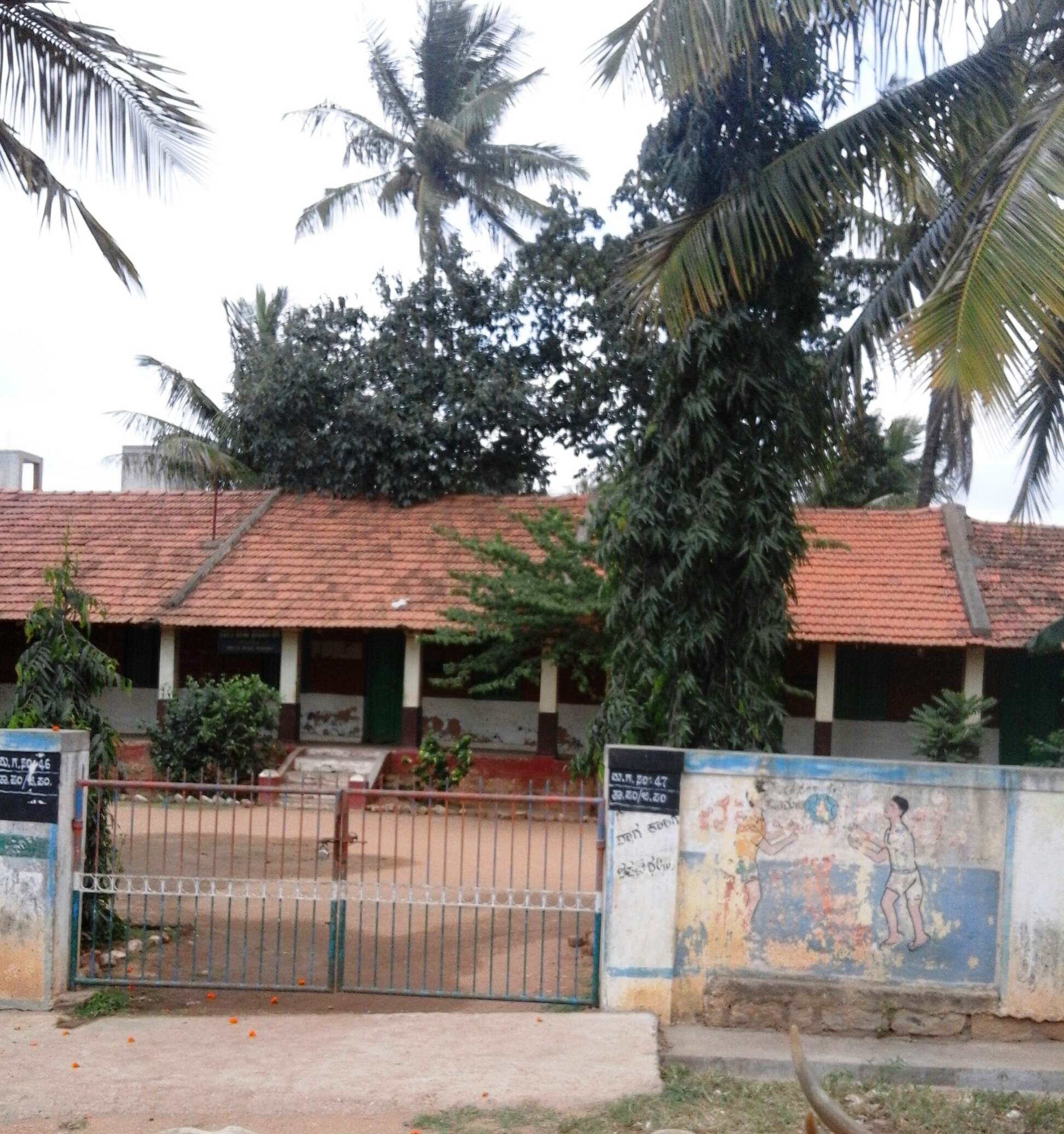
Alanahalli School

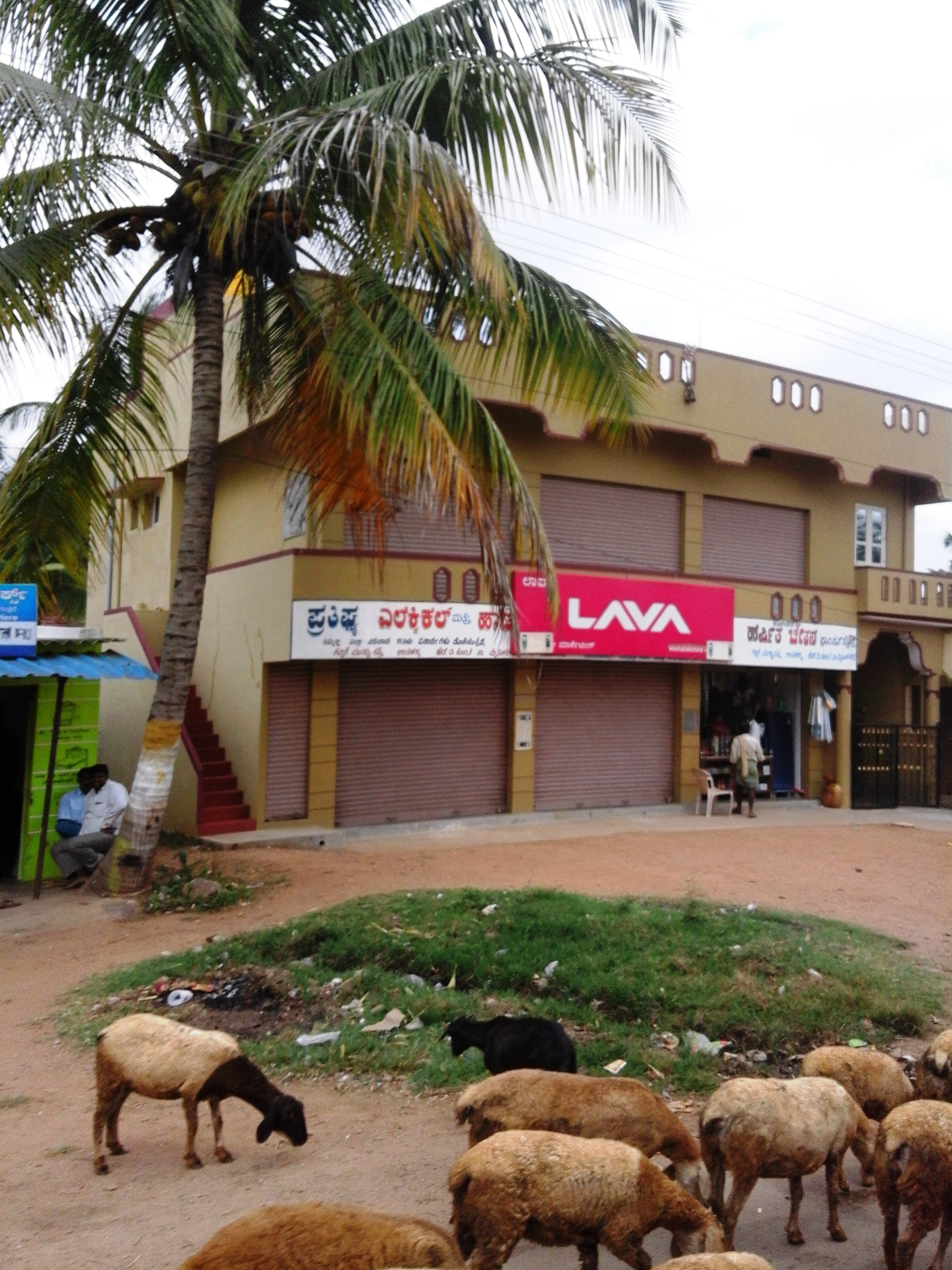
Alanahalli Town

== See also ==
- Gaddige Kenddganeshwara
- Hampapura, Mysore
