= Gaddige Kenddganeshwara =

Temple in Karnataka State, India

Coordinates: 12.190454°N 76.372849°E

Gaddige Kenddganeshwara Temple is a temple town in Hunsur taluk of Mysore district, Karnataka state, India.

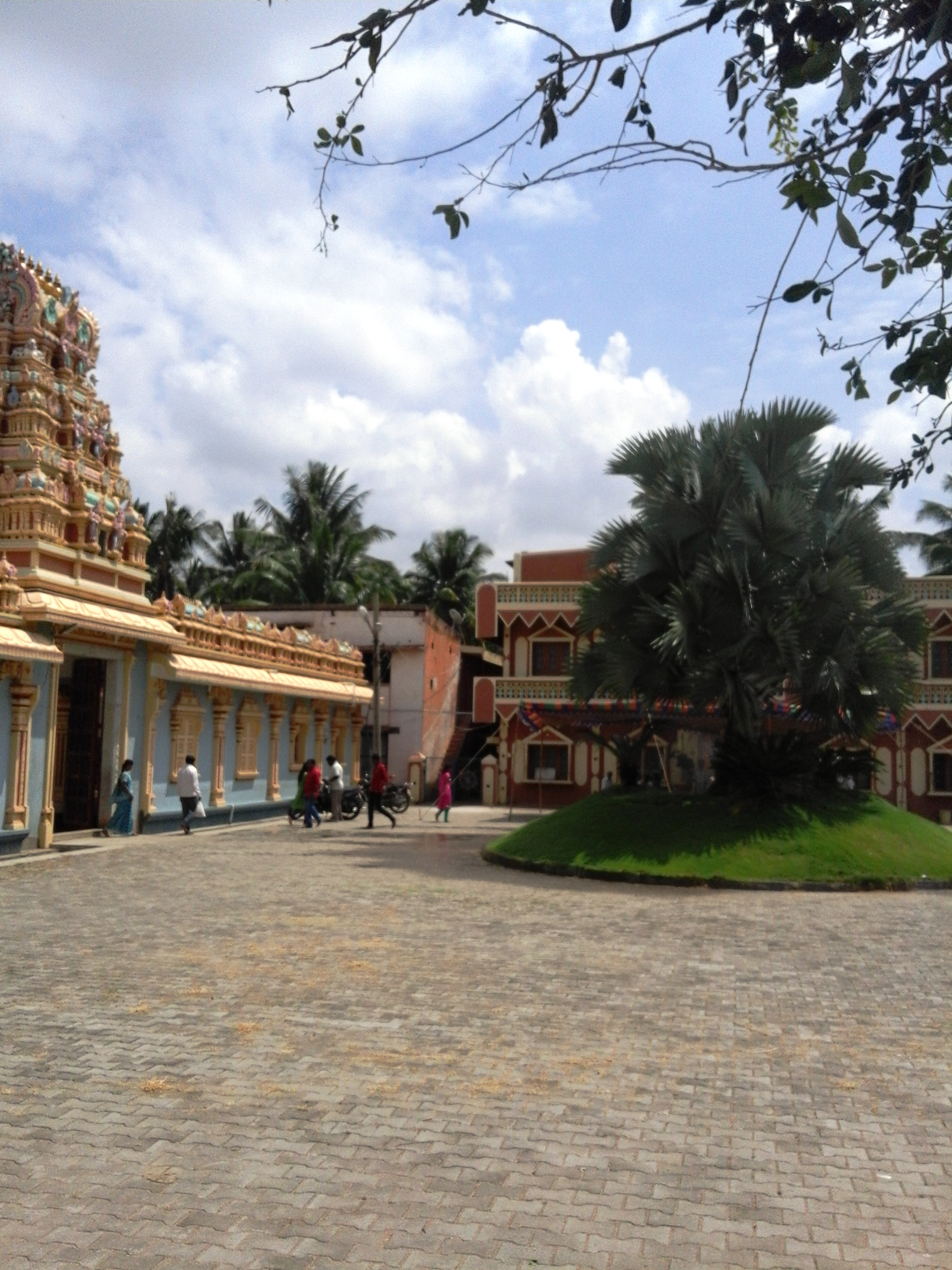
Gaddige Temple

Nearby villages are Karimuddanahalli, Gejjayyana Vaddaragudi, Aswal, Kutwadi and Basavanahalli.

== Location ==
Gaddige Shree Kenddganeshwara Temple is located in Gaddige, via Bhogadi road, 37 kilometres (23 mi) from Mysore.

== The temple ==
Sri Gaddige Kendaganneshwara temple is located in Gaddige village, Karimuddanahalli Post of Hunsur Taluk. Situated next to a small rivulet, Lakshmana Thirtha, and tucked away from the buzz of the city It is a little known temple, famous for its serenity and power. Gaddige is nijaikya jaaga of Pavada purusha aaradhya daiva Sri guru Kendaganneshwara Swami. The temple complex also has Sri Mahadeshwara and Sri Veerabhadreshwaraswamy as presiding deities.

Sri Guru Kendaganneshwaraswamy was from Shiggavi, Haveri District. He was a devotee of Shiva. He is said to have lived during the reign of Mysore Wodeyars. He came to Gaddige village and took Sannyasa and built a temple to Lord Shiva. He is said to have lived for 80 years. Legend has it that he would meditate sitting on an Agni Kunda without any harm.

Sri Gaddige Kendaganneshwara temple was established by Sri Guru Kendaganneshwara Swamy in 17th Century. The temple complex was renovated in the years 2006 - 2011 by Mr Mahadevappa ( B S Mahadev ) of Shimoga, which is now further expanded. Gaddige Kenddganeshwara Temple attracts large number of devotees from different parts of Karnataka. The temple offers daily Anna Dasoha to the pilgrims.

== Friday market ==
The farmers sell vegetables and fruits on Fridays and occupy the bus station for one day.

== Image gallery ==
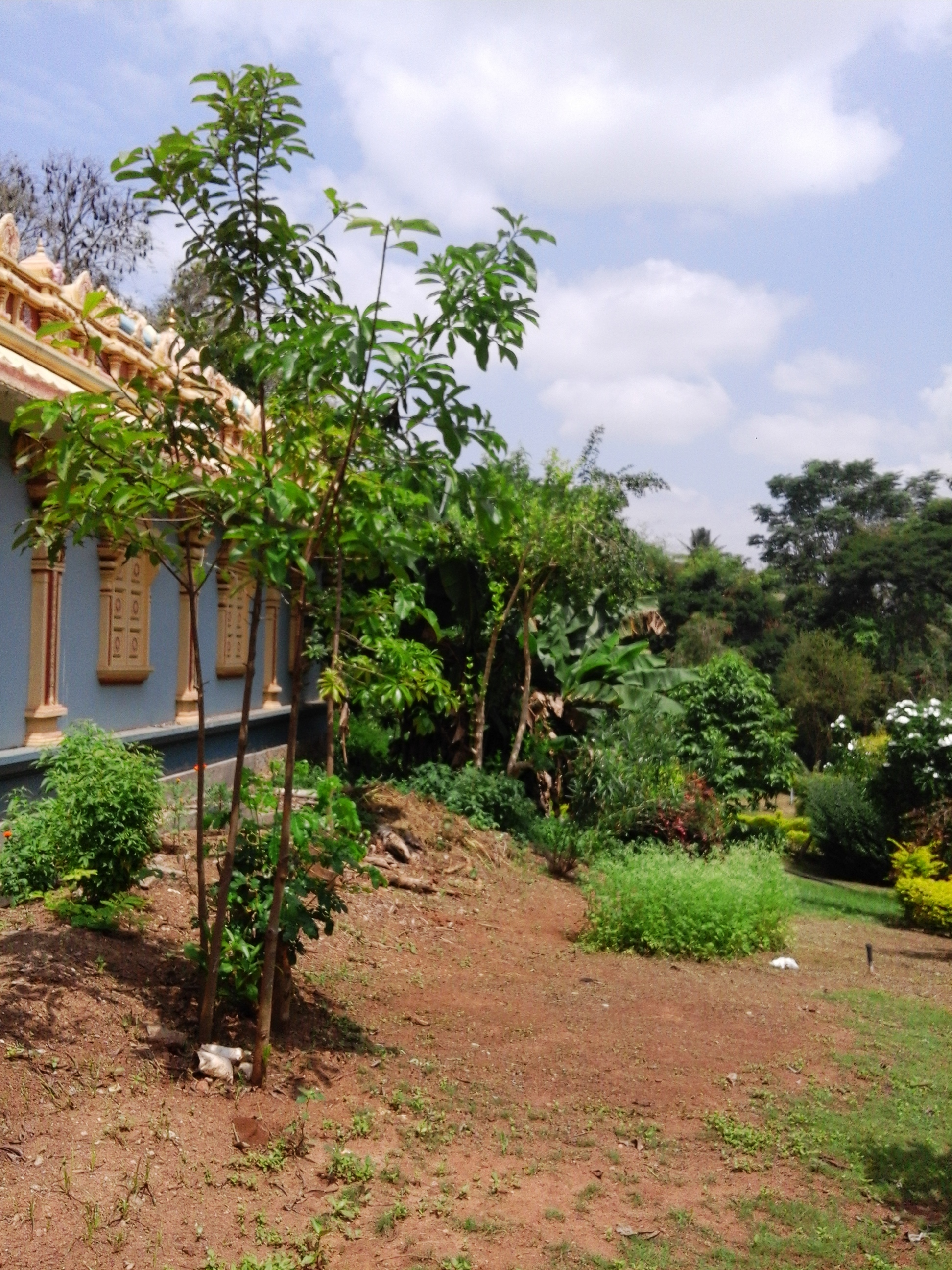
The temple garden

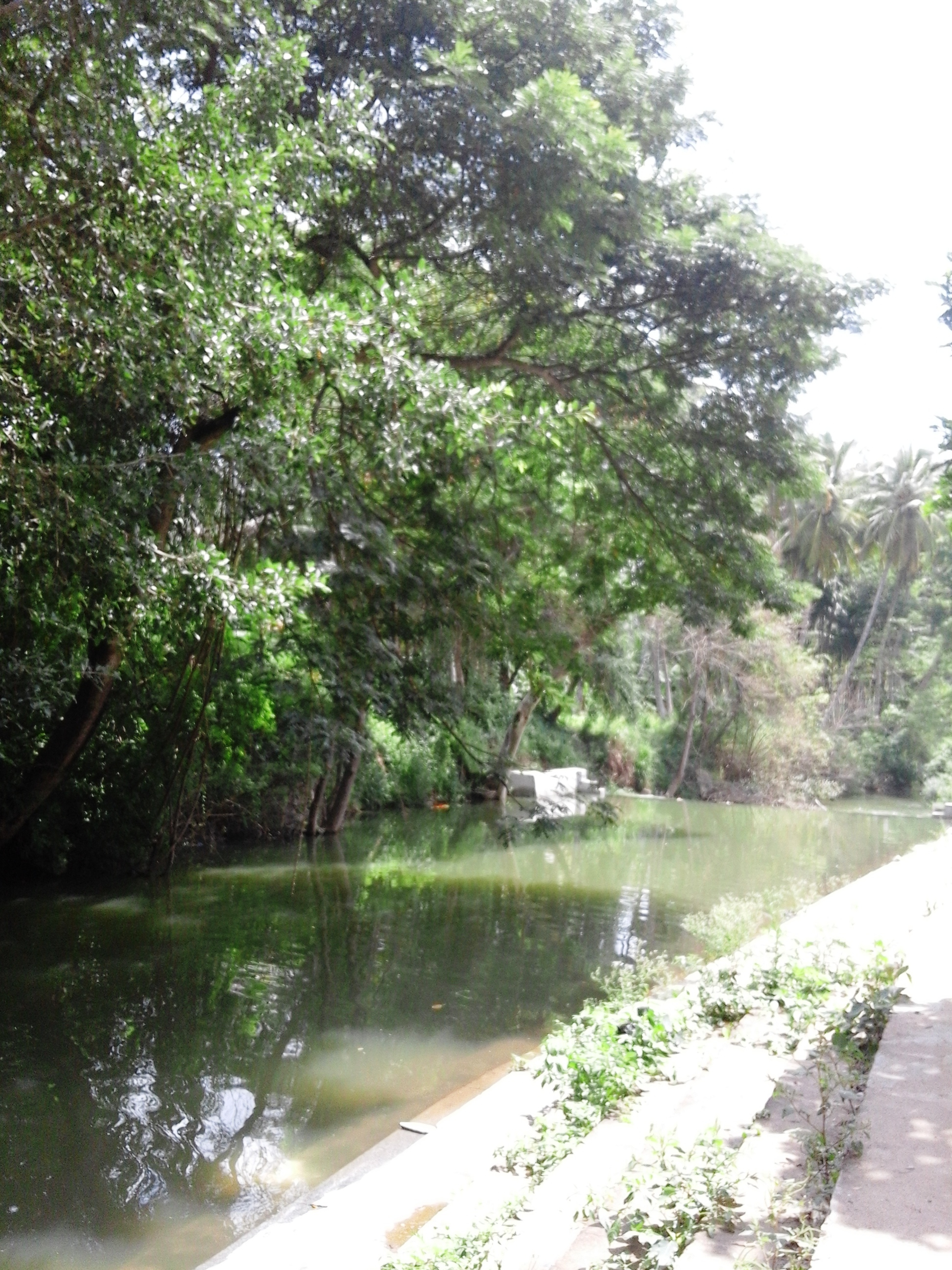
Bathing ghat
