= Bogadi, Mysore =

Census town in Mysore, Karnataka, India

Bogadi
- Town
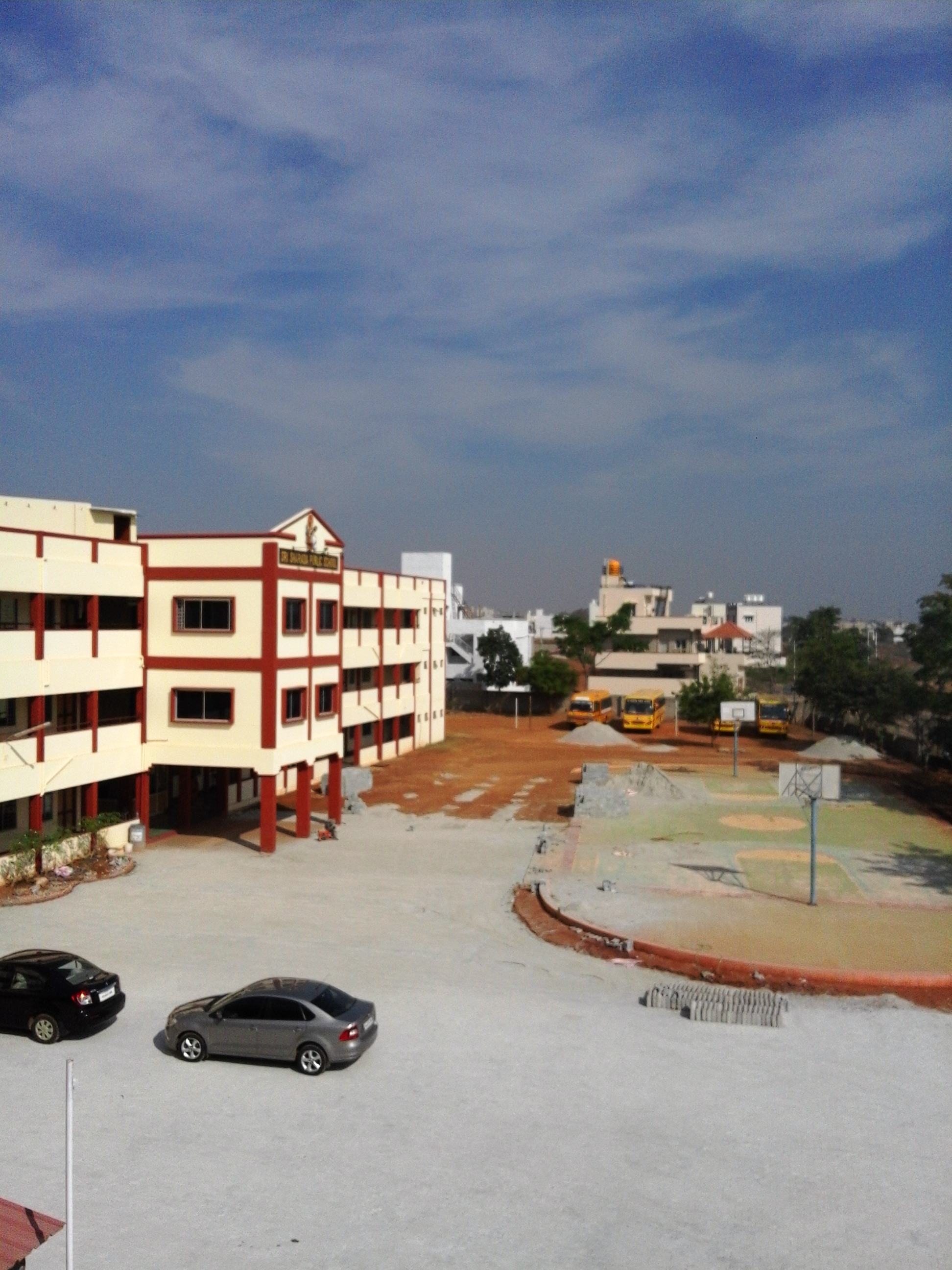
- Sharada School Bogadi with Skyline

- Bogadi, Mysuru, Karnataka, India
- Coordinates: 12.3°N 76.6°E
- Country: India
- State: Karnataka
- District: Mysore
- Established: 1962 with Railway Layout

Government
  - Type: Town Panchayat
  - Body: Bogadi town panchayat

Area
  - Total: 32.35 km^{2} (12.49 sq mi)
- Elevation: 710 m (2,330 ft)

Population (2011)
  - Total: 23,410
  - Density: 723.6/km^{2} (1,874/sq mi)

Languages
  - Official: Kannada, English
- Time zone: UTC+5:30 (IST)
- Postal code: 570026
- Vehicle registration: KA09, KA55 and KA45.

Bogadi is a neighborhood in Mysore city in India. The town is located the limits of the Mysore Urban Development Authority, and Mysuru metropolitan area in Mysore district, Karnataka. Amrita Vishwa Vidyapeetham University's campus is located in this town.

== Geography ==
Bogadi is located on the western edge of Greater Mysuru, 8 kilometers from the foothills of the Chamundi hills, beyond the first ring road surrounding Mysore. Bogadi covers a total area of 32.35 square kilometers. According to the 2011 census, the combined greater Bogadi area had a total population of 23,410.

== Transportation ==
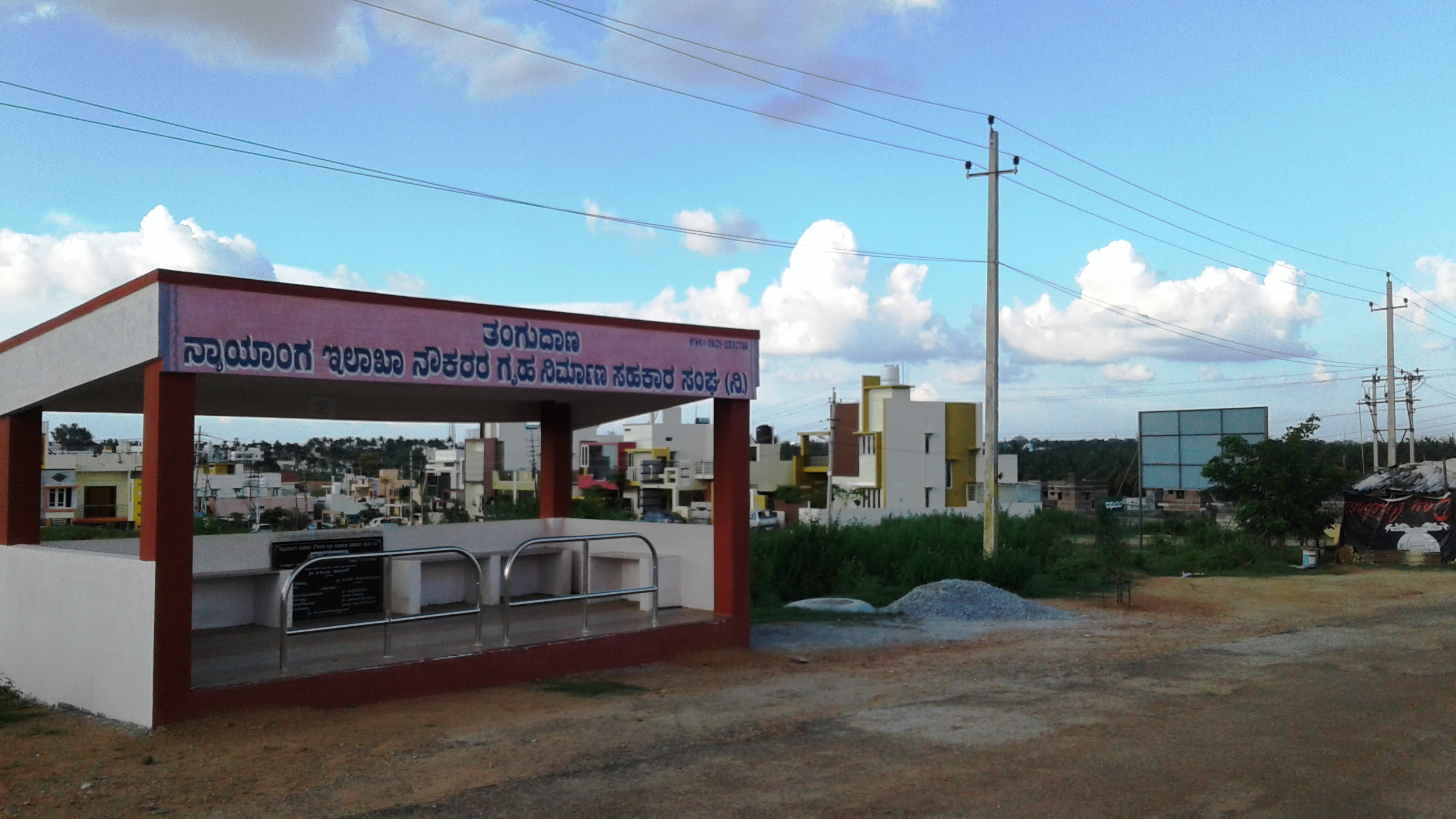
Bus Stop Near Christ School

There are 5 city bus lines which connect Bogadi to Mysore; they are 68, 69G, 69J, 91G and 245, and stop at Christ School, Bogadi town.

== Demographics ==
According to the 2011 Indian census, Bogadi had a population of 9,041. The surrounding villages of Madagalli consisted of 2,617 people, Hemmanahalli consisted of 1,207 people, Maratikyathanahalli had 5,122 people, Jattihundi had 1,322 people, Kergalli had 4,068 people and Kemmanapura had 37 people bringing the total population to 23,407. Males constitute 53% of the population and females 47%. Bogadi has an average literacy rate of 64%, higher than the national average of 59.5%, with male literacy of 70% and female literacy of 57%. 11% of the population is under 6 years of age.

== See also ==
- Bogadi Road
- Raja Rajeshwari Nagar, Mysore

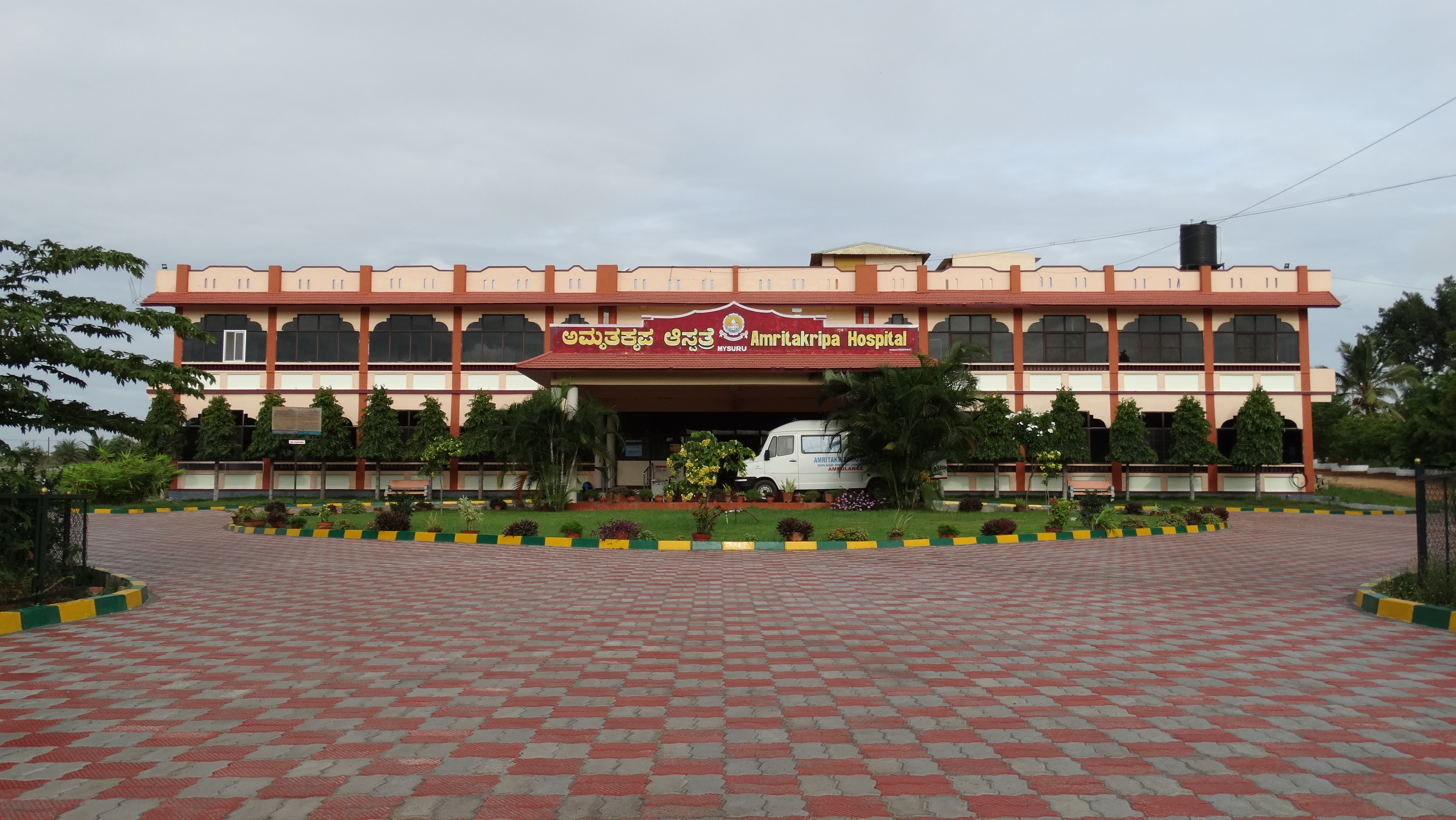
Amritakripa Hospital

== Image Gallery ==
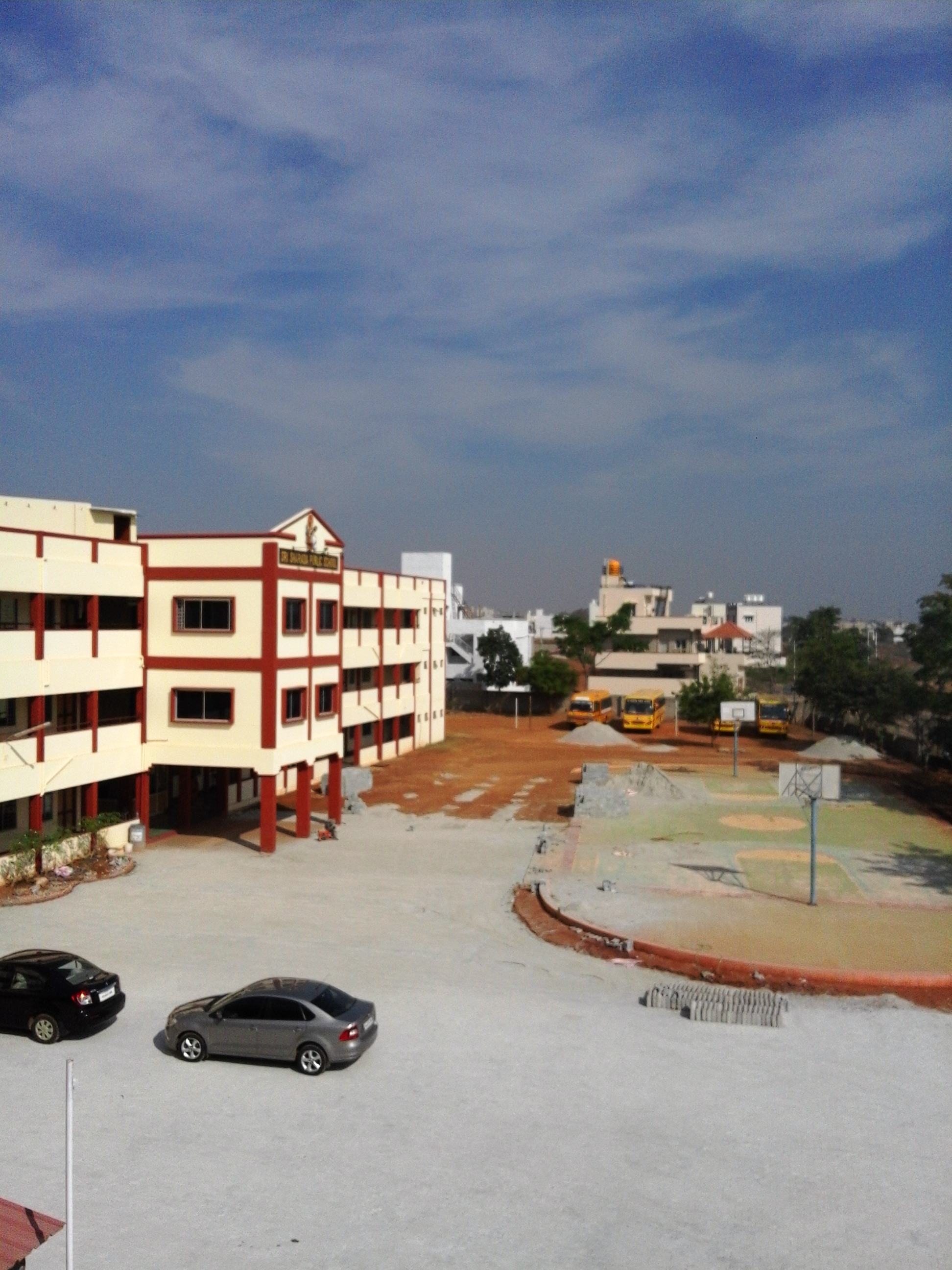
Sharada Public School

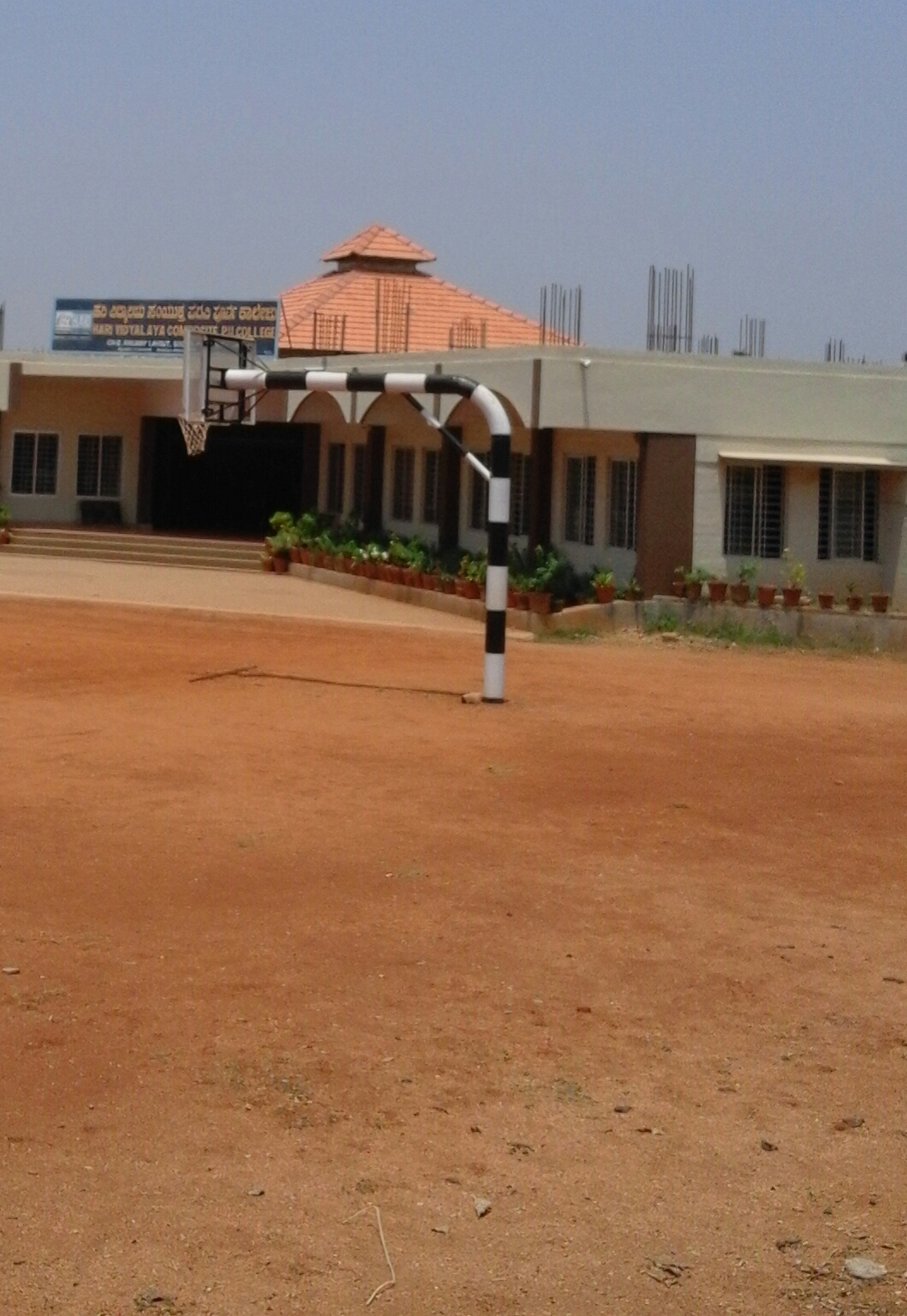
Hari Vidyalaya

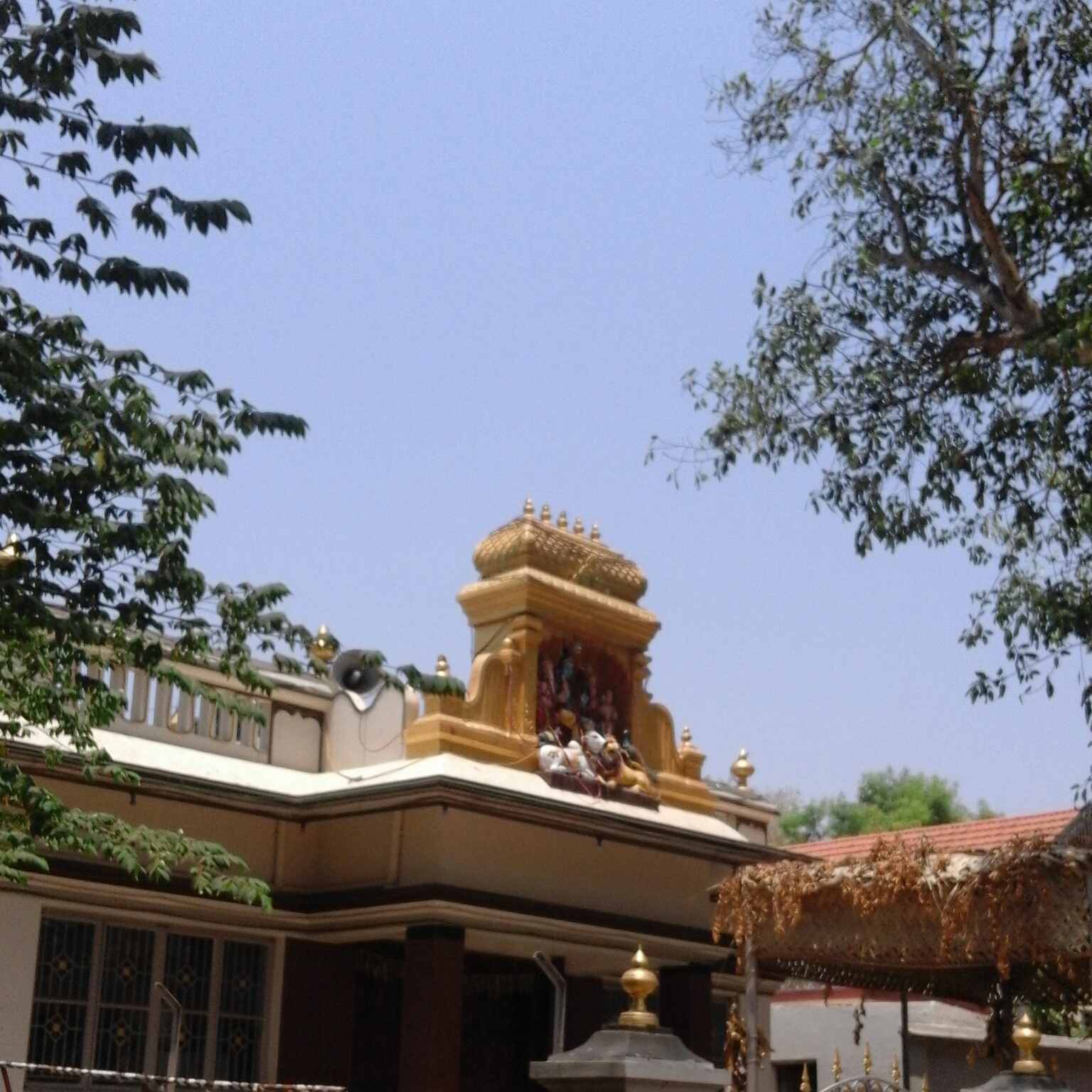
Temple in Bogadi

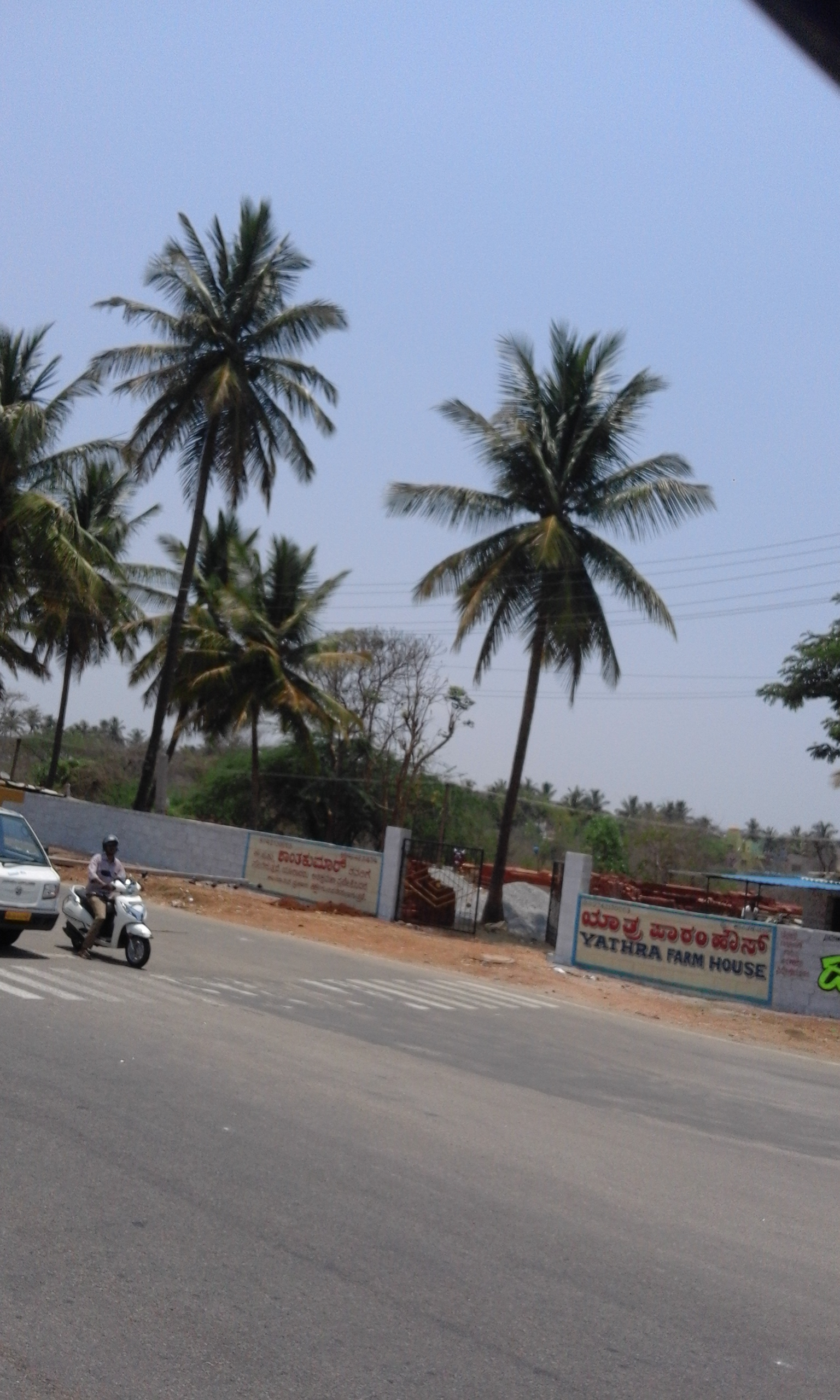
Ringroad

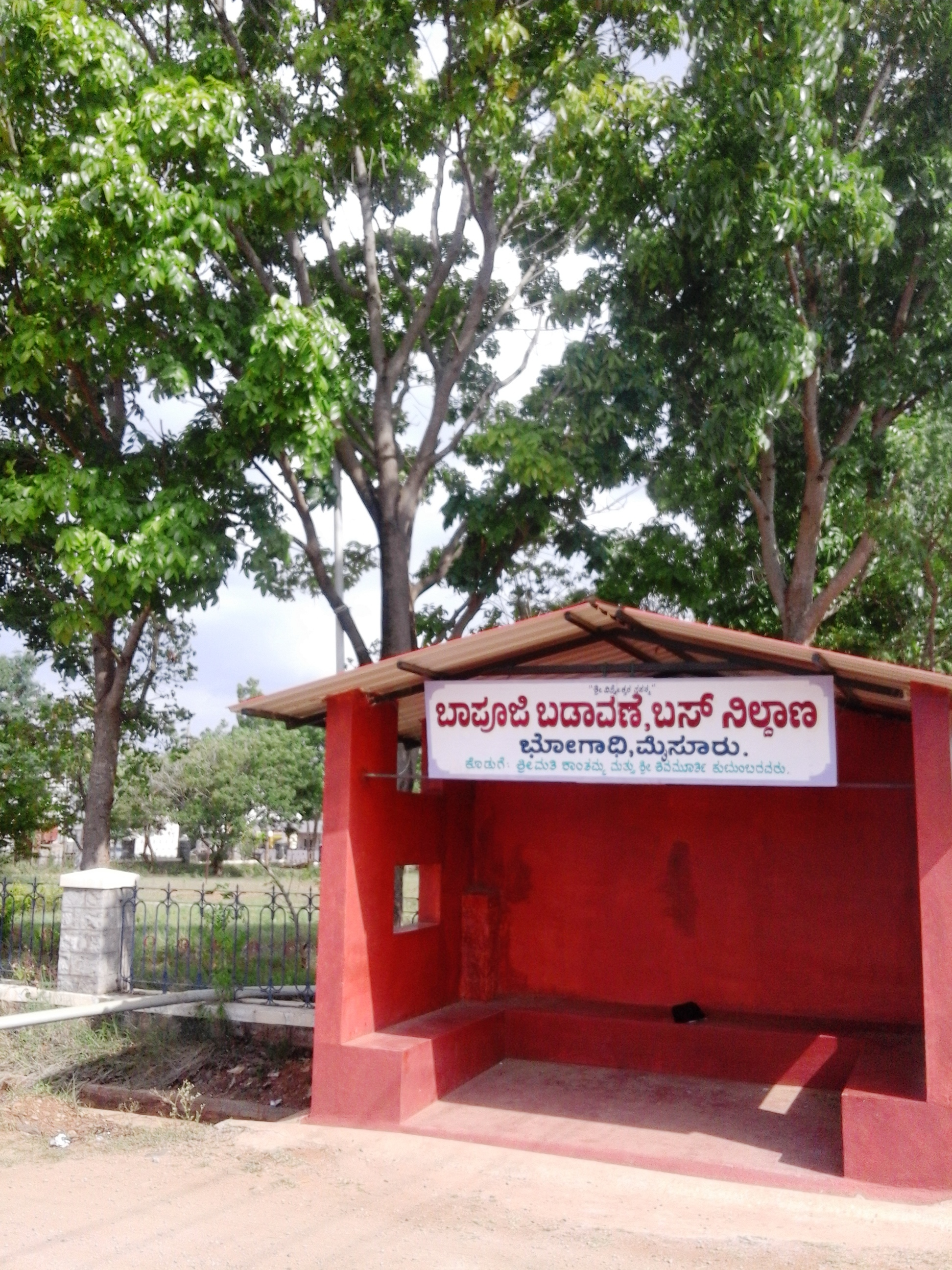

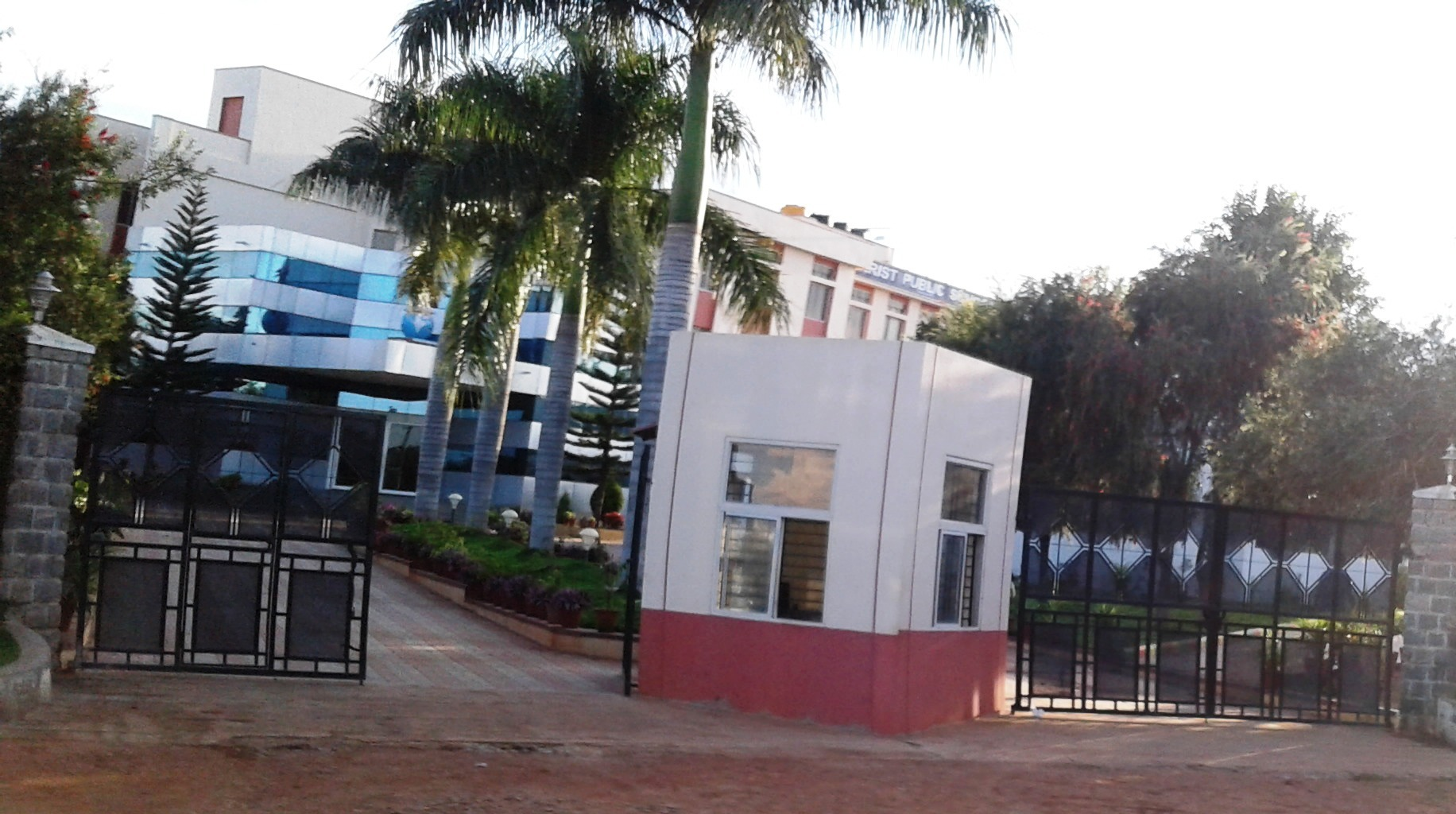

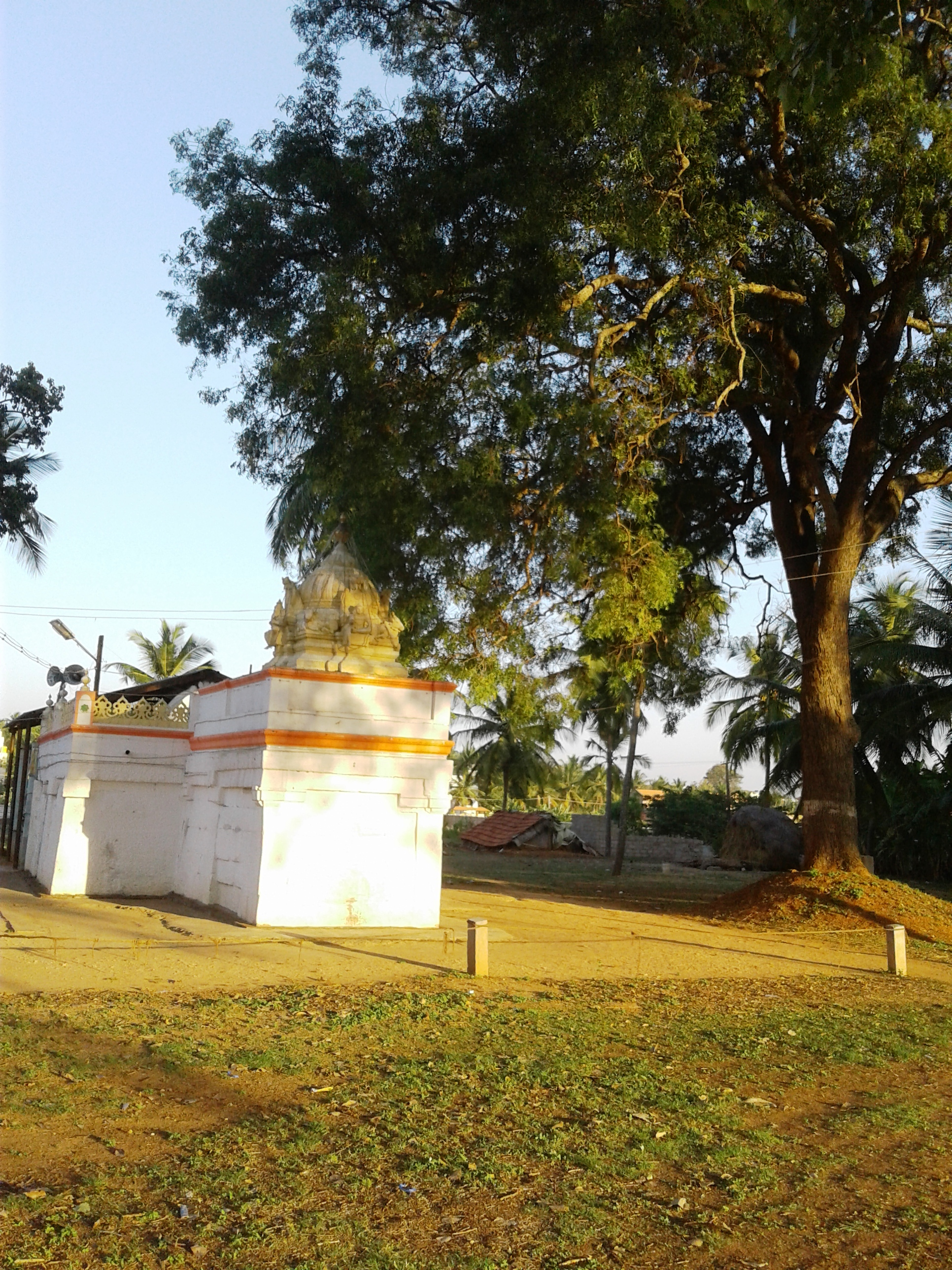

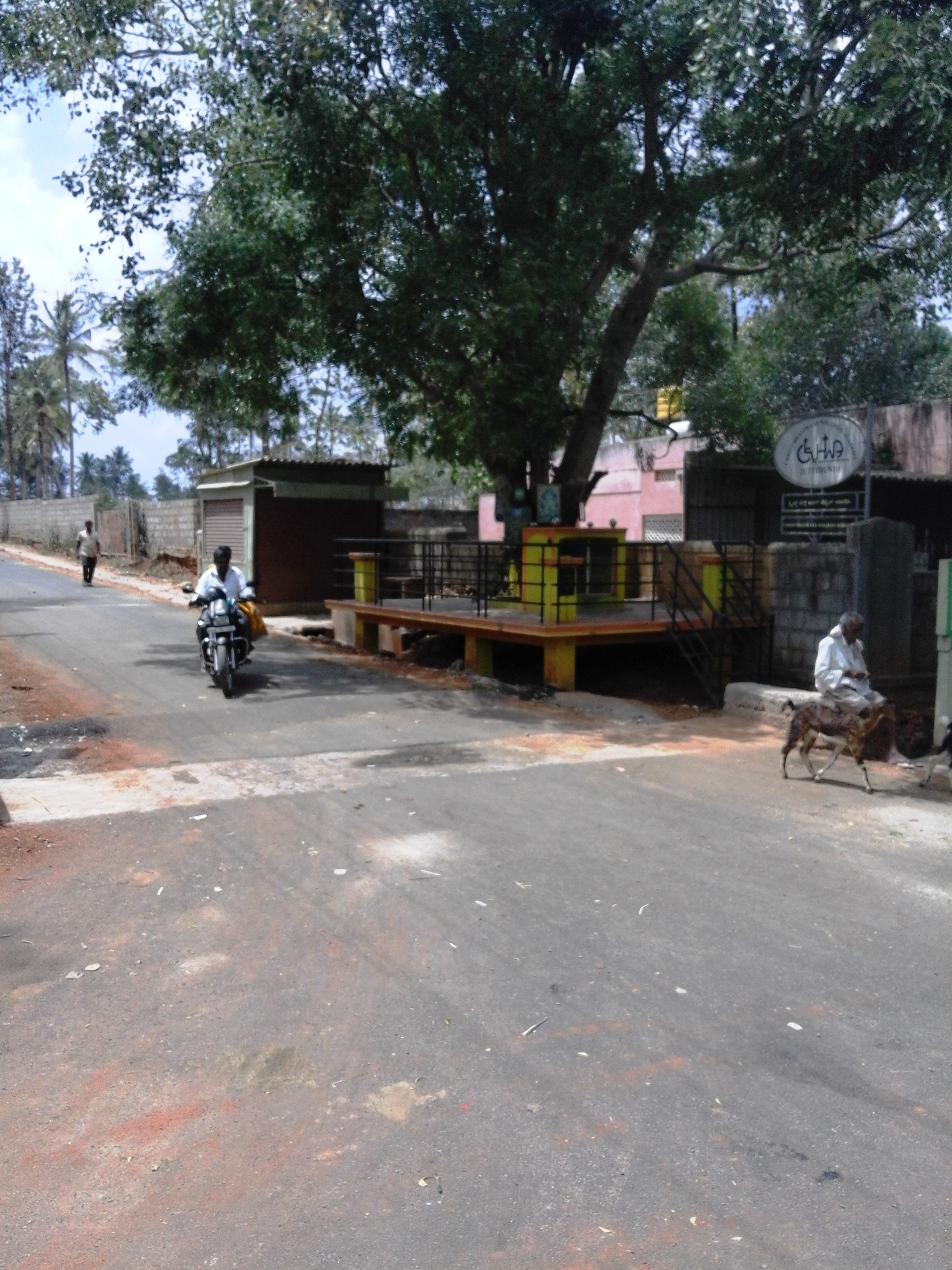
