= Rajarajeshwari Nagar, Mysore =

Coordinates: 12.287301°N 76.602278°E

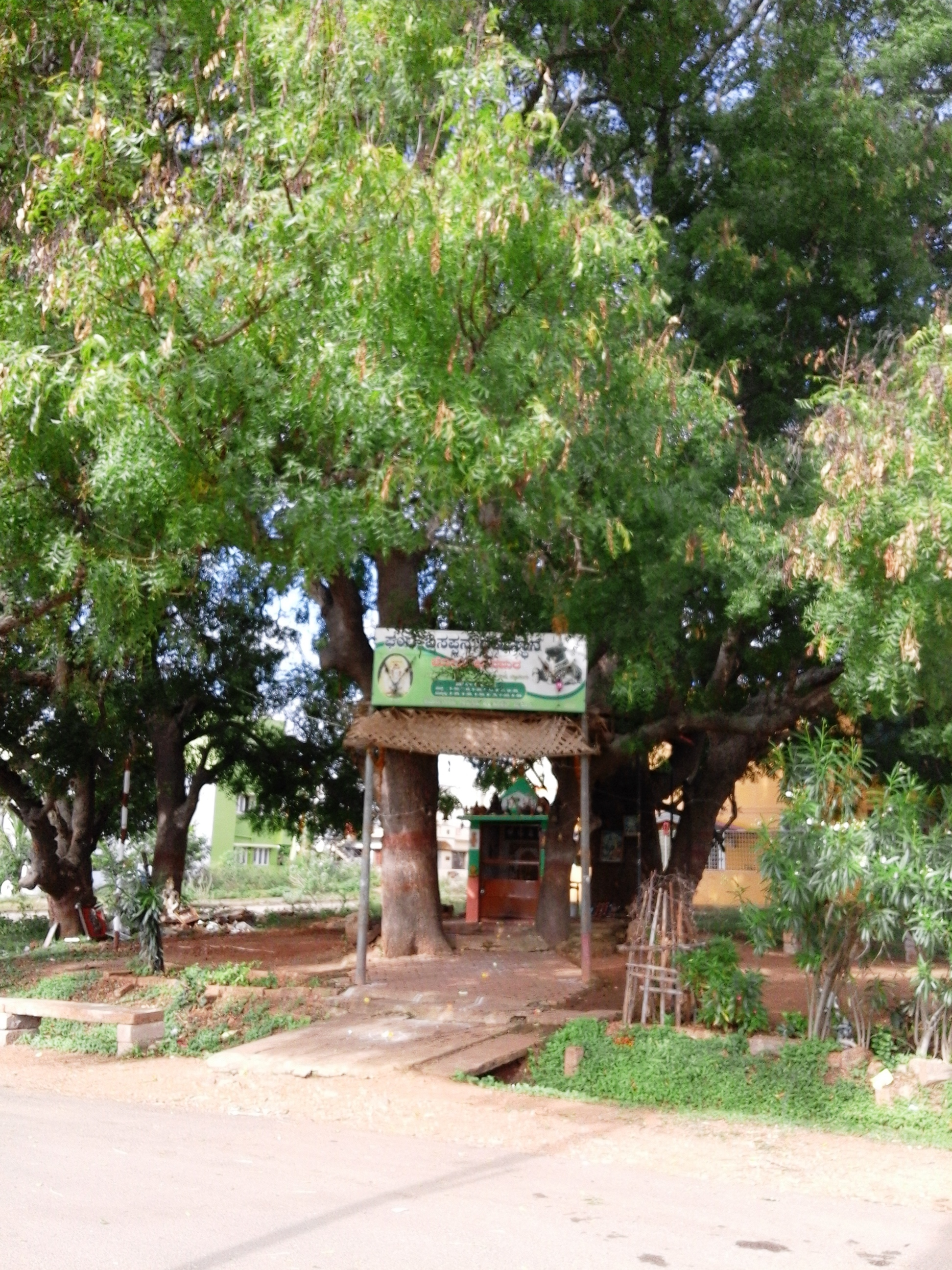
Temple at Rajarajeshwari Nagar, Mysore

Raja Rajeshwari Nagar is a residential suburb of Mysore city in the state of Karnataka of the nation of India and is located in the Greater Bhogadi area of the city.

== Location ==
Raja Rajeshwari Nagar is located to the west of Mysore city, immediately outside the ring road.

== Demographics ==
Raja Rajeshwari Nagar is a predominantly Hindu locality. Most of the houses are newly constructed, as this is a newly developed layout. This locality comes outside the ring road encircling Mysore, but is considered part of the city. Bus number 69 goes to this locality.

== Landmarks ==
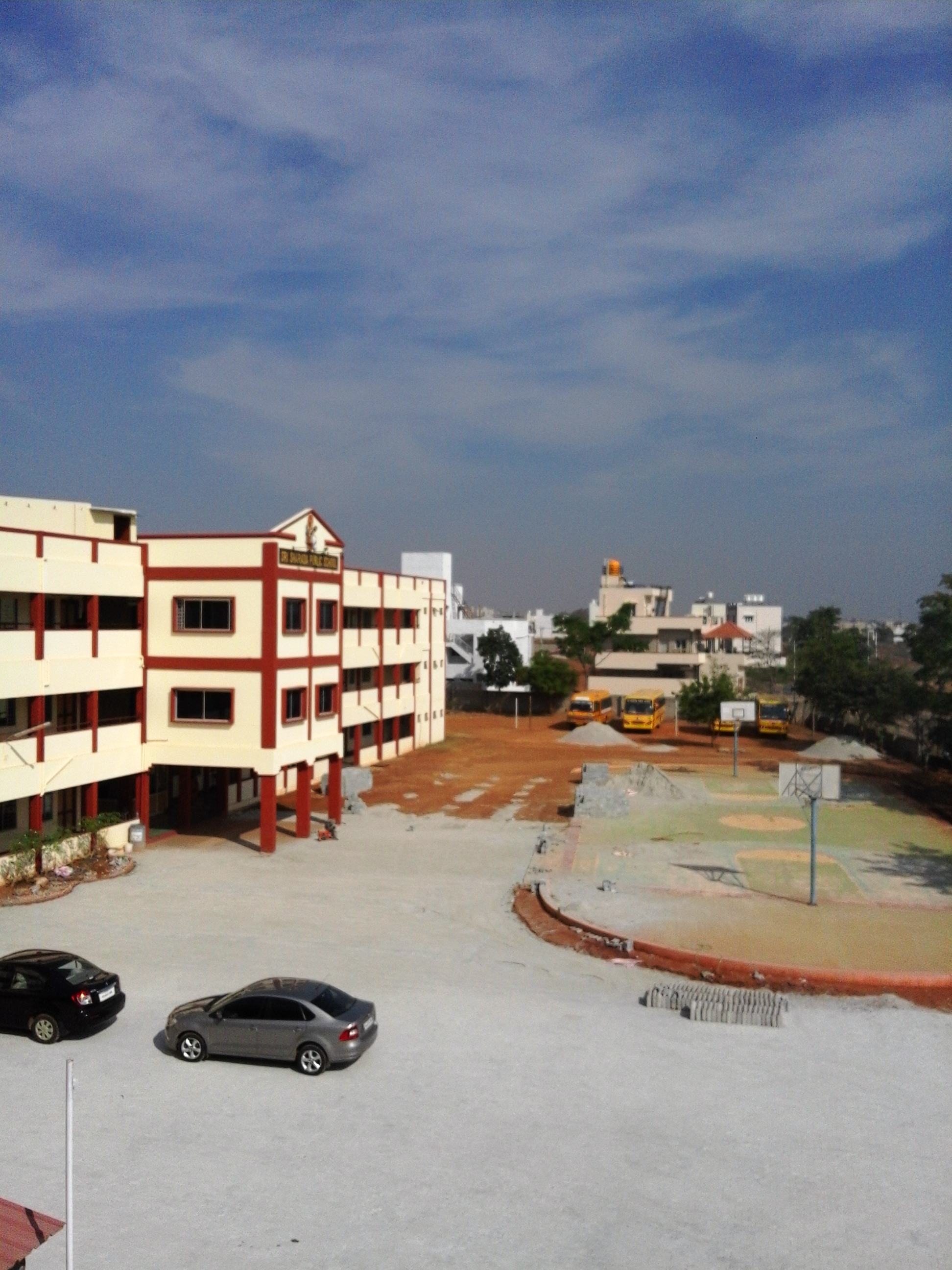
Sharada Public School

- P. K. V. Acharya Sabha Bhavana
- Sara Convention Circle
- Christ Public School
- Hari Vidyalaya
- Natya Samskrithi Kalani Kendra
- Rainbow Public School
- Bhairaveshwara Function Hall
- Euro Kids School

== Suburbs and Layouts ==
- Somanath Nagar
- Dattagalli Layout
- Adhithya Circle
- Kergalli Layout
- Railway Layout
- Nivedhitha Nagar
- CFTRI Layout

== Image Gallery ==
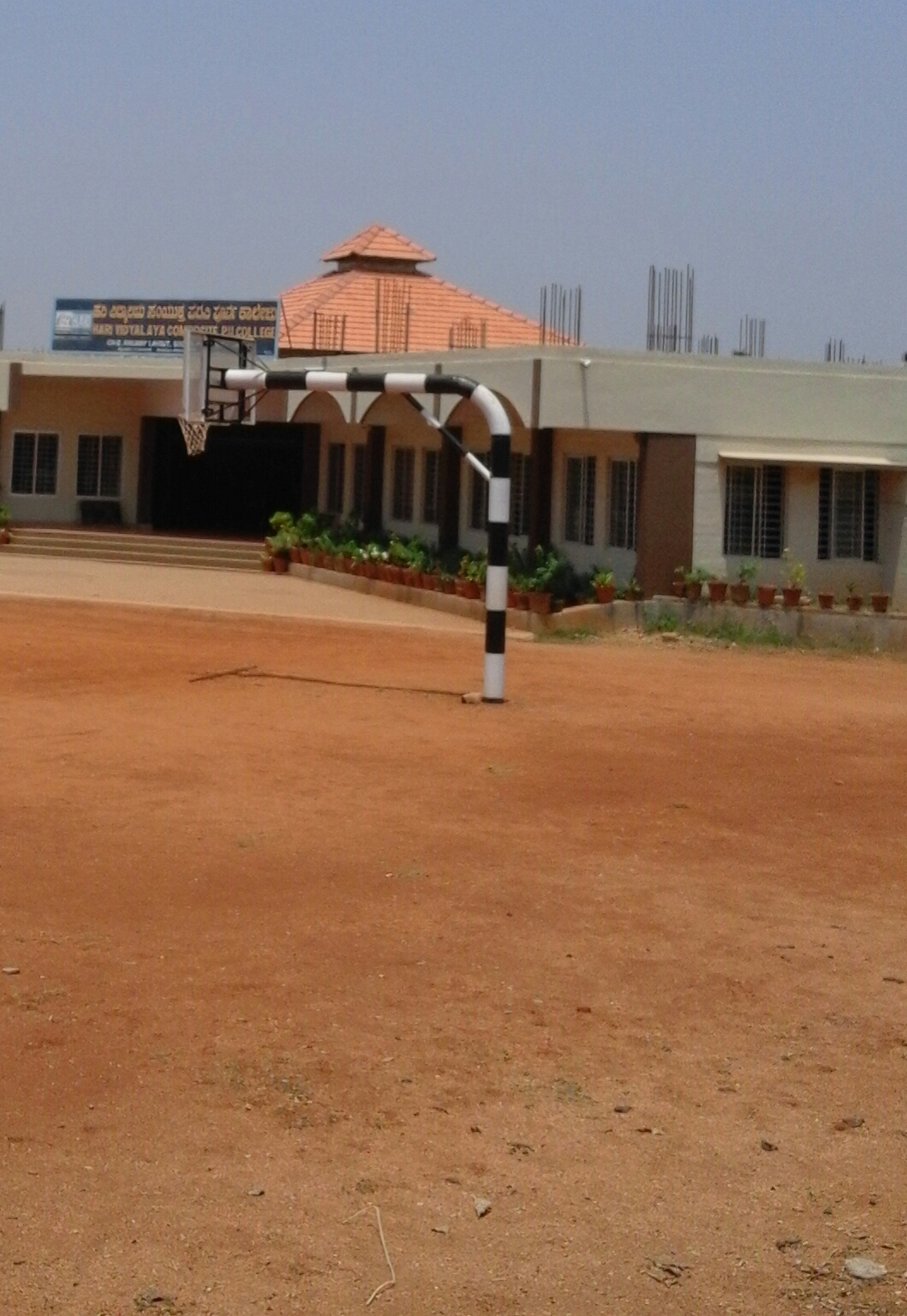
Hari Vidyalaya

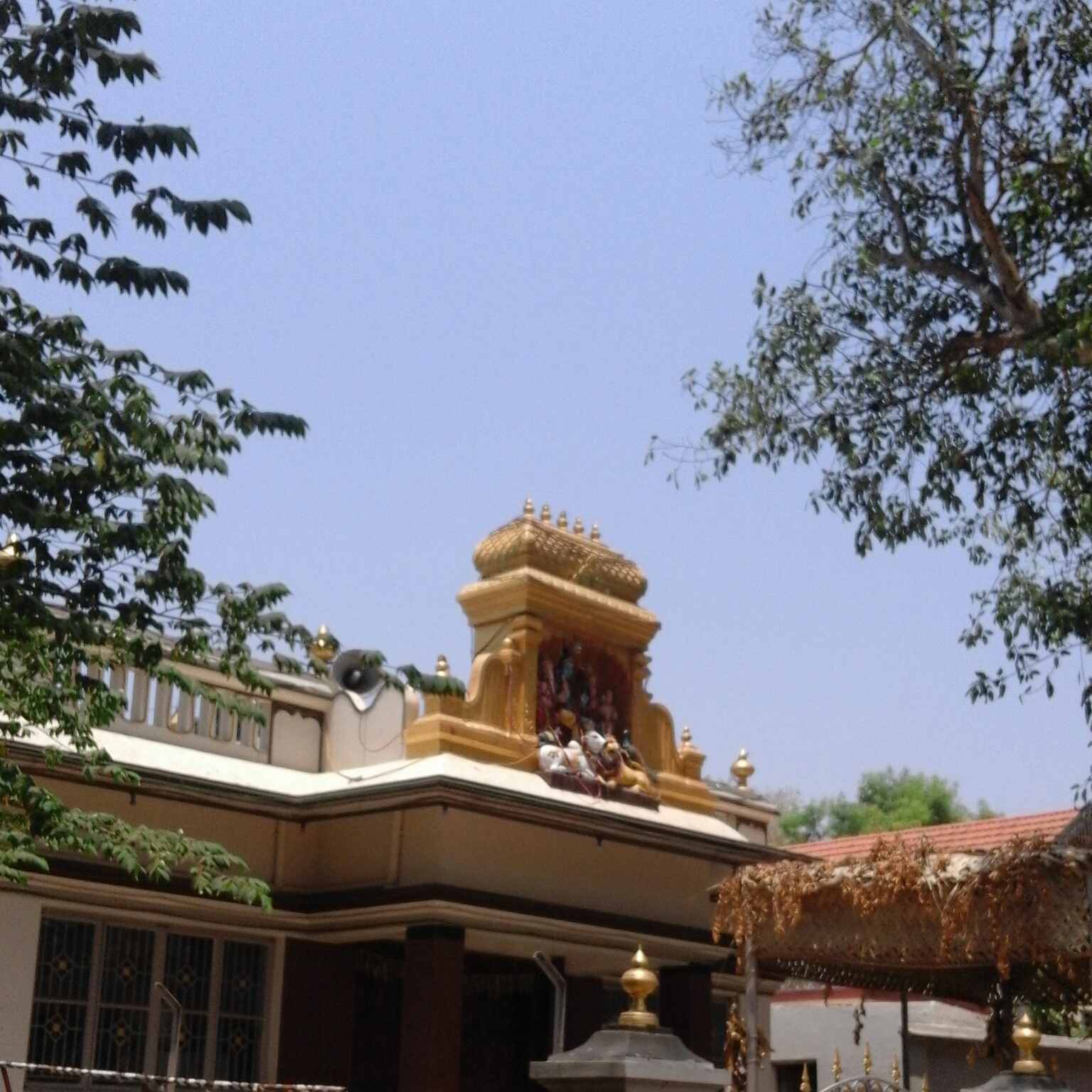
Temple in Bogadi

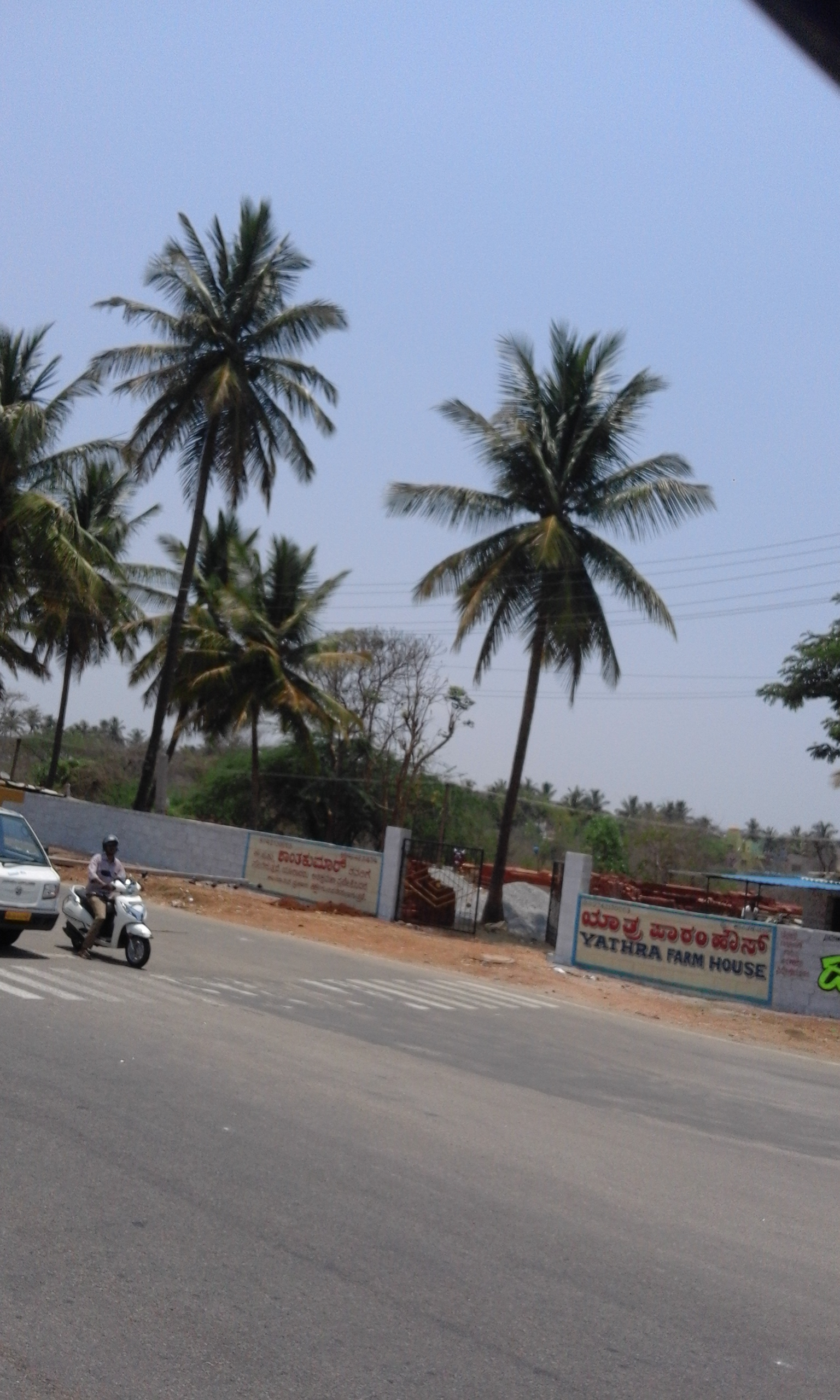
Ringroad

== See also ==
- Bhogadi
