= Hampapura, Mysore =

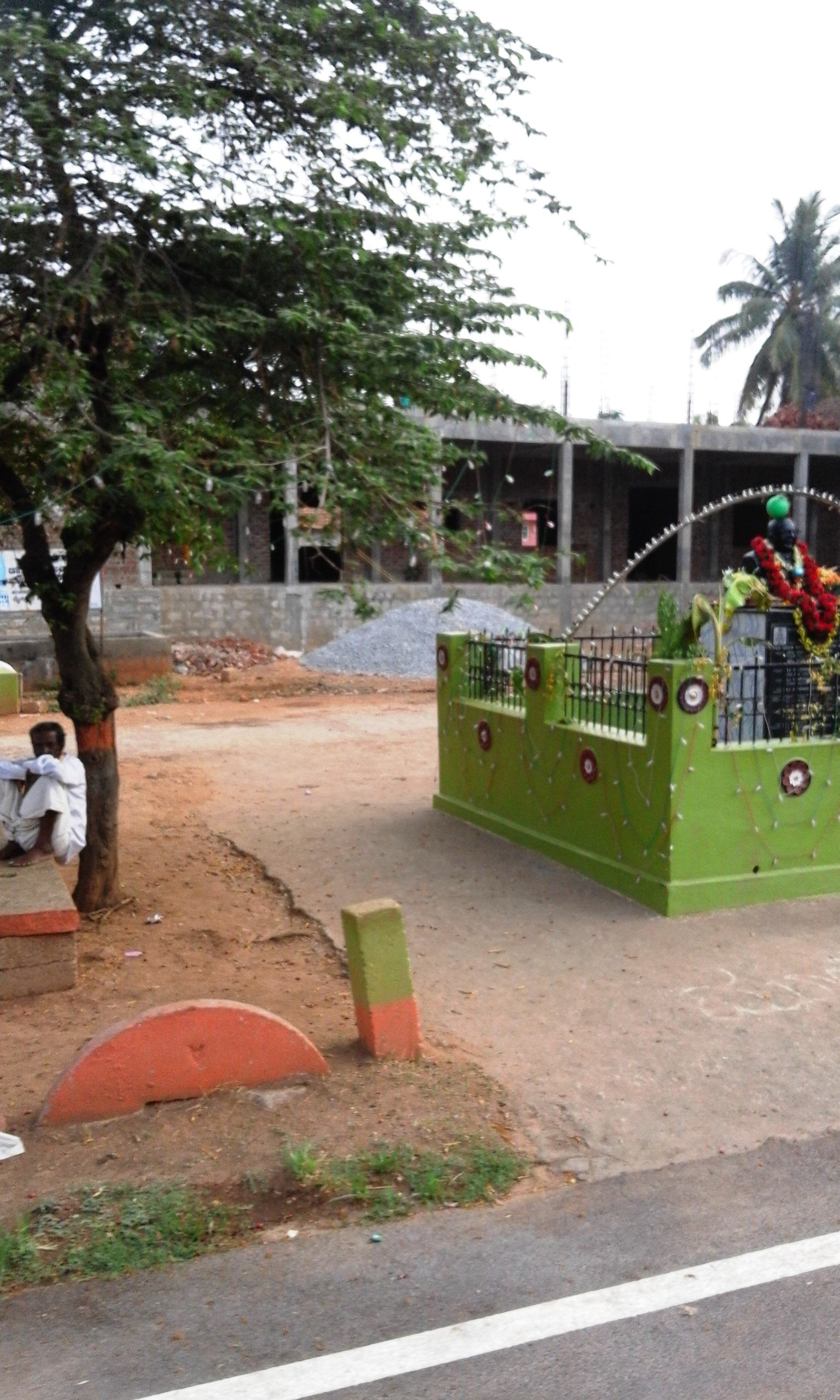
Hampapura, Mysore

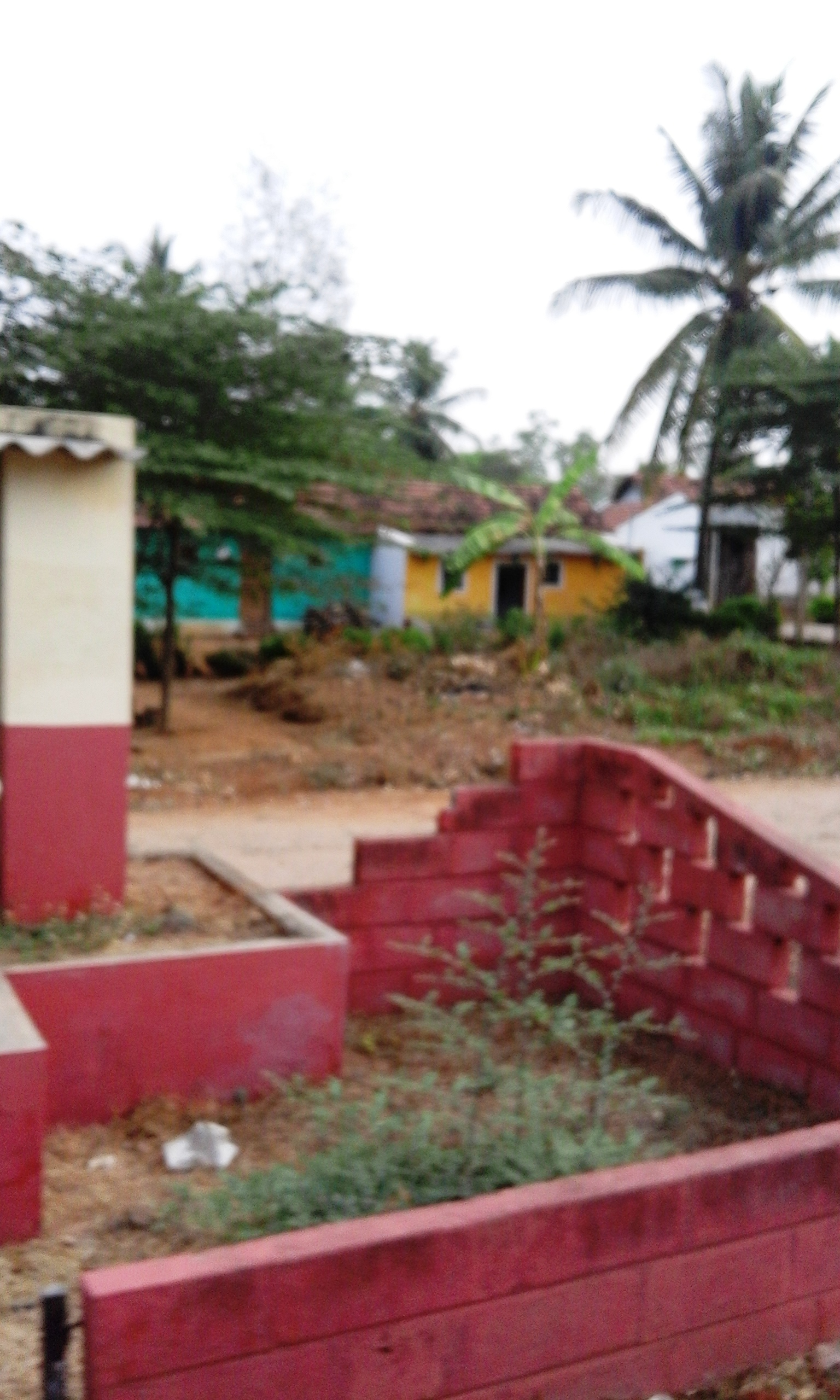
Hampapura village

Hampapura is a small village in Mysore, Karnataka province, India.

== Location ==
Hampapura is located on Mananthavady Road at a distance of 46 kilometres (29 mi) from Mysore.

== Demographics ==
As of 2011, there are 4288 people living in Hampapura village, with 2121 being male and 2167 being female. In 2011, children formed 9% of the village population. The overall literacy rate of the village is 70%, however, the female literacy rate remains smaller, being reported at 62%. There are 1,024 houses in the village.

== Post Office ==
The post office in Hampapura has the postal code of 571125.
