= Mysore Urban Development Authority =

Government agency in India

MUDA
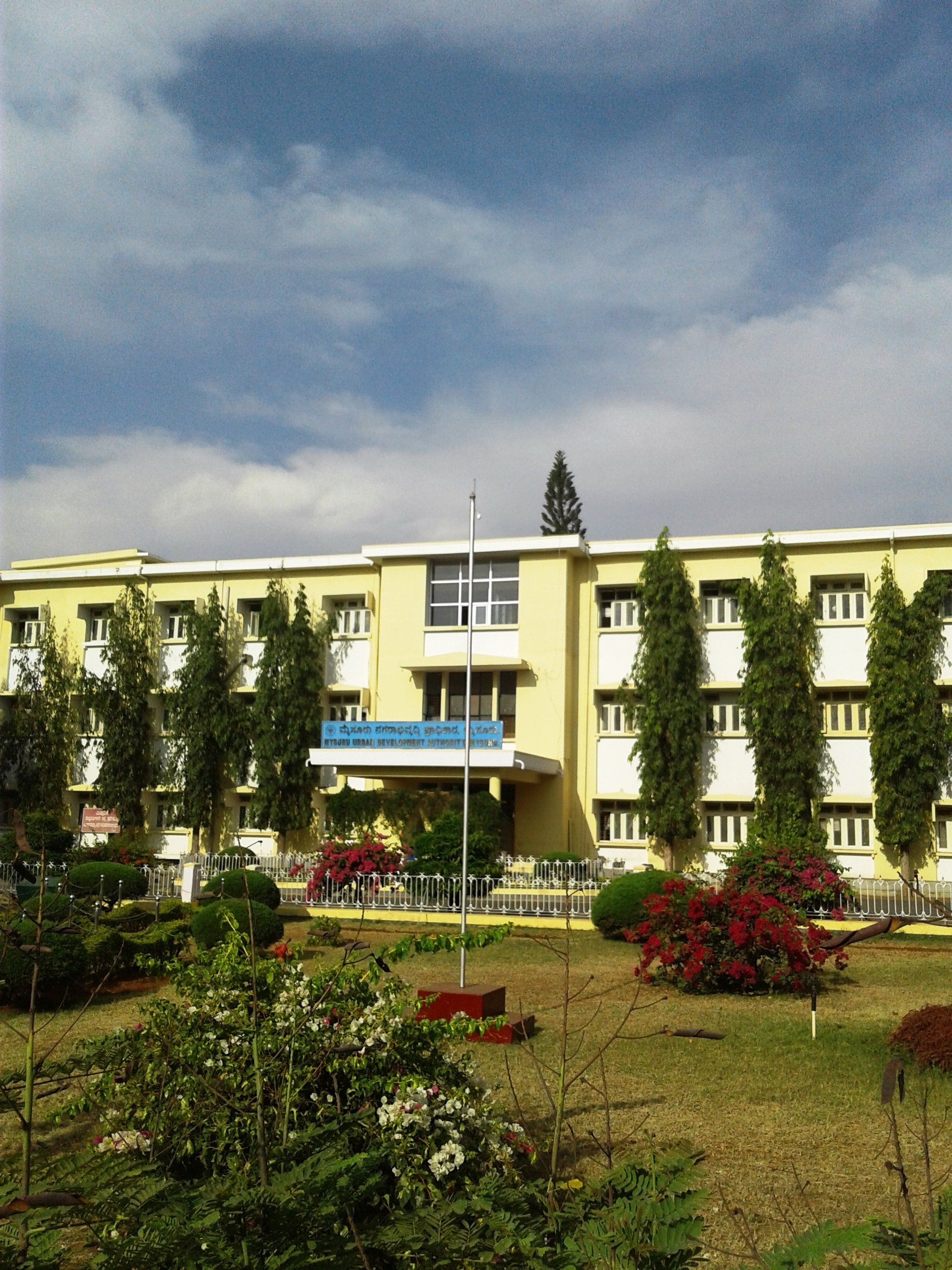
- Type: Development corporation
- Founded: 16 May 1988 (38 years ago)
- Headquarters: Mysore, Karnataka, India
- Area served: Mysore, Nanjangud, Hootagalli, Srirampura, Bhogadi, Kadakola, Rammanahalli and Other Villages and Towns Inside Mysuru, Nanjangud Taluks and Srirangapatna Taluk of Mandya District.
- Key people: H. V. Rajeev (Chairman), Dr. D. B. Natesh Commissioner
- Website: http://www.mudamysore.gov.in/

The Mysore (Officially Mysuru) Urban Development Authority (MUDA) of Mysore, India, is a governmental organization that oversees planning and development of infrastructure, provision of development-related sites and services, and the housing needs of underprivileged citizens in Mysore.

The Mysore Urban Development Authority was constituted on 16 May 1988 from the KUDA Act of 1987.

MUDA Covers the area of Mysuru Urban Agglomeration area covering Mysore, Hootagalli, Srirampura, Bhogadi, Kadakola, Rammanahalli and outgrowths which have a total combined population of 1,060,120 covering 286 km^{2}.

The City Development Plan 2031 defines the metropolitan area of Mysore-Nanjangud covering 509sq.km.

== Projects ==
MUDA takes up infrastructural projects in the Mysuru Urban Region, MUDA has created several projects such as:

- Outer Ring Road
- Hinkal Flyover
- Vijaynagar
- JP Nagar
- Devanur Layout
- Sathgalli Layout
- Kyathamaranahalli Layout
- Rabindranath Tagore Nagar

== Departments ==
Several Departments of MUDA are

- Land Acquisition Department
- Town Planning Department
- Engineering Department
- Allotment & General Administration Department
- Finance Department
- Law Department
- Public Relations Department

== Mysuru Urban Agglomeration and Metropolitan Region ==
Mysuru has grown beyond its corporation limits and has become an urban agglomeration. Until 2020, the parts of UA outside the corporation limits were handled by Gram panchayats and had a population of 9,90,990 according to 2011 census. In November 2020, Many of there Gram Panchayats were converted into bigger municipalities including the City Municipal Council of Hootagalli, Town Panchayats of Bhogadi, Srirampura, Kadakola and Rammanahalli and this increased the population to 1,060,120.

The metropolitan region of Mysuru contains the Urban Agglomeration of Mysuru, City of Nanjangud, Surrounding Villages in Mysuru and Nanjangud Taluks and Villages in Srirangapatna Taluk in Mandya district. As per City Development Plan 2031, this metropolitan area covers 509sq.km of area and has a population of 1,696,577.

== CDP 2031 ==
The city development plan 2031 is a master plan made by MUDA to serve the needs of the city by planning the expansion of the city by the year 2031. The CDP 2031 plans residential layouts, commercial areas, industrial areas, airport, roads and other public infrastructure. CDP 2031 defines the boundaries of Mysuru Local Planning District [Metropolitan Region] consisting of various villages in Mysuru, Nanjangud Taluks of Mysuru District and Srirangapatna Taluk of Mandya District. CDP 2031 includes Thandavapura, Nanjangud Industrial Areas in Nanjangud Taluk as well as Hebbal, Belavadi, Hootgalli, Koorgalli, Belagola and Metagally Industrial Areas of Mysuru Taluk. As per 2031 CDP, the metropolitan area is divided into 45 planning districts.

CDP 2031 aims to preserve heritage sites in Mysuru, strengthen economy, balance land use, make city slum free, maintaining and widening of roads and street lighting, develop eco-planning districts with agricultural zones, providing a metro rail system and more. Major proposals in CDP 2031 include decentralization of commercial district, satellite townshipat Jayapura and Yelawala and expansion of airport. CDP 2031 also defines various regulations for different types of buildings and structures for residential, commercial, industrial and other uses.

== Gallery ==
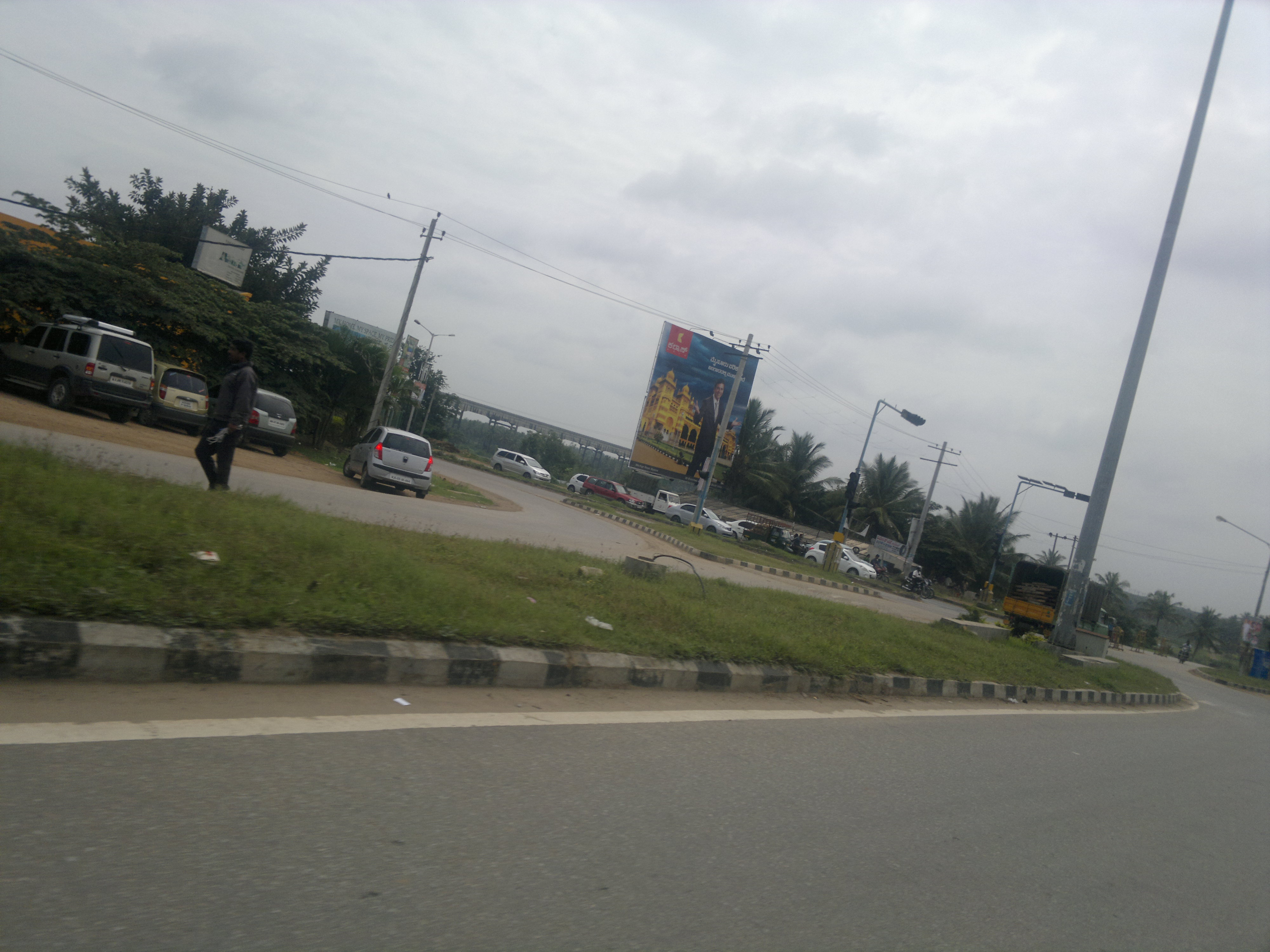

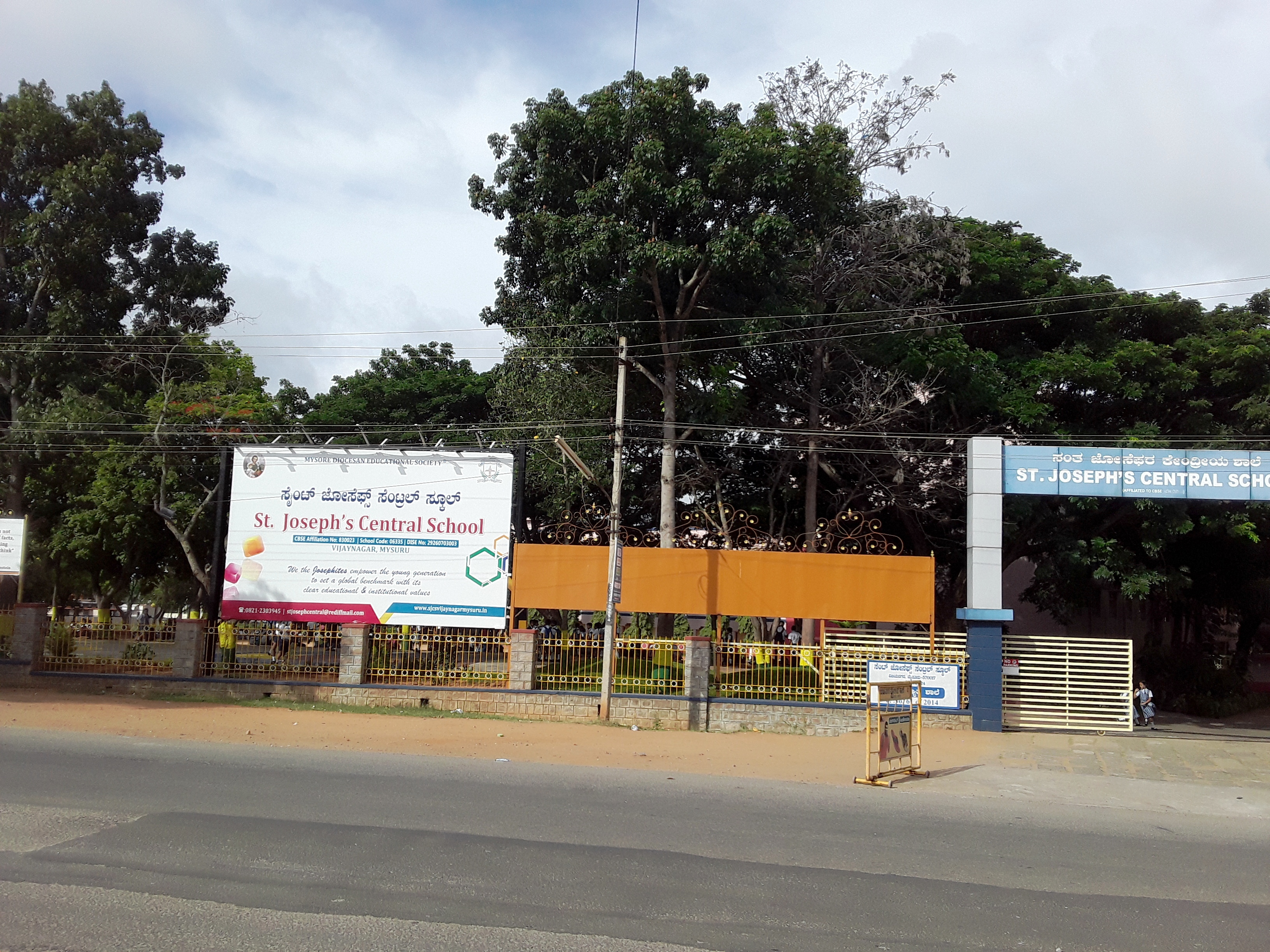

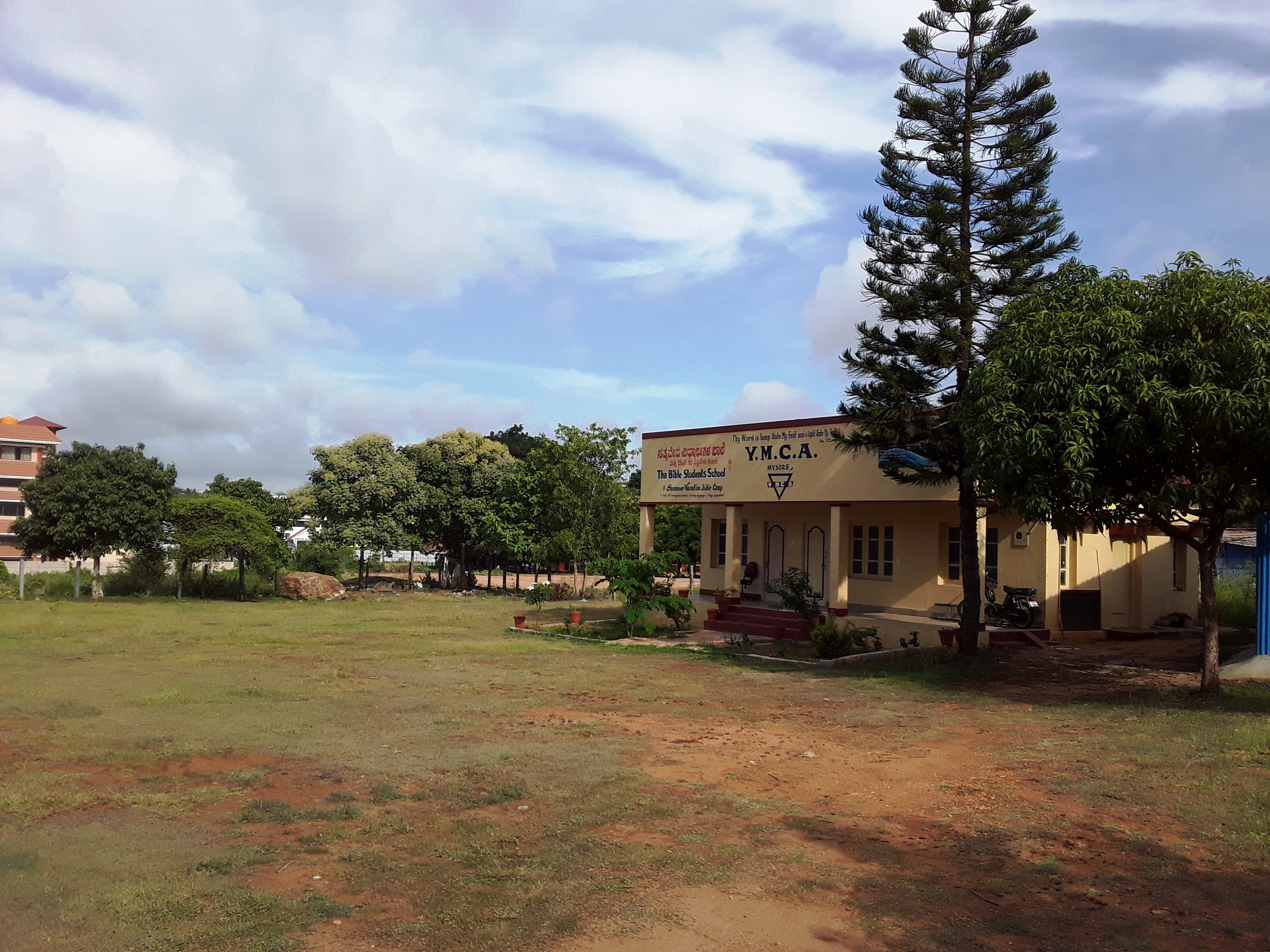

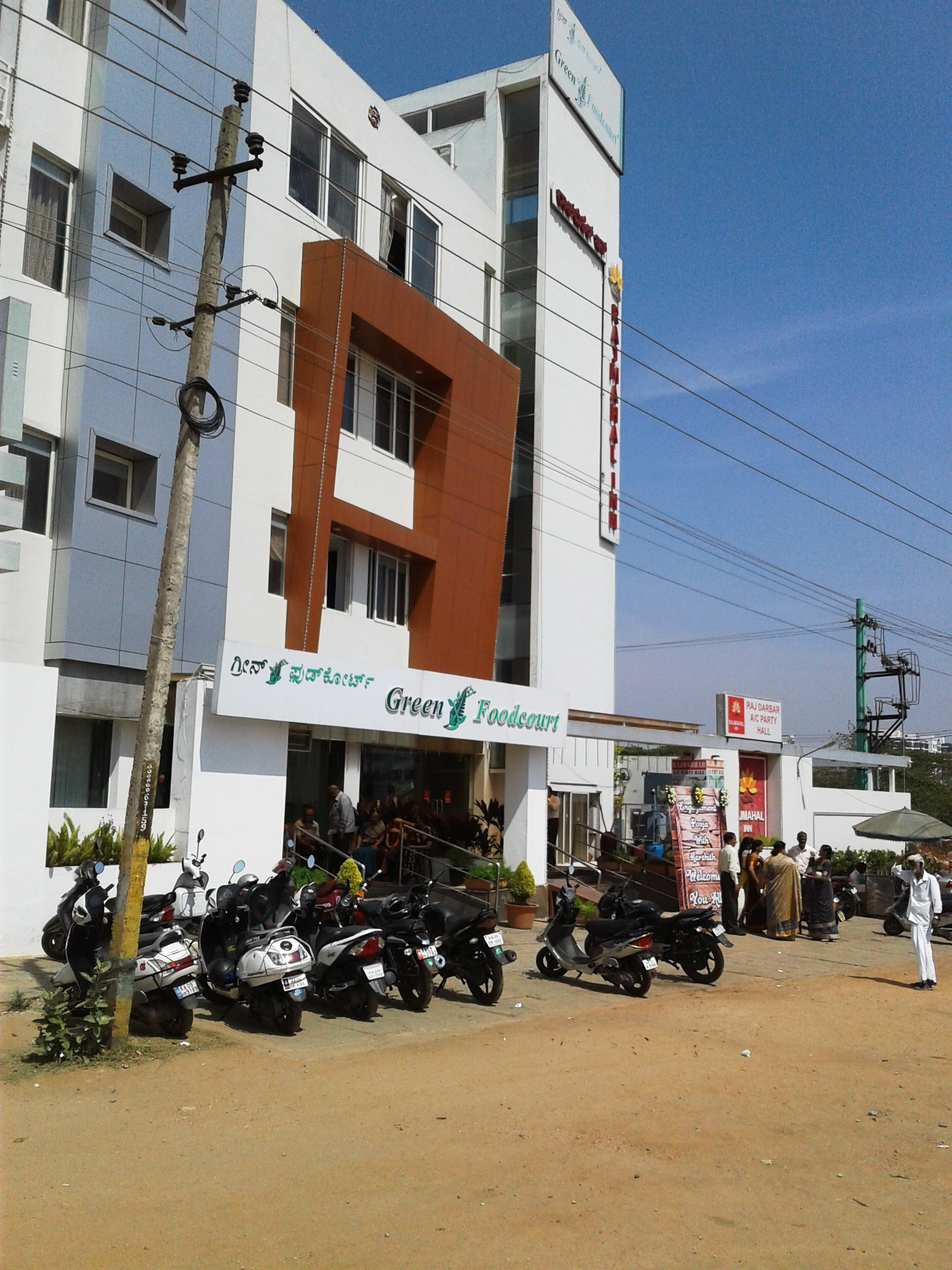
