= Kadakola =

- Town
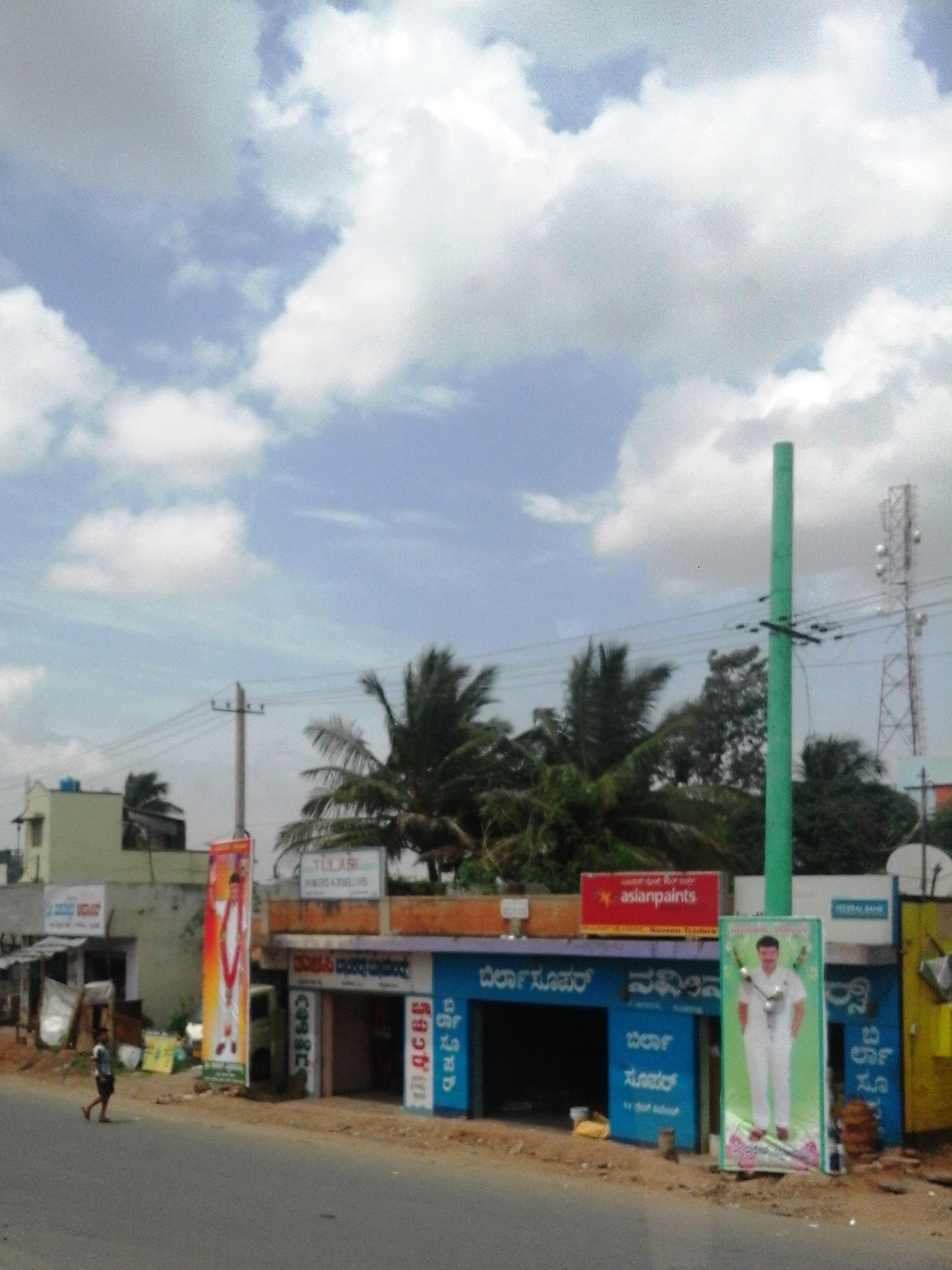
- Kadakola Town
- Interactive map of Kadakola
- Coordinates: 12°11′32″N 76°39′55″E
- Country: India
- State: Karnataka
- District: Mysore
- Talukas: Mysore

Government
  - Body: Town Panchayat

Area
  - Total: 34.71 km^{2} (13.40 sq mi)

Population (2011)
  - Total: 19,969
  - Density: 575.3/km^{2} (1,490/sq mi)

Languages
  - Official: Kannada
- Time zone: UTC+5:30 (IST)
- ISO 3166 code: IN-KA
- Vehicle registration: KA
- Nearest city: Mysore

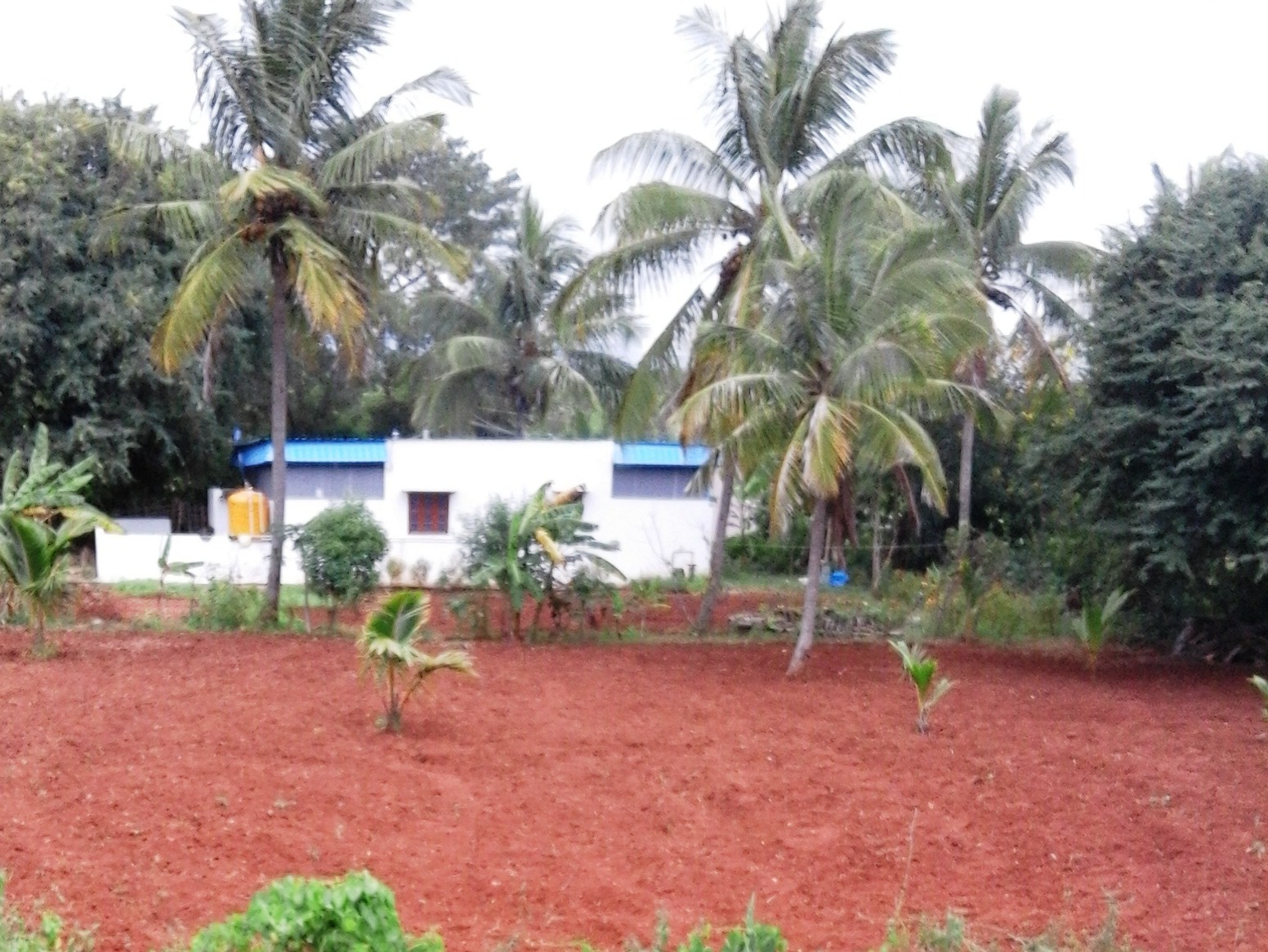
Coconut farm at Kadakola

Kadakola is a Town and a suburb of Mysuru metropolitan area in the southern state of Karnataka, India. It is located in the Mysore taluk of Mysore district. In November 2020, Kadakola was upgraded from a Gram Panchayat to a Town Panchayat and a gazetted notification was passed on November 26, 2020.^{2}. The combined population of the newly formed town is 19,969.

== Demographics ==
The newly formed town had a population of 19,315. The population breakdown is given below.

Area Name	Population According to Census 2011
Kadakola	6436
Mandakalli	3490
Marse	622
Badipalya	4357
Gudumadanahalli	777
Uttanahalli	1325
Hosahundi	2157
Madaragalli	151

== Post office ==
There is a post office at Kadakola and the postal code is 571311.

== Transportation ==
There is a small railway station at Kadakola where only slow trains to Mysore and Chamarajanagar stop. This railway station is part of Mysore-Chamarajanagar branch line. Buses are available to Mysore city which is 14.7 km away. The nearest airport is Mysuru airport at mandakalli which is 8 km away. The railway station also serves as a logistics hotspot with Inland Container Depot being built. Mysuru Airport is located in Mandakalli of Kadakola Town Panchayat.

== Villages and suburbs ==
Thandavapura (3 km), Sinduvalli (3 km), Someshwarapura (4 km), Devalapura (6 km), Hosahundi (7 km) are the nearby villages. Other nearby villages are Kongara, Nanjaianahundi, Beeregowdana hundi and Kardimarayana hundi.

== Image gallery ==
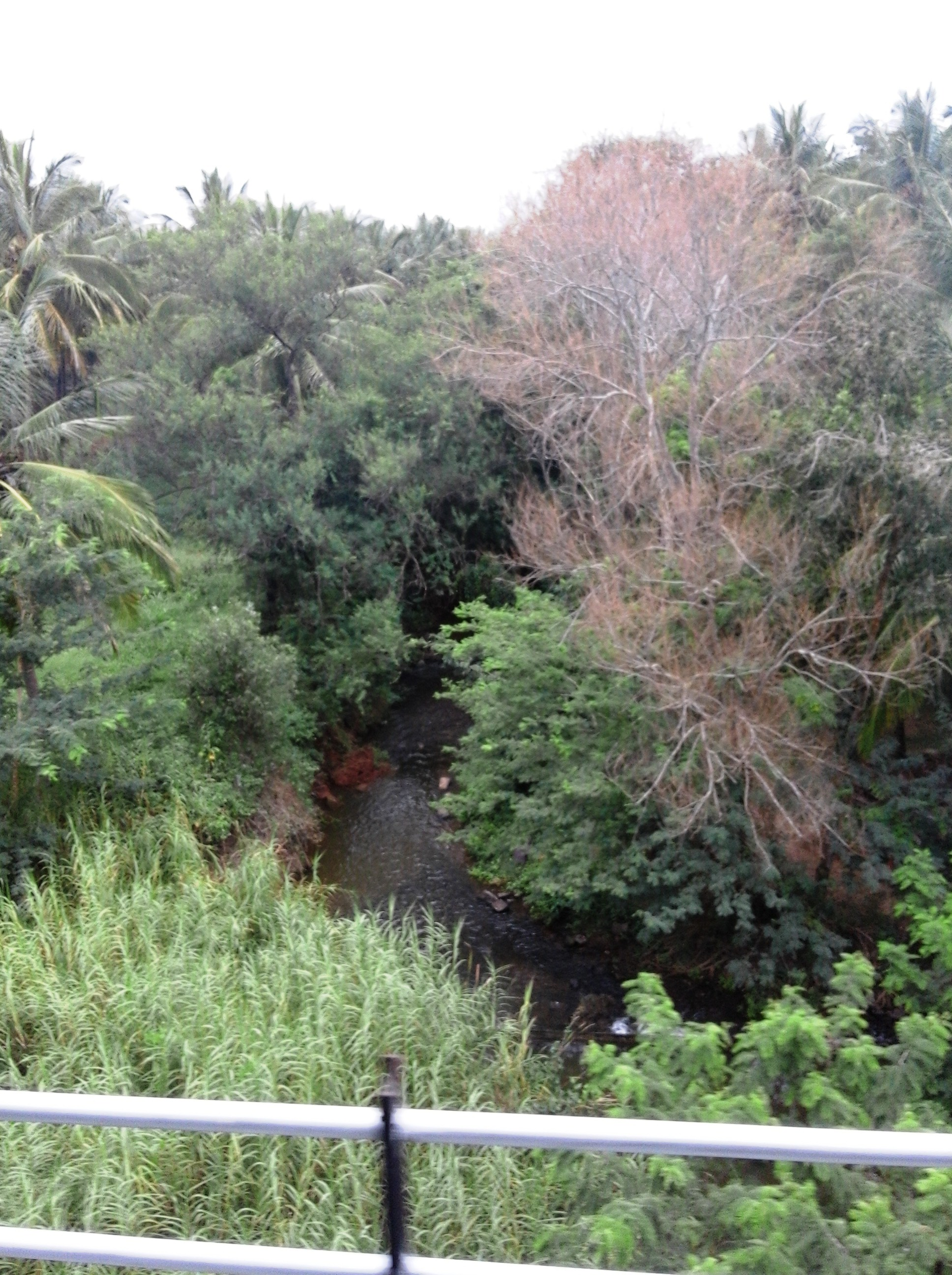
Yenne river, Kadakola

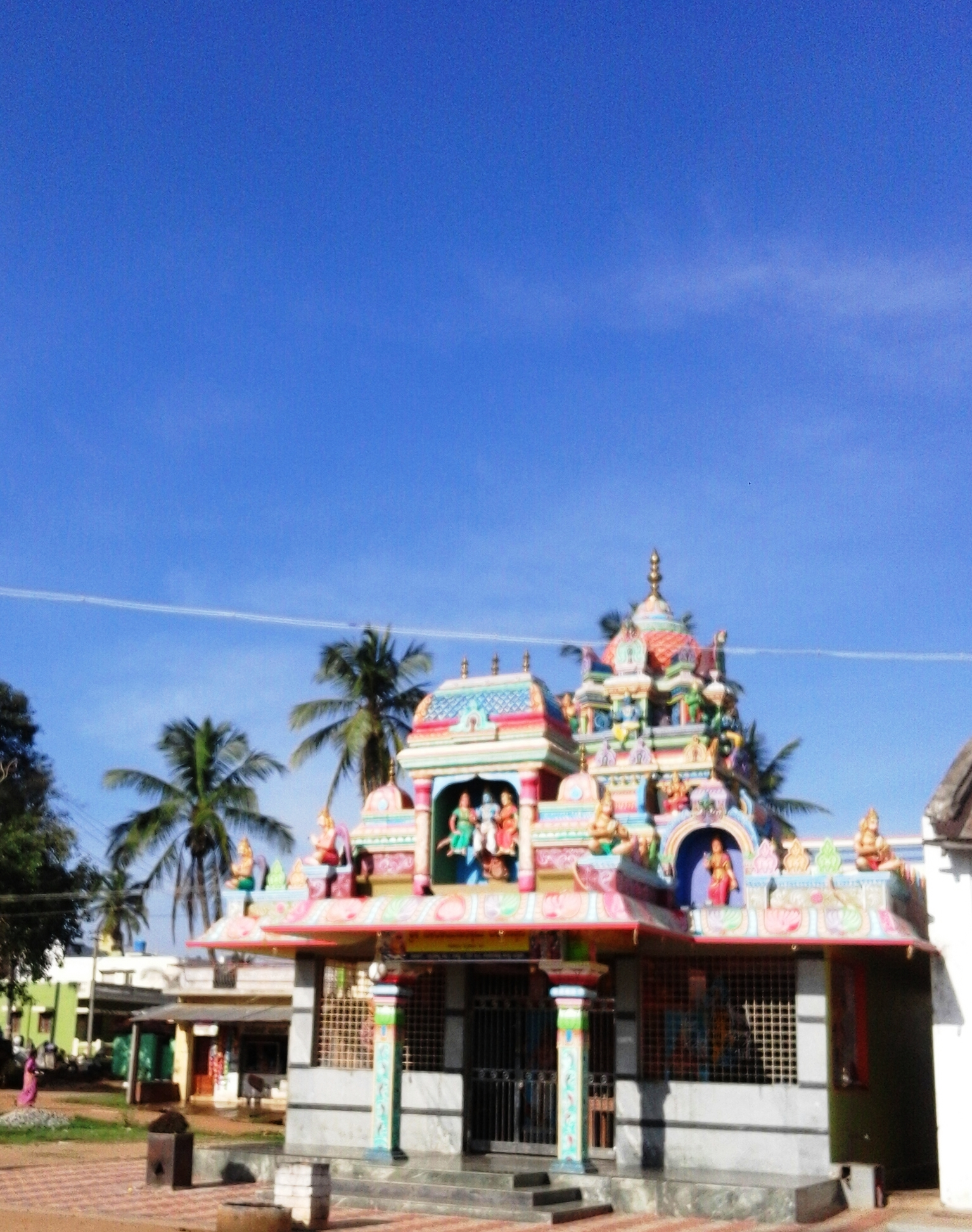
Kadakola temple

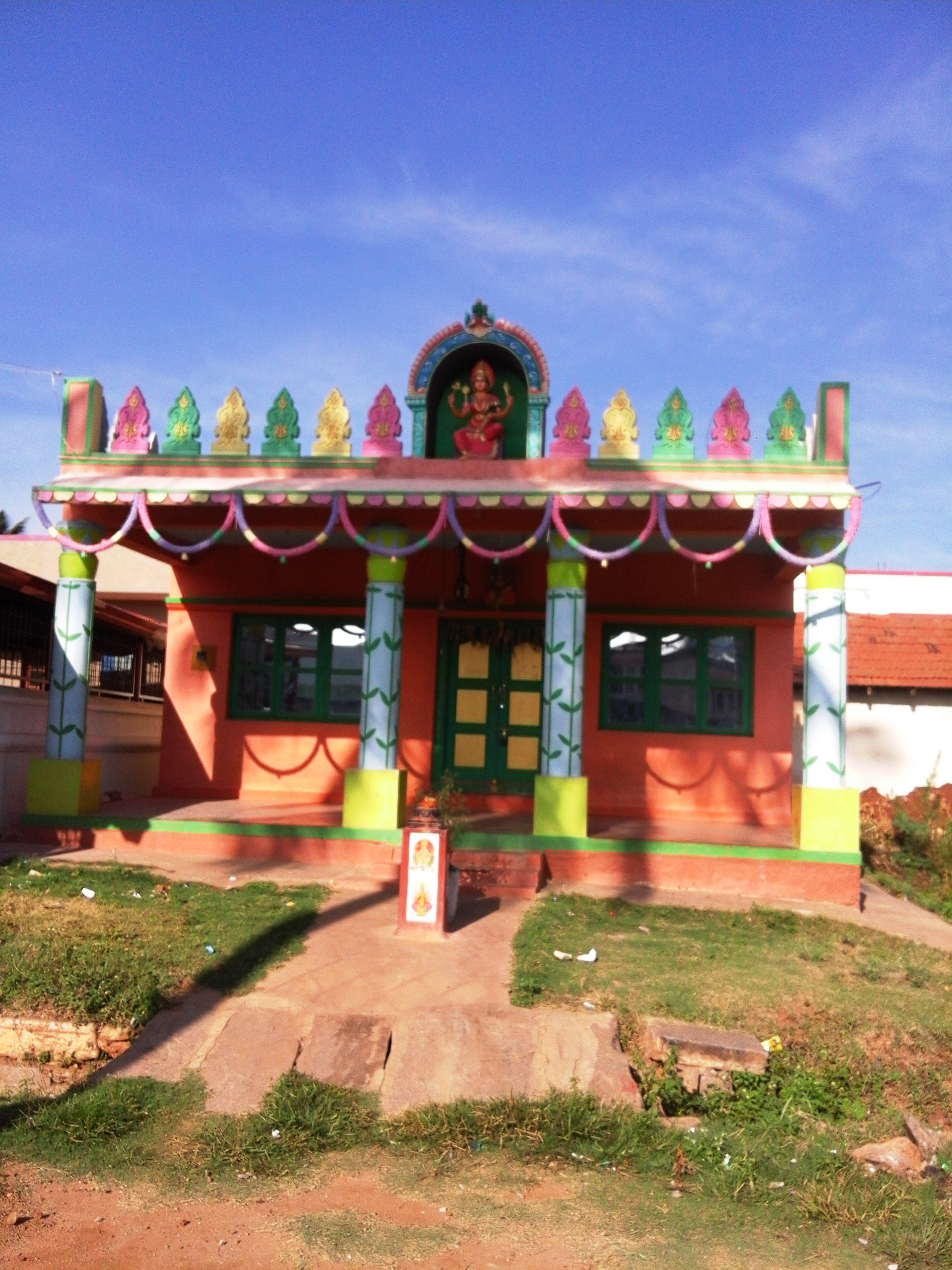
Small Devastahana

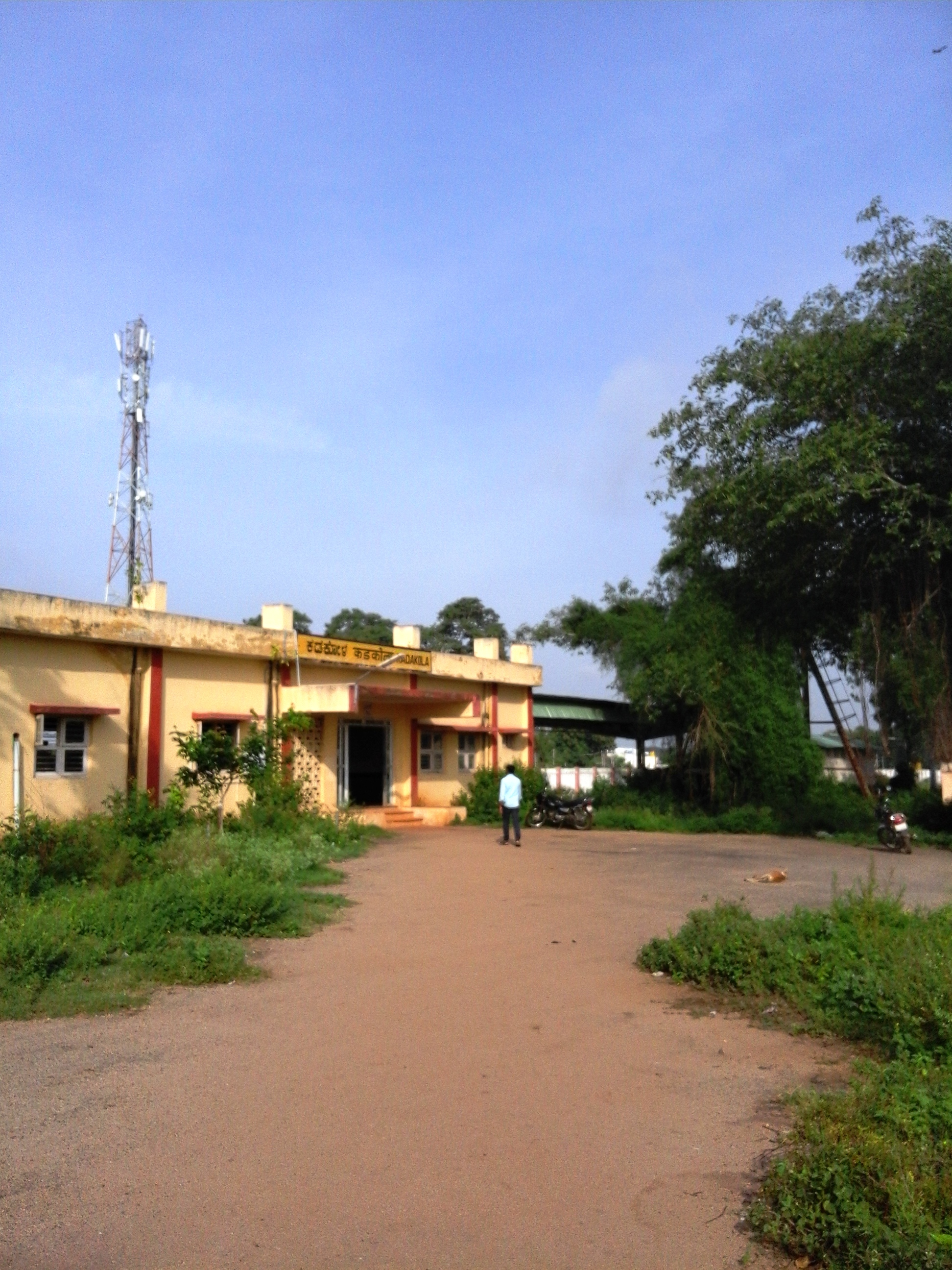
Kadakola Railway Station

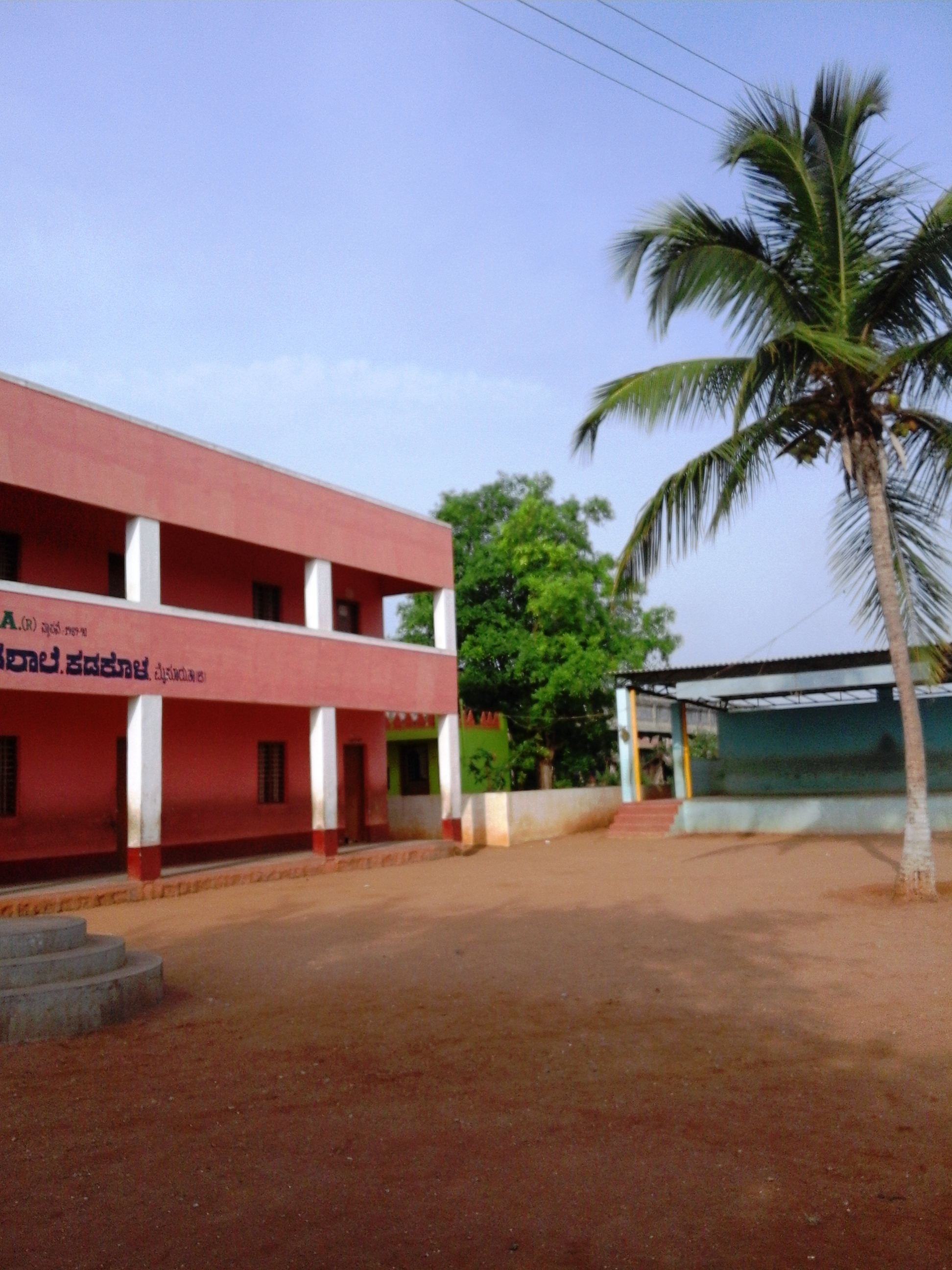

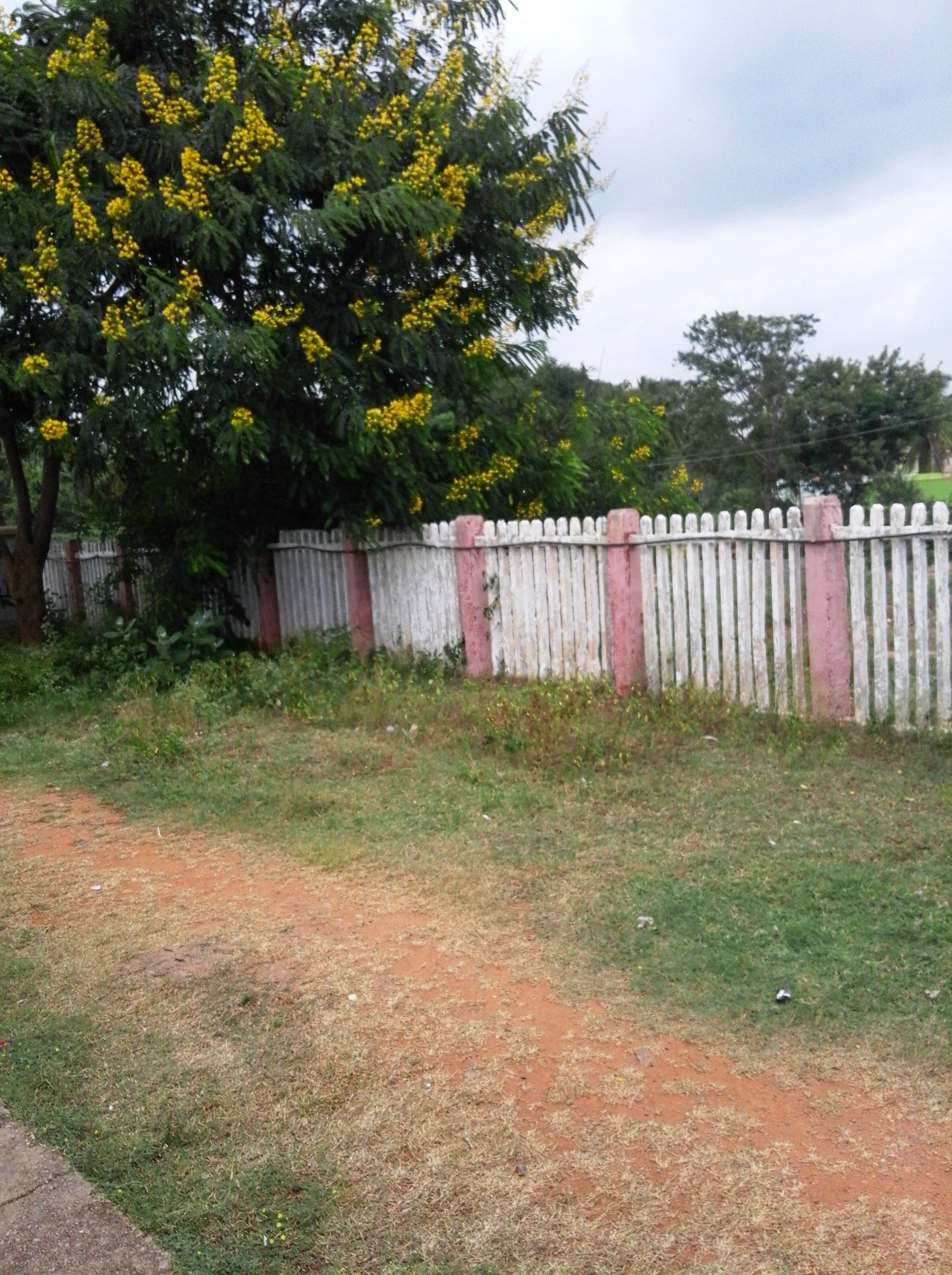

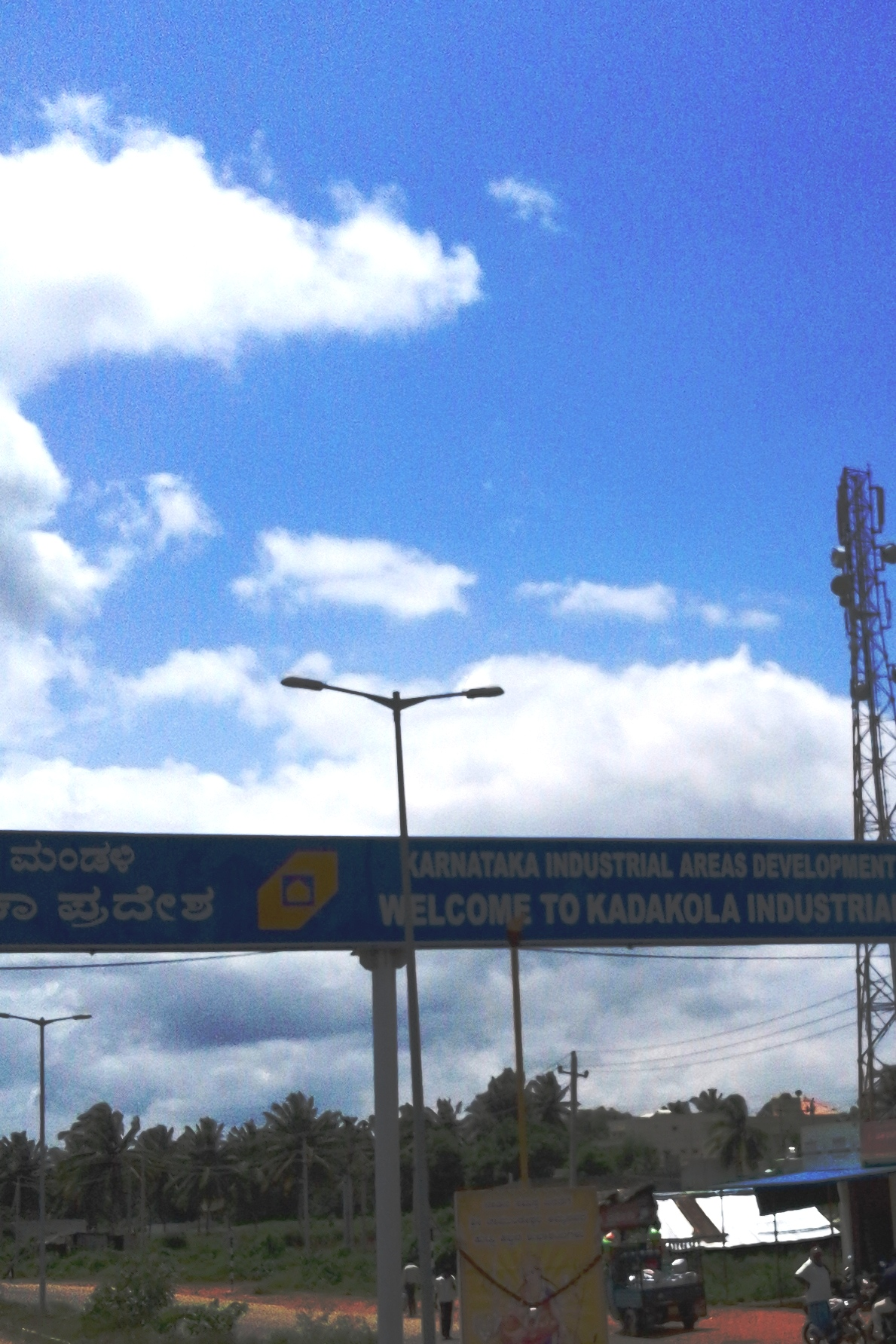

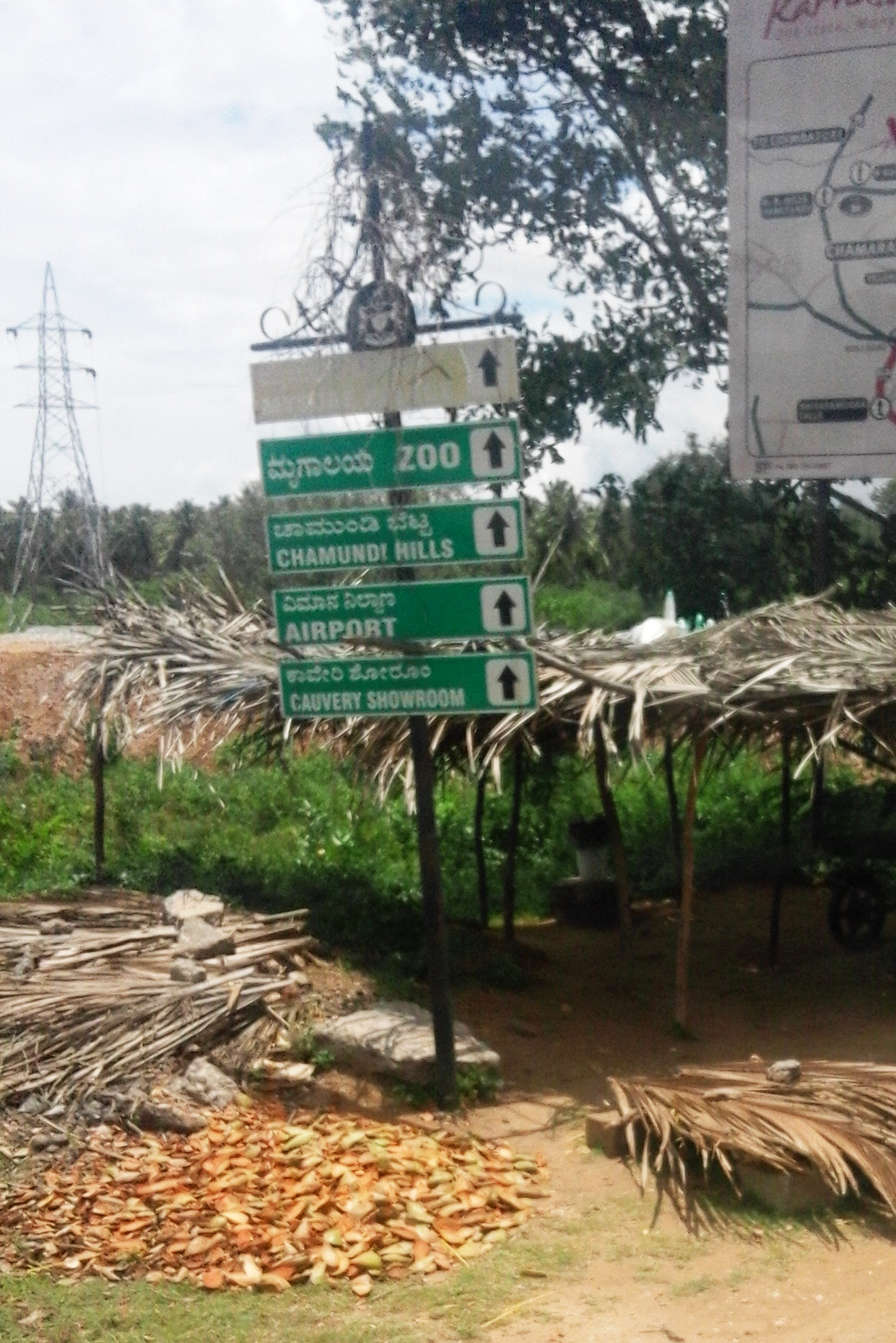

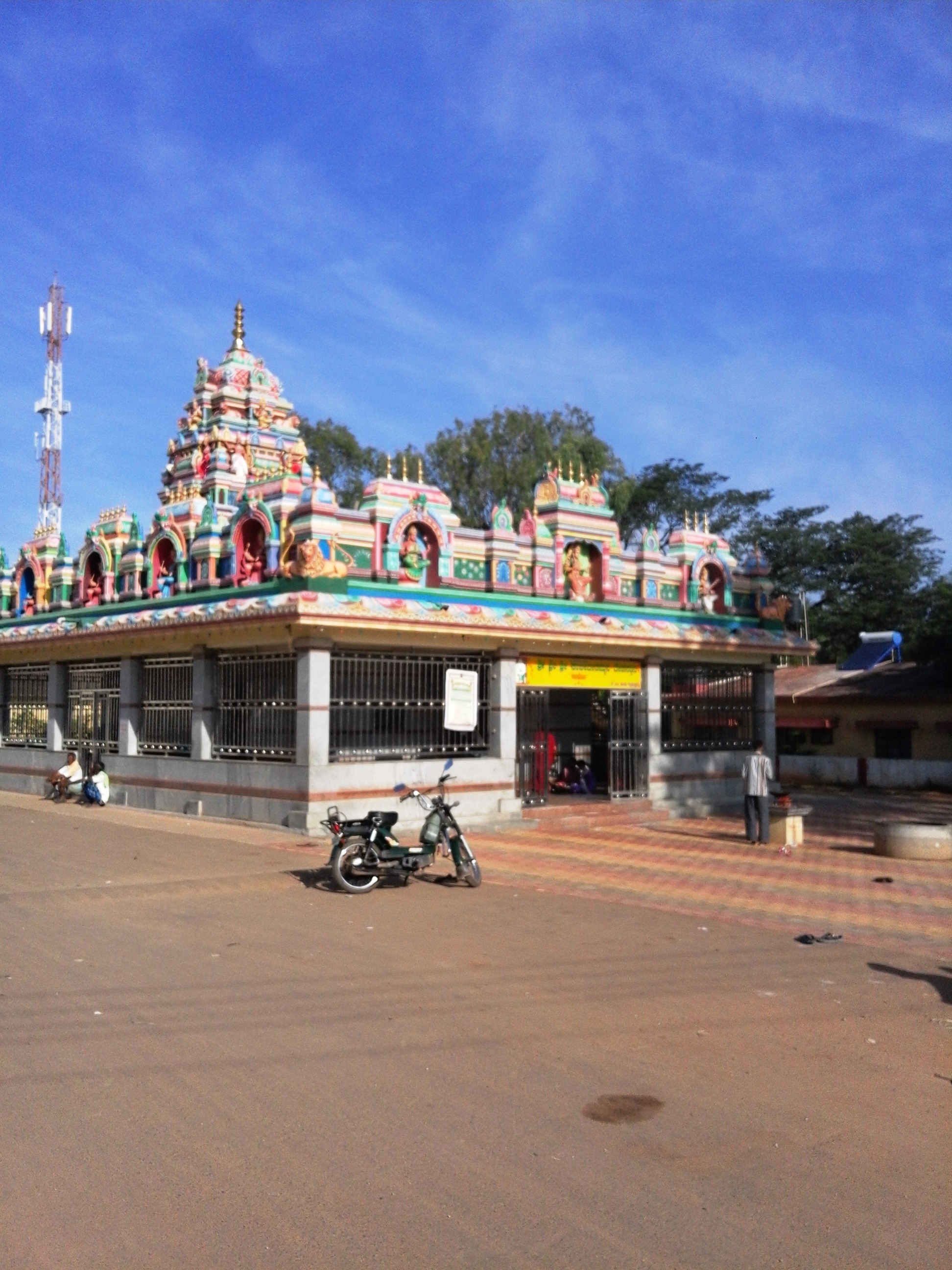

== See also ==
- Mysore
- Nanjangud
- Chamarajanagar
- Mysore–Chamarajanagar branch line
