= Mysuru Local Planning Area =

Mysore Local Planning Area
- Metropolitan Area
- Mysuru-Nanjangud Local Planning Area
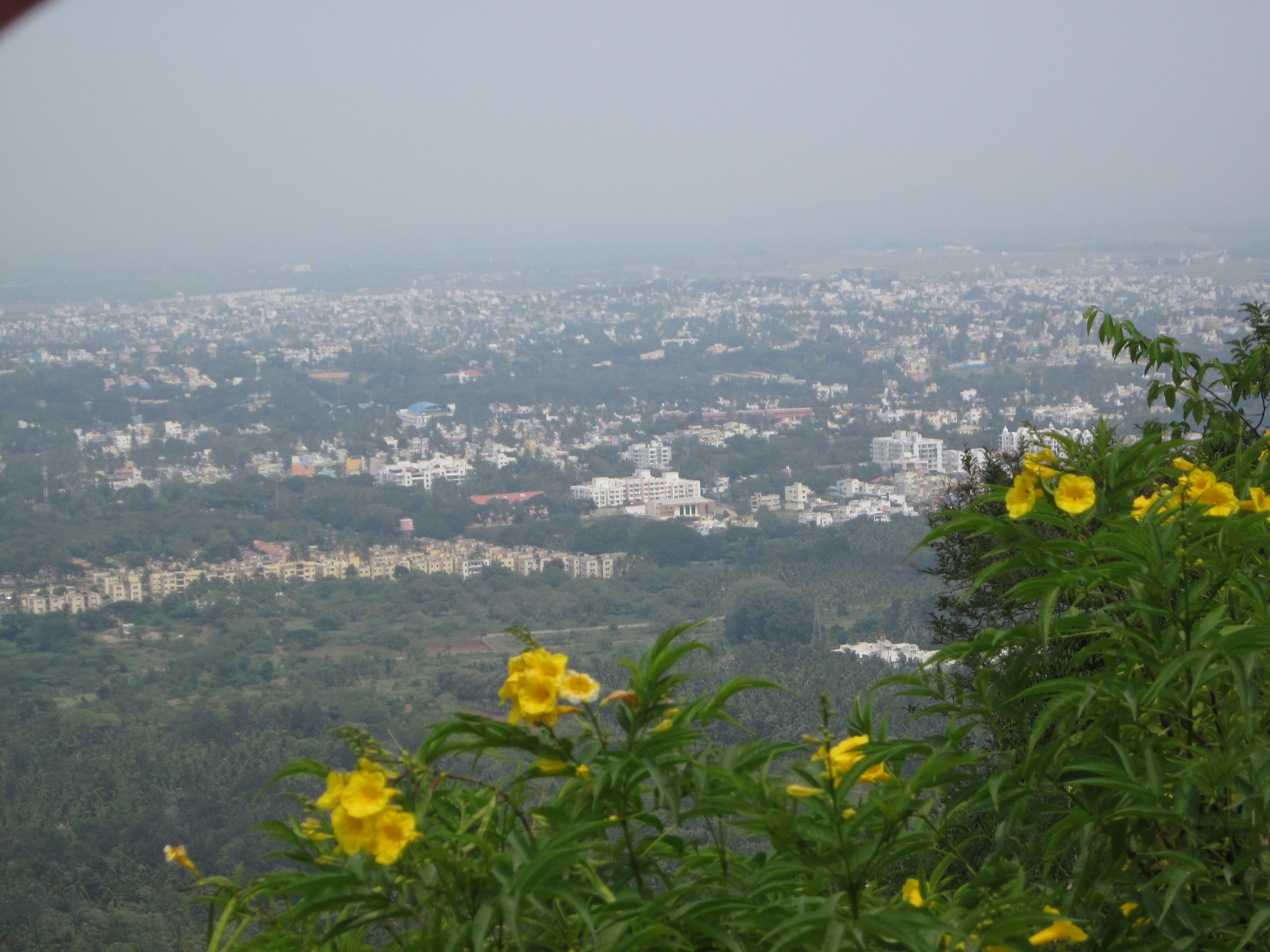
- Mysuru seen from Chamundi Hills
- Country: India
- State: Karnataka
- Division: Mysore division
- District: Mysuru district, Mandya district

Government
  - Type: Urban Development Authority
  - Body: Mysore Urban Development Authority

Area
  - Metropolitan Area: 509 km^{2} (197 sq mi)

Population (2011)
  - Urban: 1,060,120
  - Metro: 1,696,577
- Time zone: UTC+05:30 (IST)
- Website: www.mudamysore.gov.in

Mysuru Local Planning Area is the metropolitan area limit defined in City Development Plan 2031 by Mysore Urban Development Authority. Mysuru Planning Area is divided into 45 planning districts spanning across the Taluks of Mysore, Nanjangud and Srirangapatna of Mandya district. As per City Development Plan 2031, this metropolitan area covers 509sq.km of area and has a population of 1,696,577.

The boundaries of the metropolitan region is described in City Development Plan 2031. The area consists of Mysuru City Corporation area, Nanjangud City Municipal Council, Hootagalli City Municipal Council, Town Panchayats of Bhogadi, Srirampura, Rammanahalli, Kadakola, several villages in Mysuru Taluk, 19 villages in Nanjangud Taluk and 13 villages in Srirangapatna Taluk.

== Administration ==
Urban growth and expansion is managed by the Mysore Urban Development Authority (MUDA), which is headed by a commissioner. Its activities include developing new layouts and roads, town planning and land acquisition. One of the major projects undertaken by MUDA is the creation of an Outer Ring Road to ease traffic congestion. CDP 2031 aims to preserve heritage sites in Mysuru, strengthen economy, balance land use, make city slum free, maintaining and widening of roads and street lighting, develop eco-planning districts with agricultural zones, providing a metro rail system and more. Major proposals in CDP 2031 include decentralization of commercial district, satellite townshipat Jayapura and Yelawala and expansion of airport. CDP 2031 also defines various regulations for different types of buildings and structures for residential, commercial, industrial and other uses.

The local planning area can be divided into 4 parts:

1. Mysuru Urban Agglomeration area consisting of Mysuru City Corporation, Hootagalli City Municipal Council, Bhogadi Town Panchayat, Srirampura Town Panchayat, Rammanahalli Town Panchayat, Kadakola Town Panchayat and Outgrowths.
2. Nanjangud Area made up City Municipal Council of Nanjangud and surrounding villages
3. KRS Area made up of villages in Shrirangapatna taluk surrounding Mysuru Urban Agglomeration
4. Mysuru Rural Area made up of villages in Mysuru Taluk

The area is divided into 45 planning districts.

== Demographics ==
As per CDP 2031, the local planning area has a population of 1,696,577 as per 2011 census. Mysuru UA has population of 1,060,120 as per 2011 census. Nanjangud had population of 50598 as of 2011 census. Projected population of KRS Area of Srirangapatna Taluk is 16,593, Rural area in LPA is 188,444.

== Economy ==
Major industrial areas are Thandavapura, Nanjangud Industrial Areas in Nanjangud Taluk as well as Hebbal, Belavadi, Hootgalli, Koorgalli, Belagola and Metagally Industrial Areas of Mysuru Taluk. Important industries include Bharat Earth Movers Limited, Kirloskar, Vikrant, Tyres, Jay Bearings, Automotive Axles, AT&S, Nestle, granite cutting industries, Reid and Taylor, cement building blocks and TVS. The area is also home to IT companies such as Infosys, Wipro, L&T, SPI, etc. Mysore has traditionally been home to industries such as weaving, sandalwood carving, bronze work and the production of lime and salt. Nanjangud Industrial area also boasts being 2nd highest VAT / Sales Taxpayer which is more than ₹4 billion (US$42 million) after Peenya which is in state capital Bangalore. JK Tyre has its manufacturing facility in Mysore. The major software companies in Mysore are Infosys, ArisGlobal, Larsen & Toubro Infotech, Excelsoft Technologies and Triveni Engineering. The growth of the information technology industry in the first decade of the 21st century has resulted in the city emerging as the second largest software exporter in Karnataka (as of), next to Bangalore. Mysore also hosts many central government organizations like CFTRI, DFRL, CIPET, BEML, RMP (Rare Material Project), RBI Note printing Press and RBI Paper Printing Press.
