= Rammanahalli =

- Town
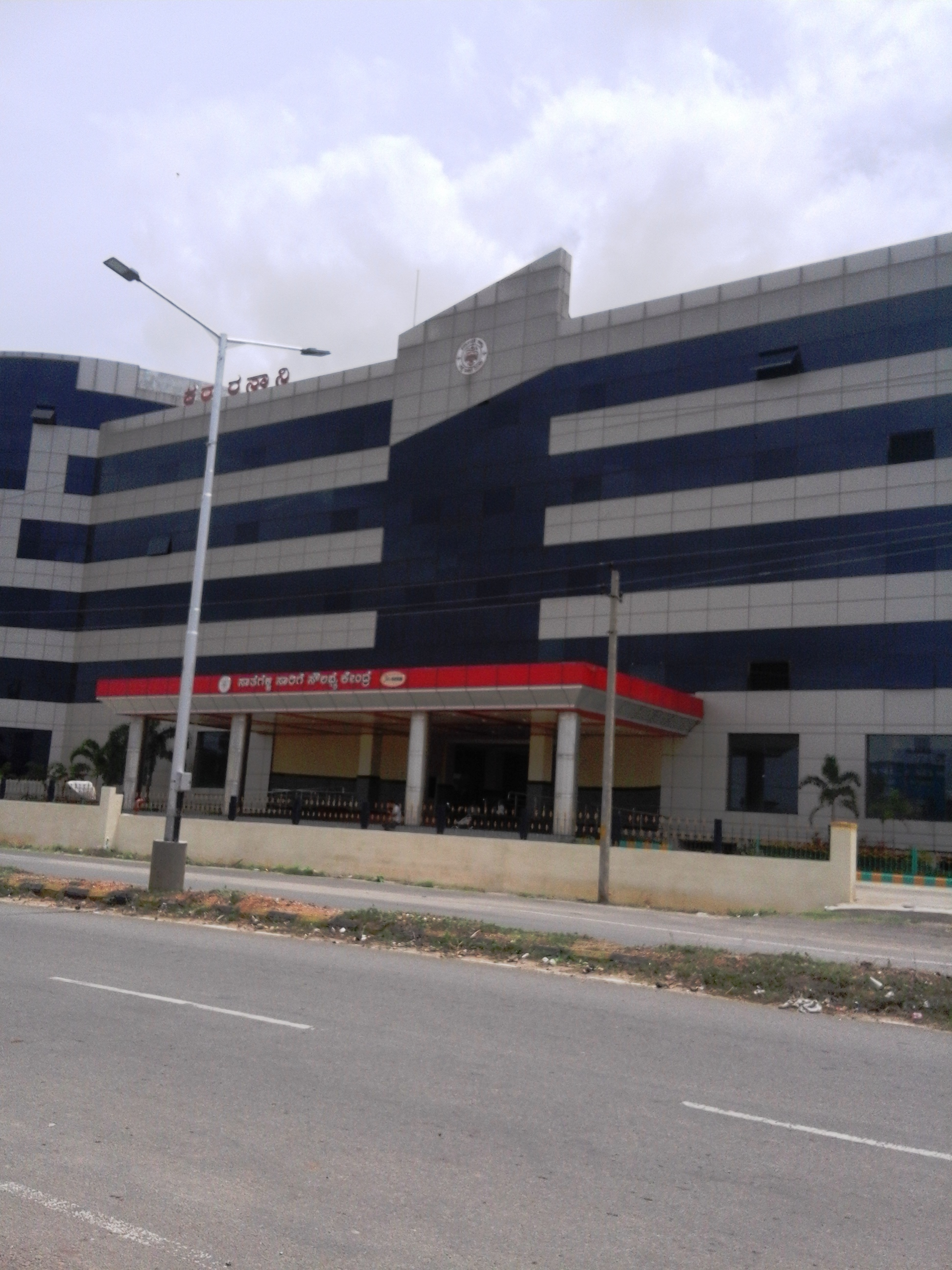
- Sathgalli KSRTC Bus Station
- Interactive map of Rammanahalli
- Coordinates: 12°11′32″N 76°39′55″E
- Country: India
- State: Karnataka
- District: Mysore
- Talukas: Mysore

Government
  - Body: Town Panchayat

Area
  - Total: 22.81 km^{2} (8.81 sq mi)

Population (2011)
  - Total: 20,804
  - Density: 912.1/km^{2} (2,362/sq mi)

Languages
  - Official: Kannada
- Time zone: UTC+5:30 (IST)
- ISO 3166 code: IN-KA
- Vehicle registration: KA
- Nearest city: Mysore

Rammanahalli (Kannada: ರಮ್ಮನಹಳ್ಳಿ, pronounced [ramman̪aħaɭɭi] in Kannada)is a suburb of Mysuru in Karnataka which is a state of India. It is located in the Mysore taluk of Mysore district. In November 2020, Rammanahalli was upgraded from a Gram Panchayat to a Nagar Panchayat after a gazetted notification was passed on November 26, 2020. The combined population of the town according to 2011 census was 20,804.

== Demographics ==
According to census 2011, combined population of the town according to 2011 census was 20,804. Population breakdown is given below.

| Area Name | Population According to Census 2011 |
|---|---|
| Rammanahalli | 9584 |
| Nadanahalli | 2808 |
| Alanahalli | 6779 |
| Hanchya | 4743 |
| Sathgalli | 819 |

== Localities ==
- Rammanahalli
- Sathgalli
- Nadanahalli
- Hanchya
- Alanahalli
- KBL Layout
- Nandini Layout
- Buguthagalli

== Landmarks ==
- Sathgalli Bus Station
- VTU Regional Center
- Vidya Vikas Engineering College
- Jalmahal Resort
- Jnanasarovara International School
- Alanahalli Police Station
- Sathgalli Police Station
- St.Arnold's Central School

== Gallery ==
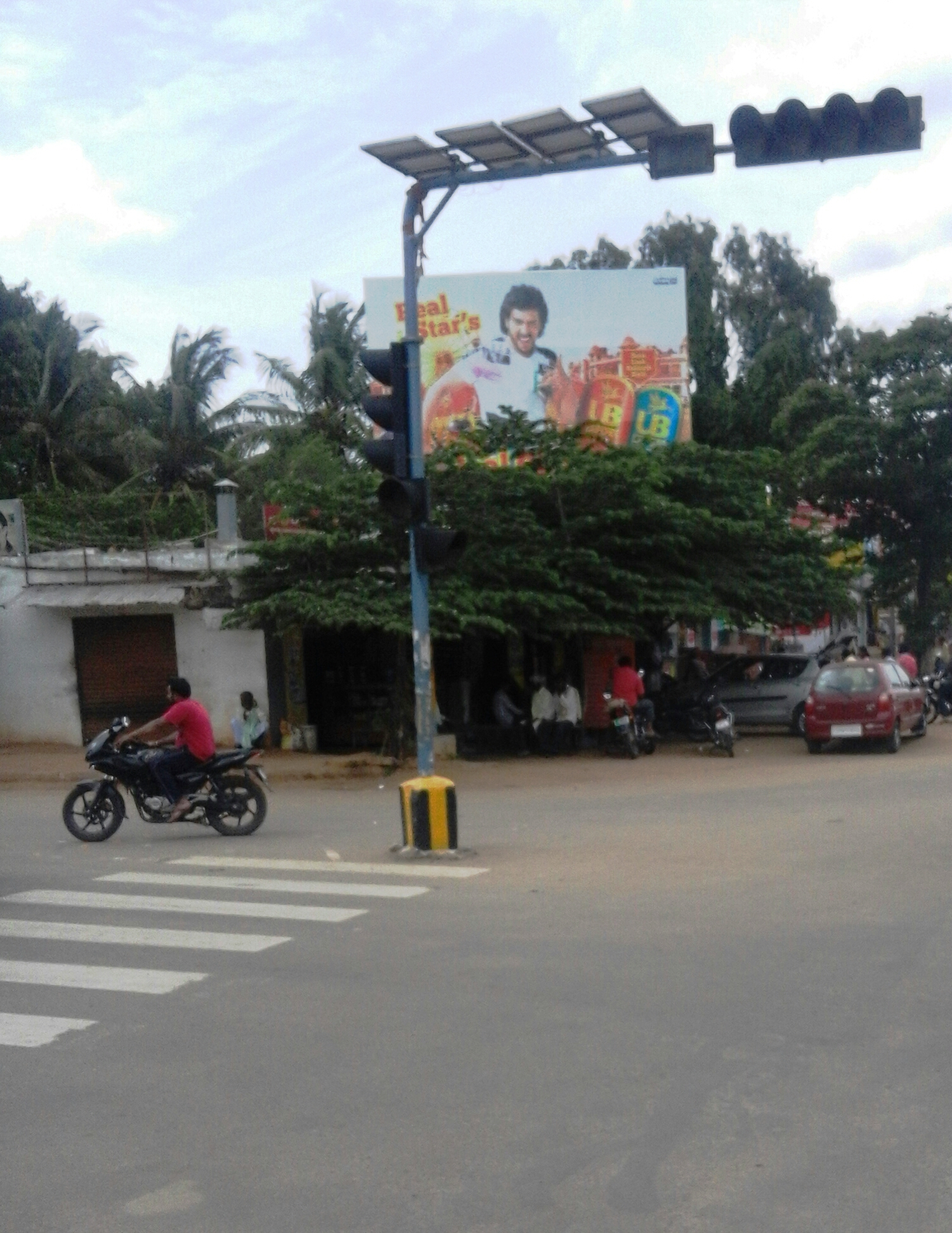

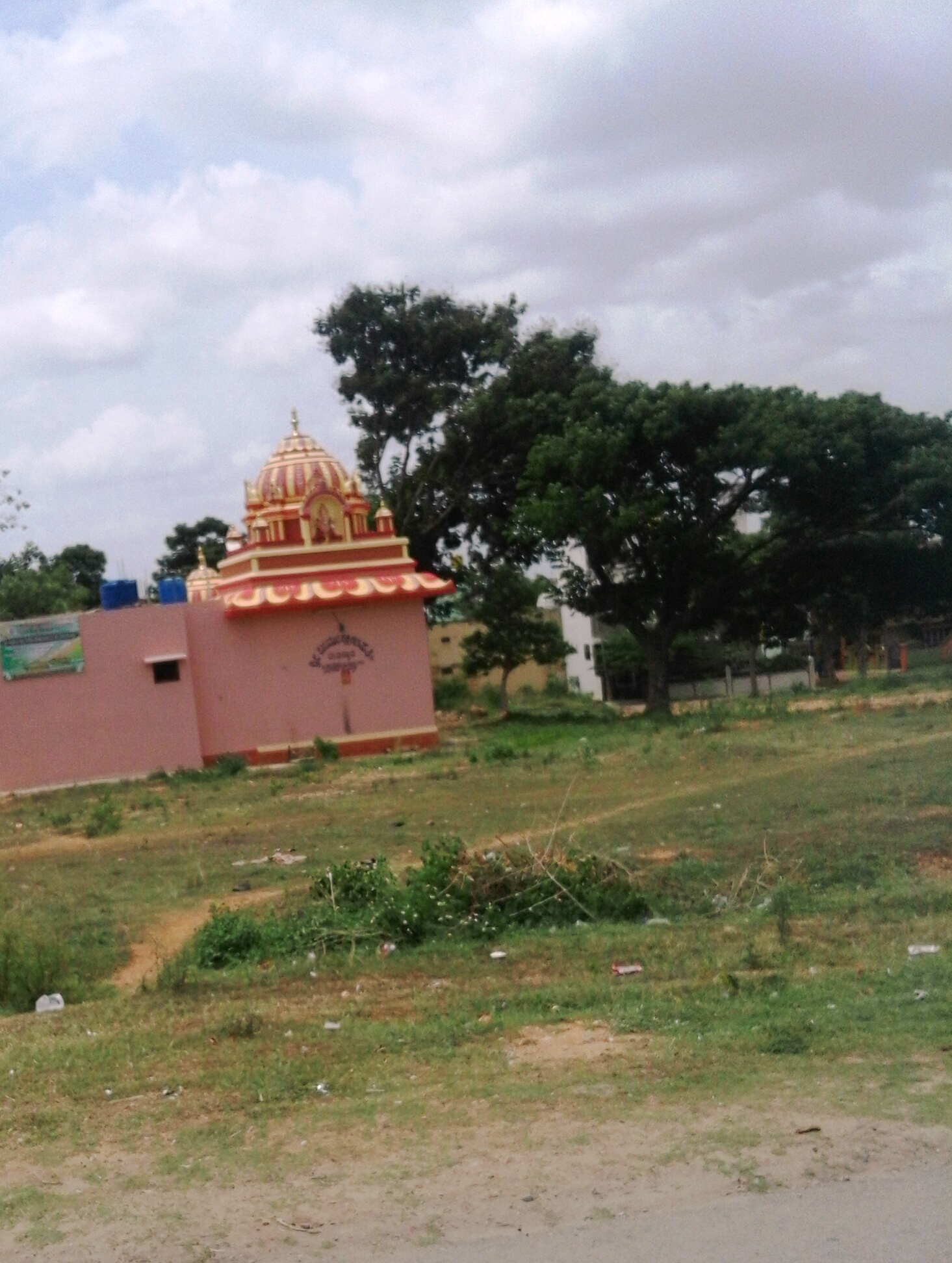

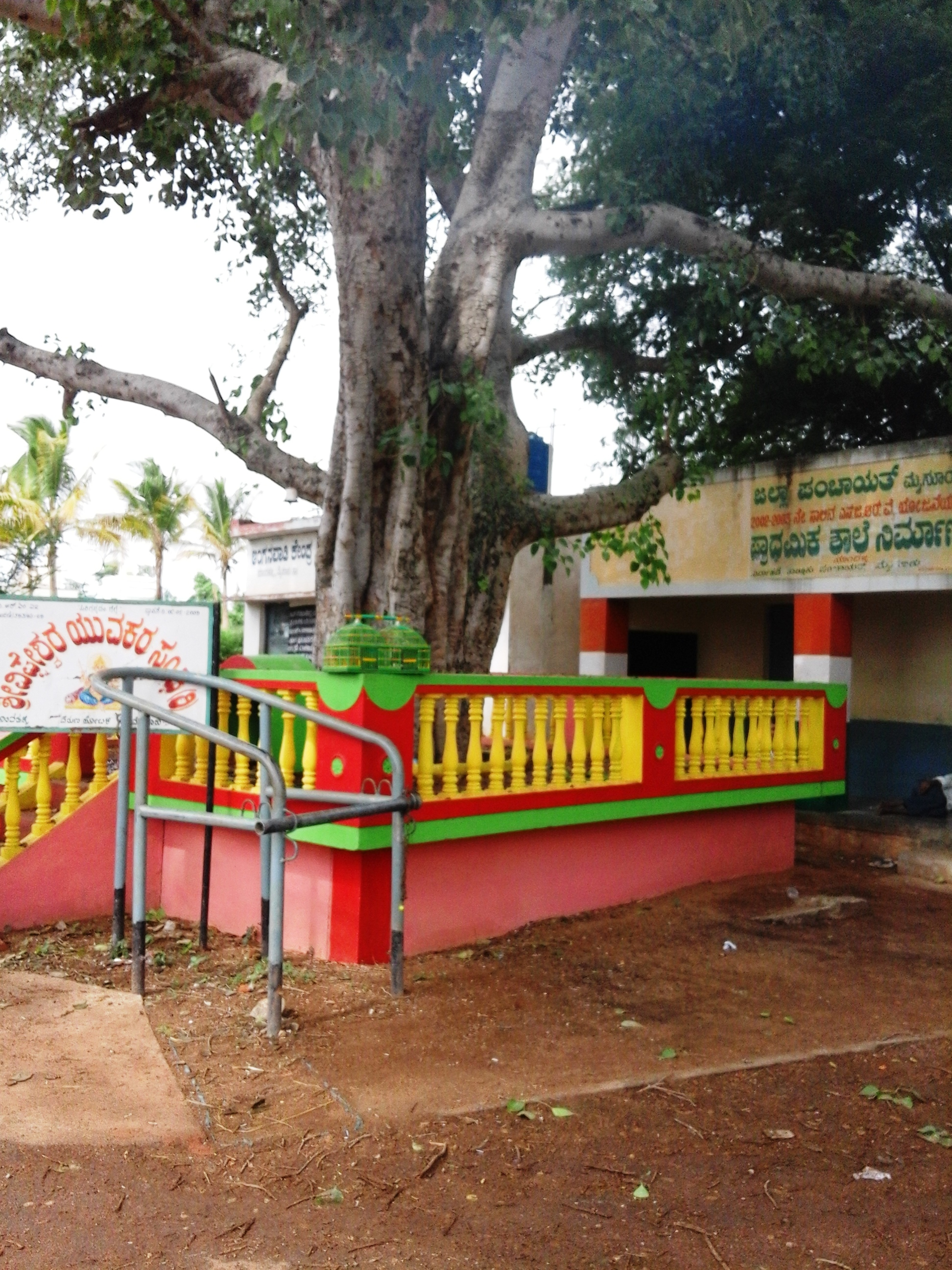

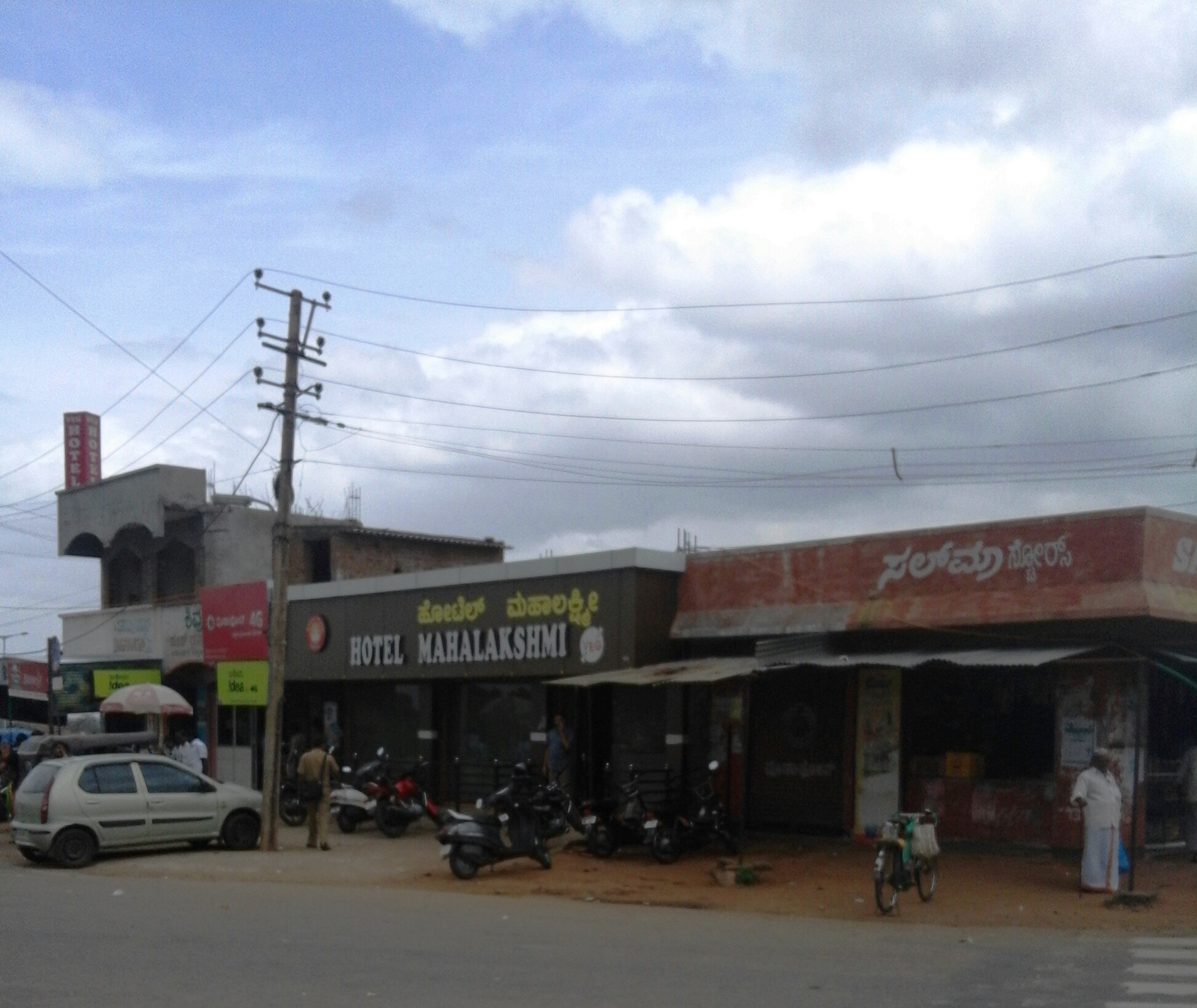

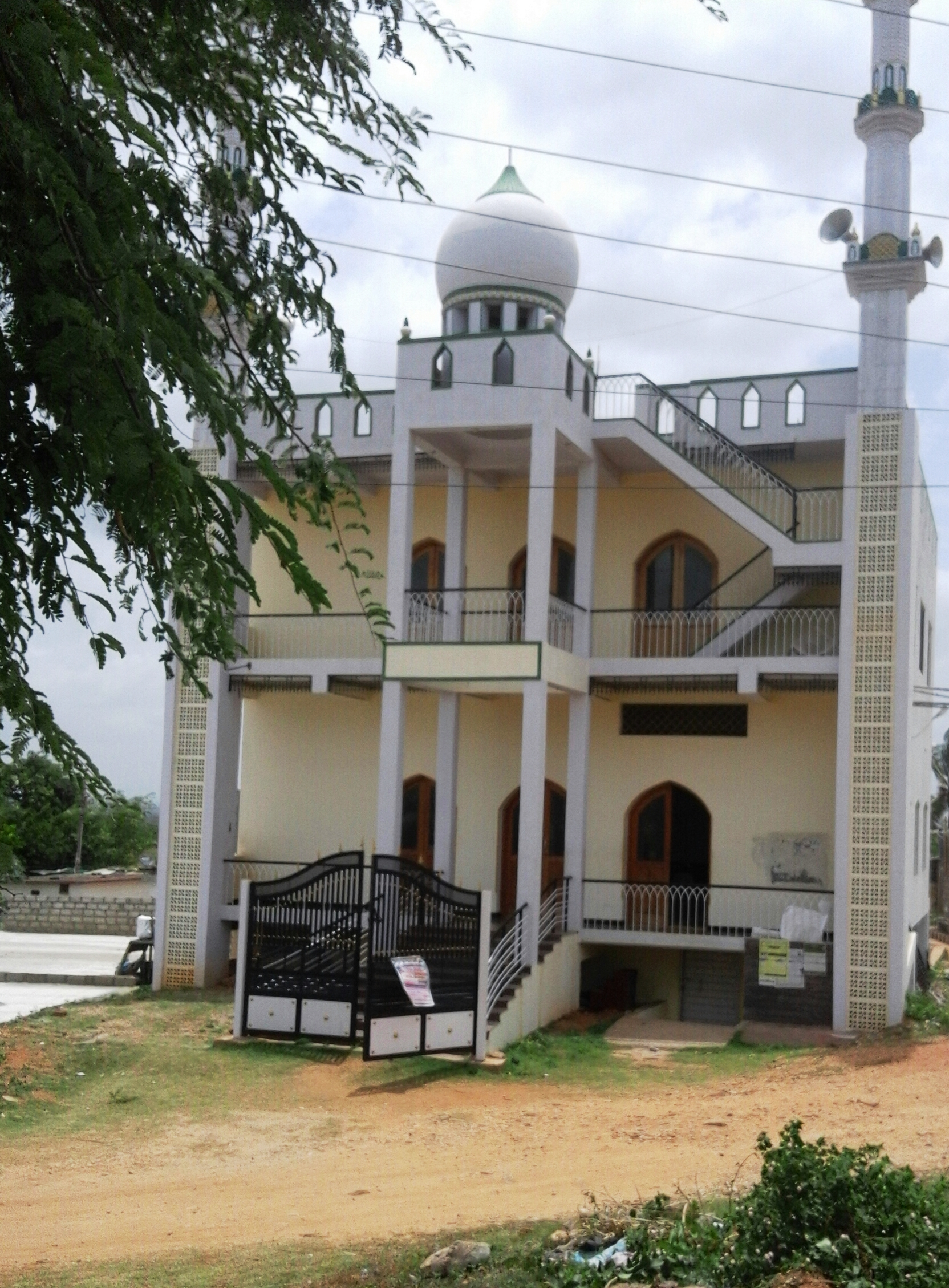

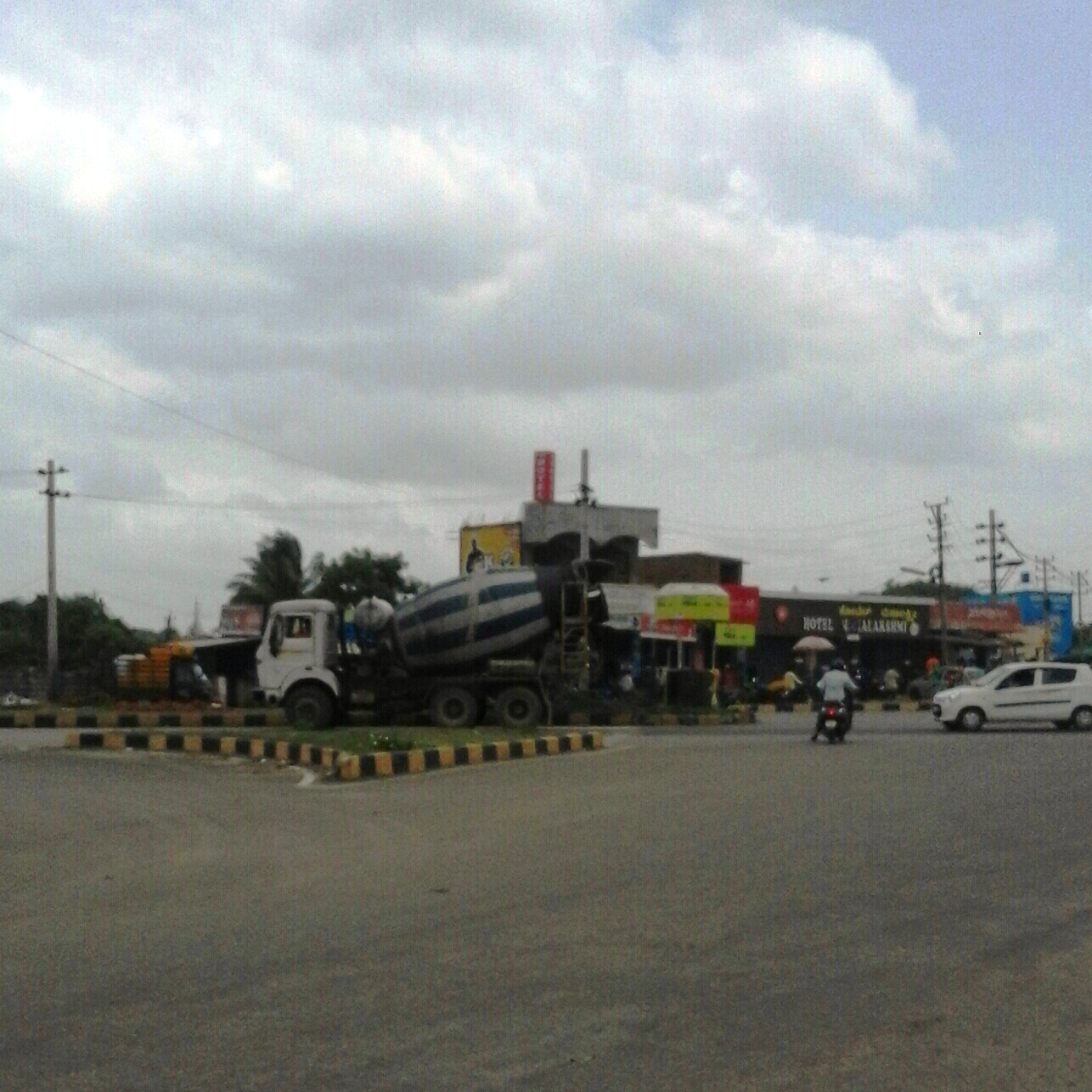

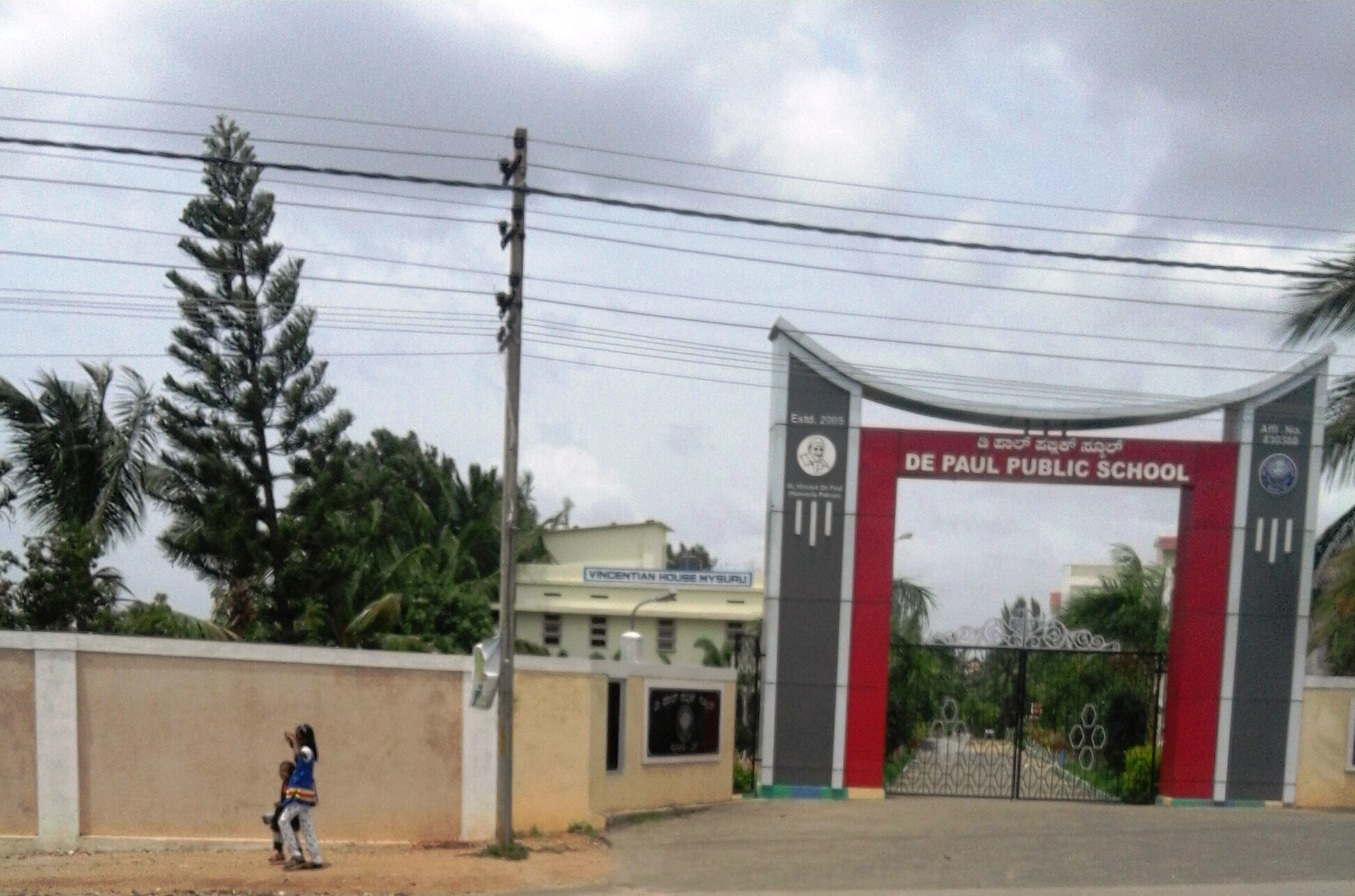

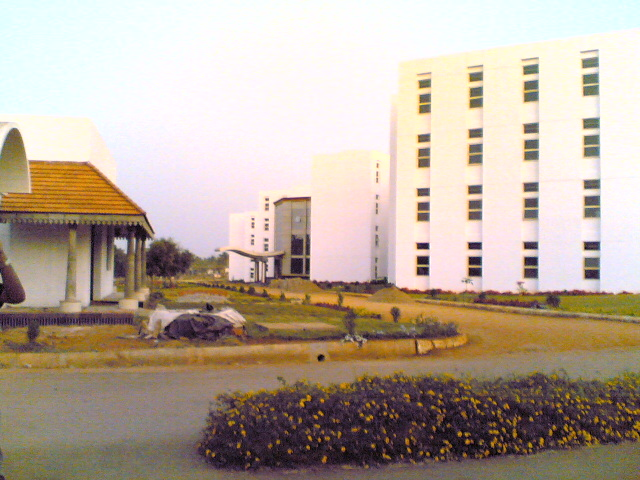

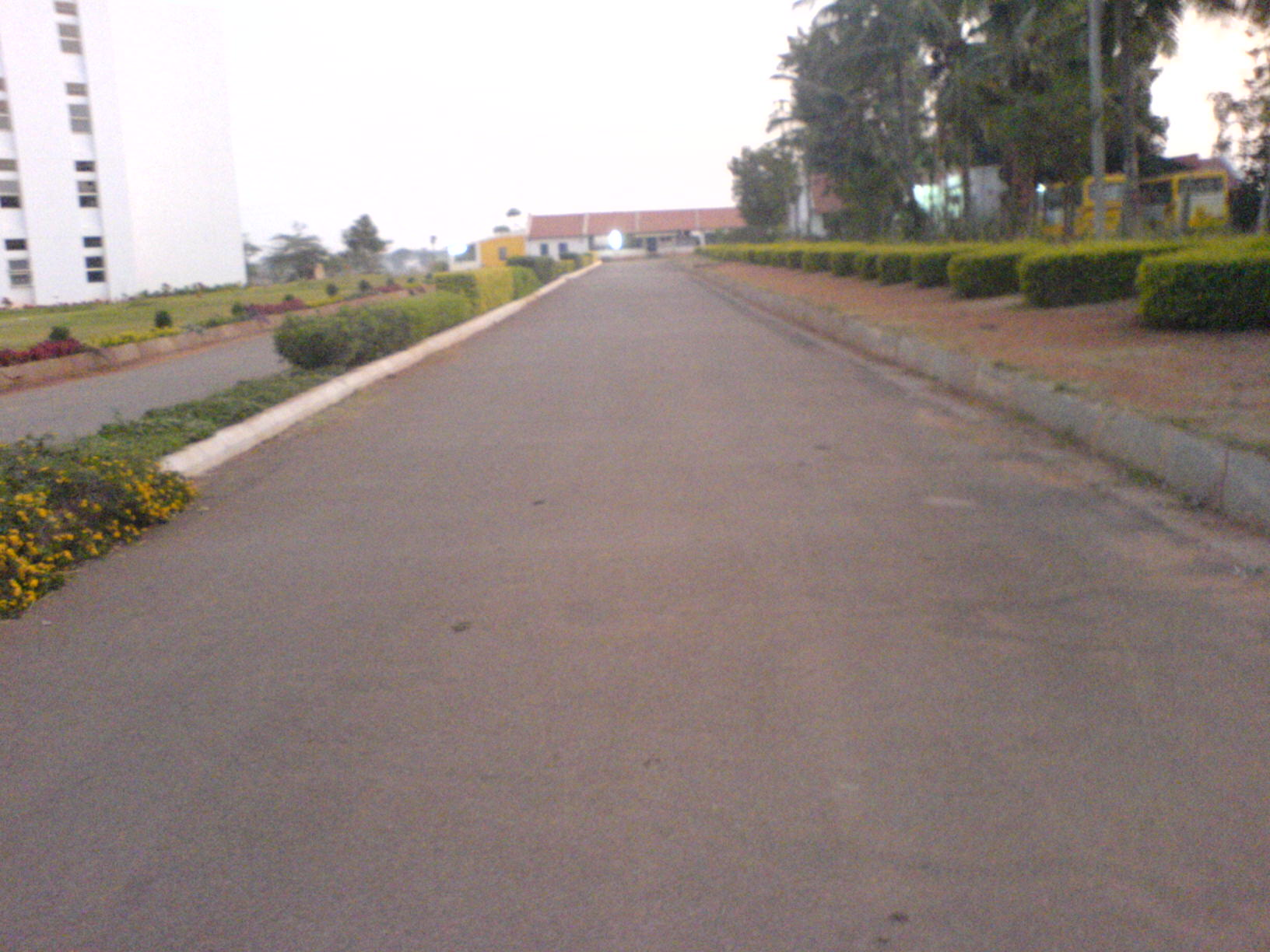

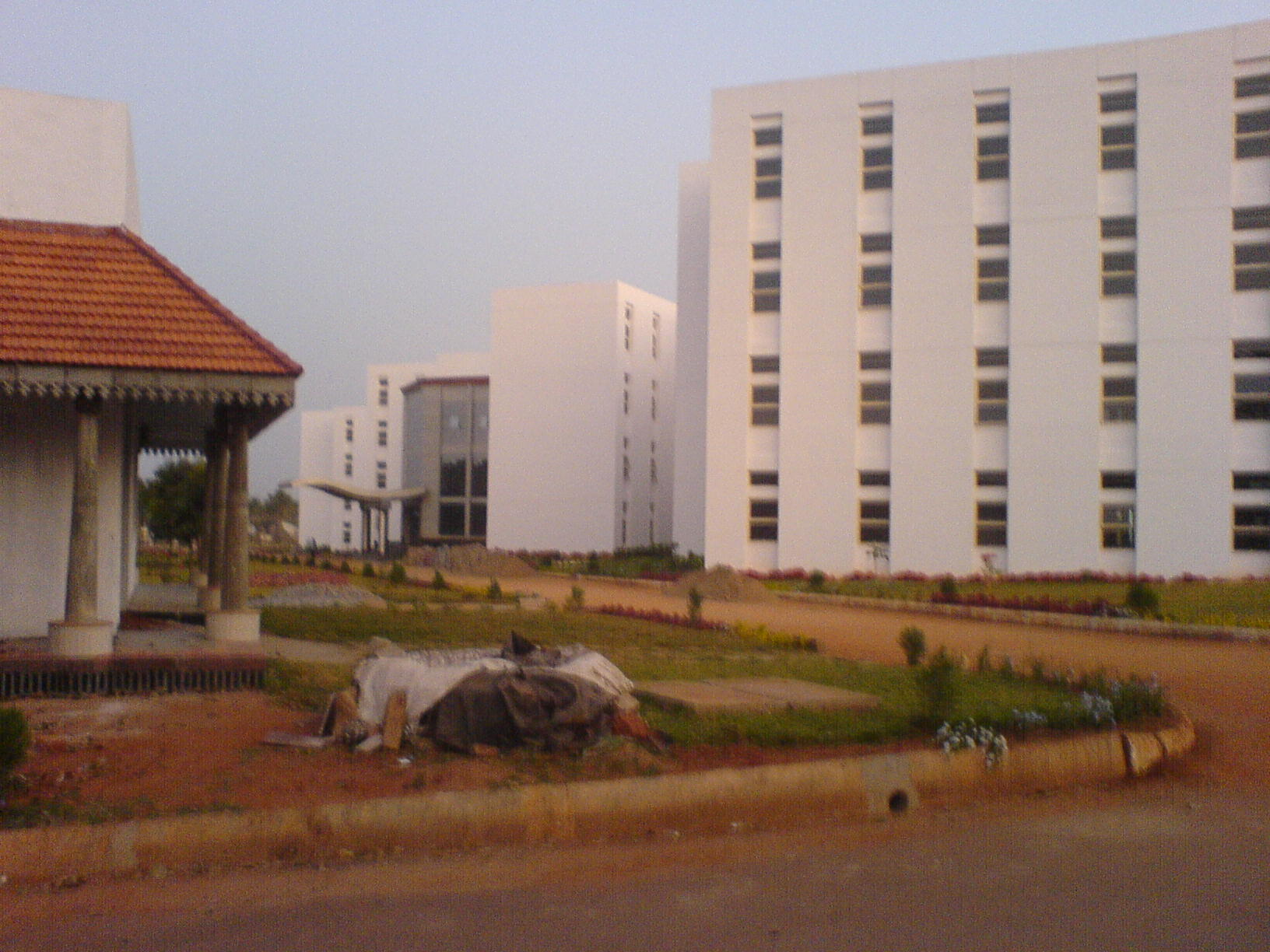

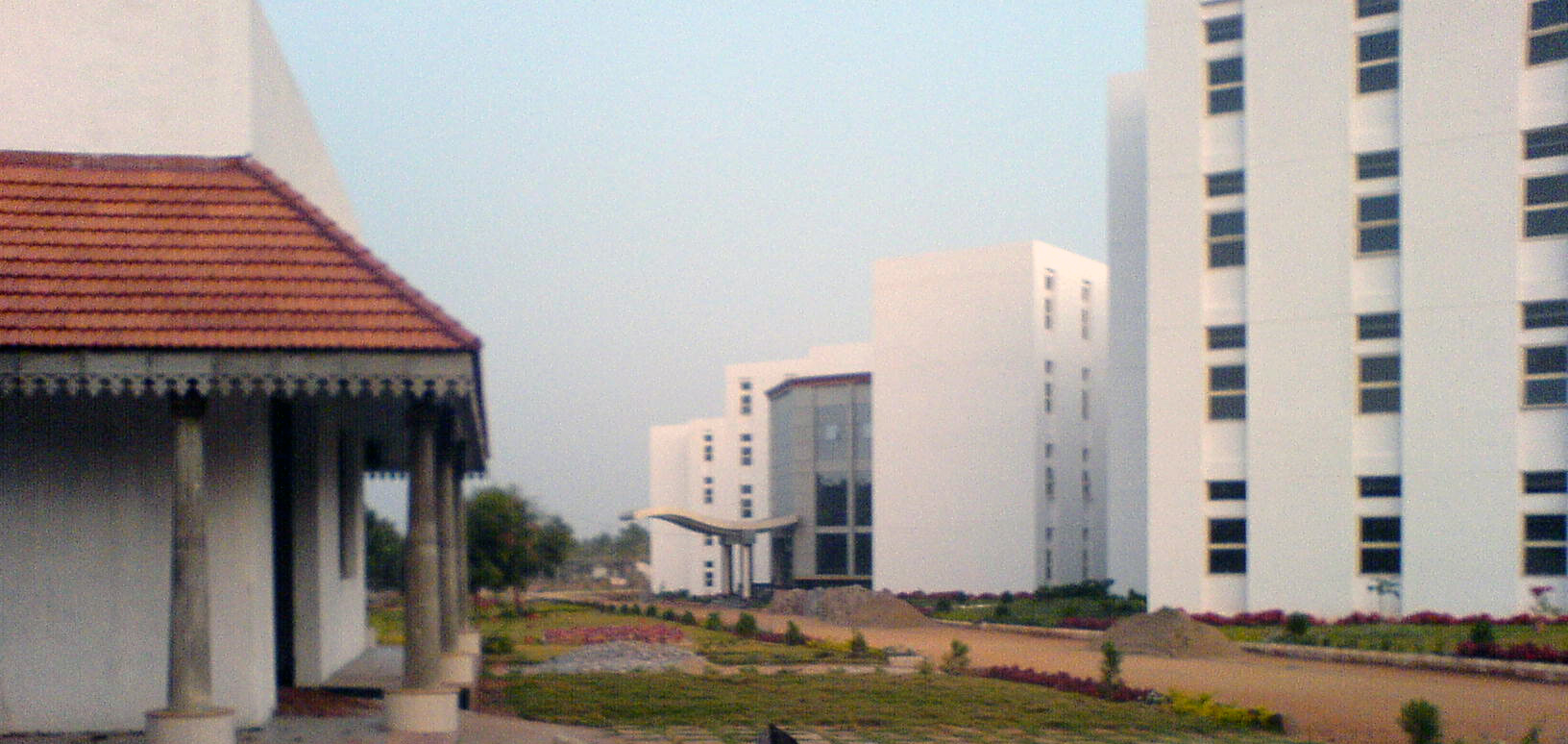

== See also ==
- Districts of Karnataka
