= KRS Nisarga Badavane =

Housing project in Karnataka, India

- ಕೆ.ಆರ್.ಎಸ್ ನಿಸರ್ಗ ಬಡಾವಣೆ
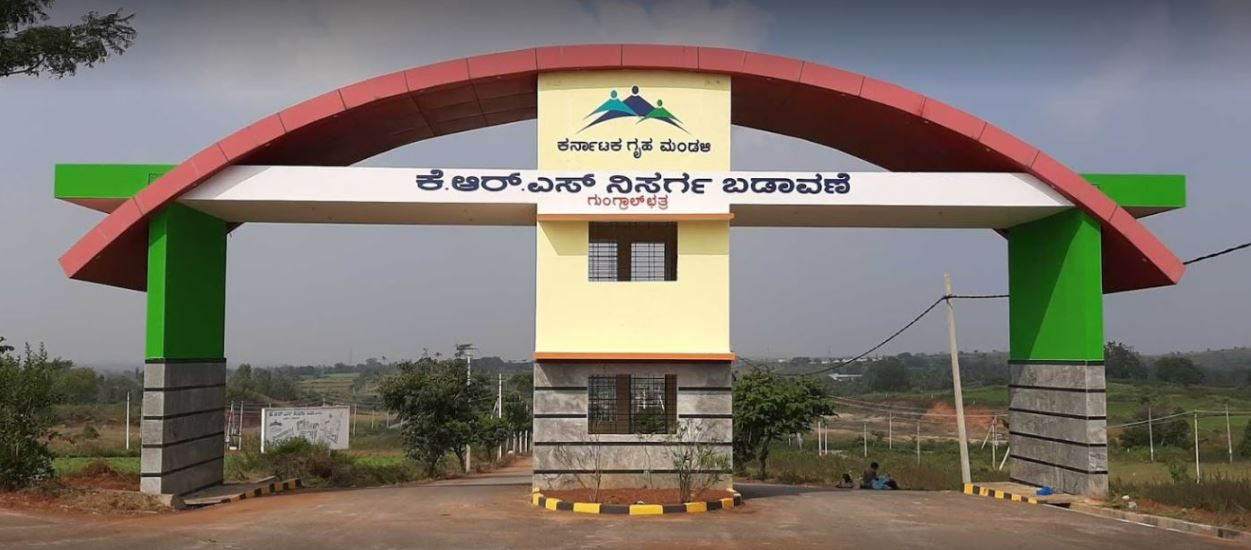
- Entrance of KRS Nisarga Badavane

- Location within Karnataka Location within India
- Country: India
- State: Karnataka
- District: Mysuru

Languages
  - Official Language: Kannada
- Time zone: UTC+5:30 (IST)
- Pincode: 571130
- Vehicle registration: KA-09
- Lok Sabha: Mysuru
- Vidhan Sabha: Chamundeshwari

KRS Nisarga Township (ಕೆ.ಆರ್.ಎಸ್ ನಿಸರ್ಗ ಬಡಾವಣೆ) is a mega housing project by Karnataka Housing Board formed in northwestern Mysuru. KRS Nisagra was named as it is right next to the Krishna Raja Sagara - KRS dam location. The layout has 6,309 sites, 207 houses, 18 civic amenity site, 12 commercial complexes and 54 parks.

== Geography ==
The layout is formed of three villages Gungralchatra, Yelachahalli and Kallurunaganahalli Kaval of Ilawala hobli, layout has three blocks (1st Block, 2nd Block and 3rd Block). KHB has developed KRS Nisarga Badavane on 489 acres of land by spending Rs. 686.02 crore.

The Layout will be developed with bus depot, police station, hospital, drinking water facility and all other civic amenities. The Housing Department will provide Rs.7.5 crore and MUDA will provide Rs.7.5 crore for infrastructure development.

== Transport ==
=== Highway ===
Mysuru-Madikeri Economic Corridor Expressway, New National Highway 275 Bengaluru-Mysuru-Madikeri is passing in front of KRS Nisarga Badavane.

== Gallery ==
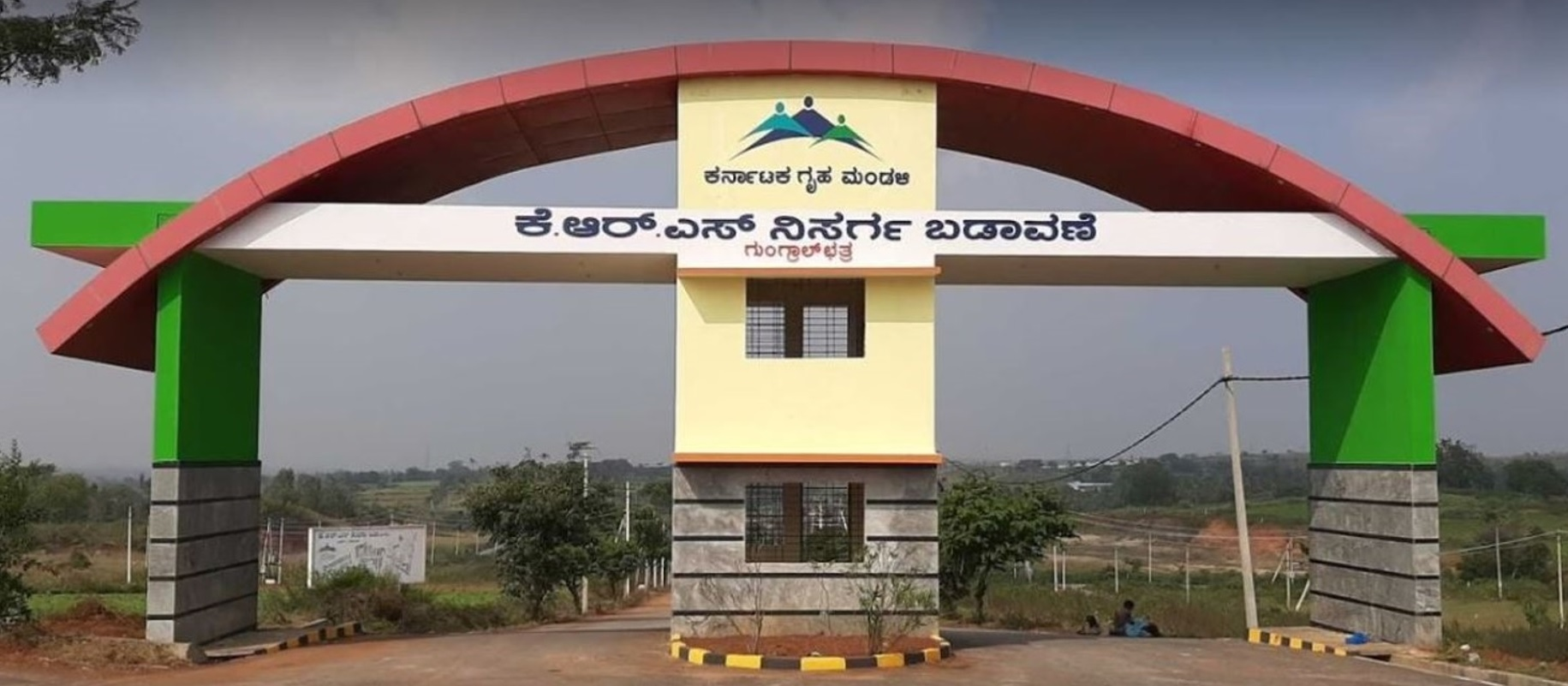
KRS Nisarga Badavane - Entrance I

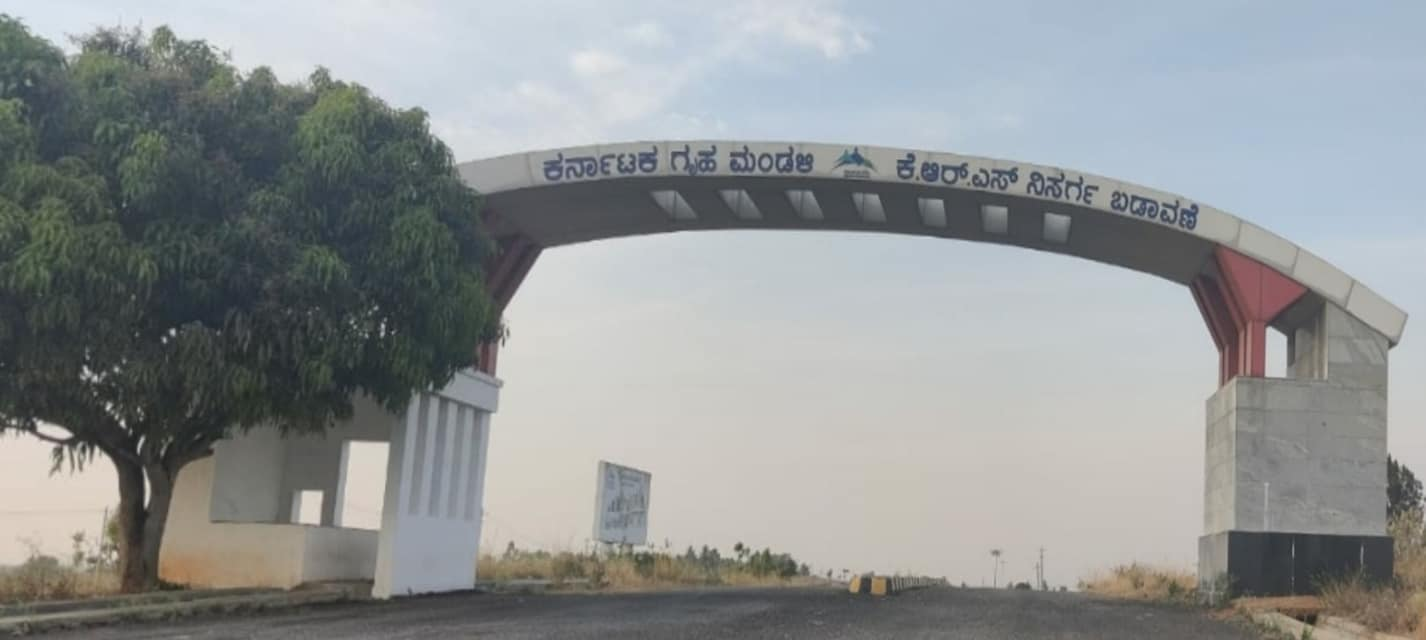
KRS Nisarga Badavane - Entrance II
