= Yelwal =

Coordinates: 12.359987°N 76.541532°E

Yelwala
- Town
- Ilavala
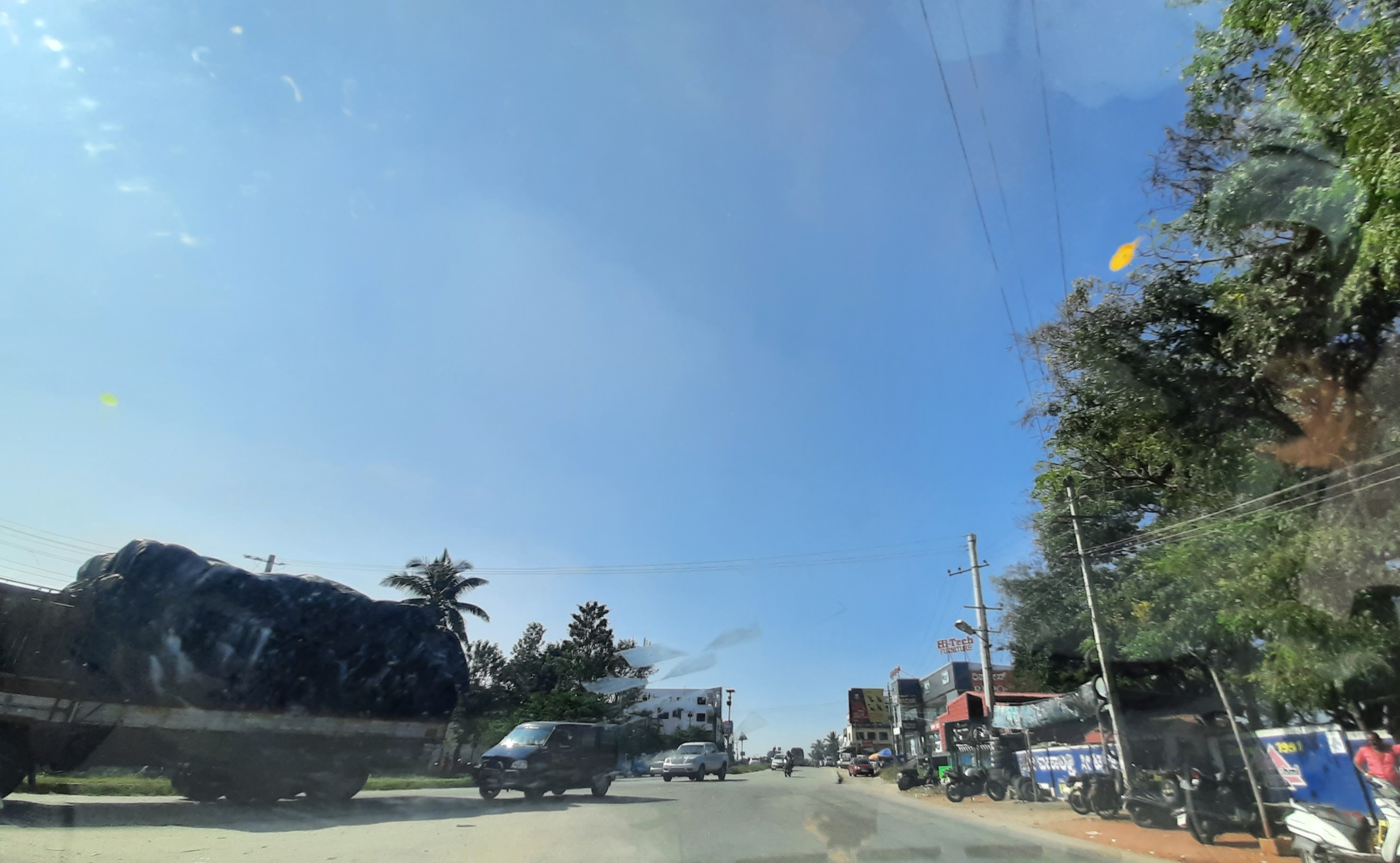
- Yelwala Town
- Interactive map of Yelwala
- Country: India

Government
  - Type: Gram Panchayat
  - Body: Ilavala Gram Panchayat

Population (2011)
  - Total: 9,826

Yelwala or Ilvaala is a Census town in the city of Mysore in Karnataka, India. This place is located between Mysore and Hunsur. Yelwala is a hobli headquarter and a Gram Panchayat. The population of Yelwala in census 2011 was 9,826.

== Location ==
Yelwala is located on Mysuru-Mangalore Highway near the city of Hootagalli, Mysuru. It is semi urbanised and is connected well with the city.

== Demographics ==
The town has population of 9,826 of which 4,940 are males while 4,886 are females. The population of children aged 0-6 is 1104 which is 11.24% of total population of Elwala (CT). In Elwala Census Town, the female sex ratio is 989 against state average of 973. Moreover the child sex ratio in Elwala is around 971 compared to Karnataka state average of 948. The literacy rate of Elwala city is 75.54% higher than the state average of 75.36%. In Elwala, male literacy is around 82.65% while the female literacy rate is 68.38%.

== Landmarks ==
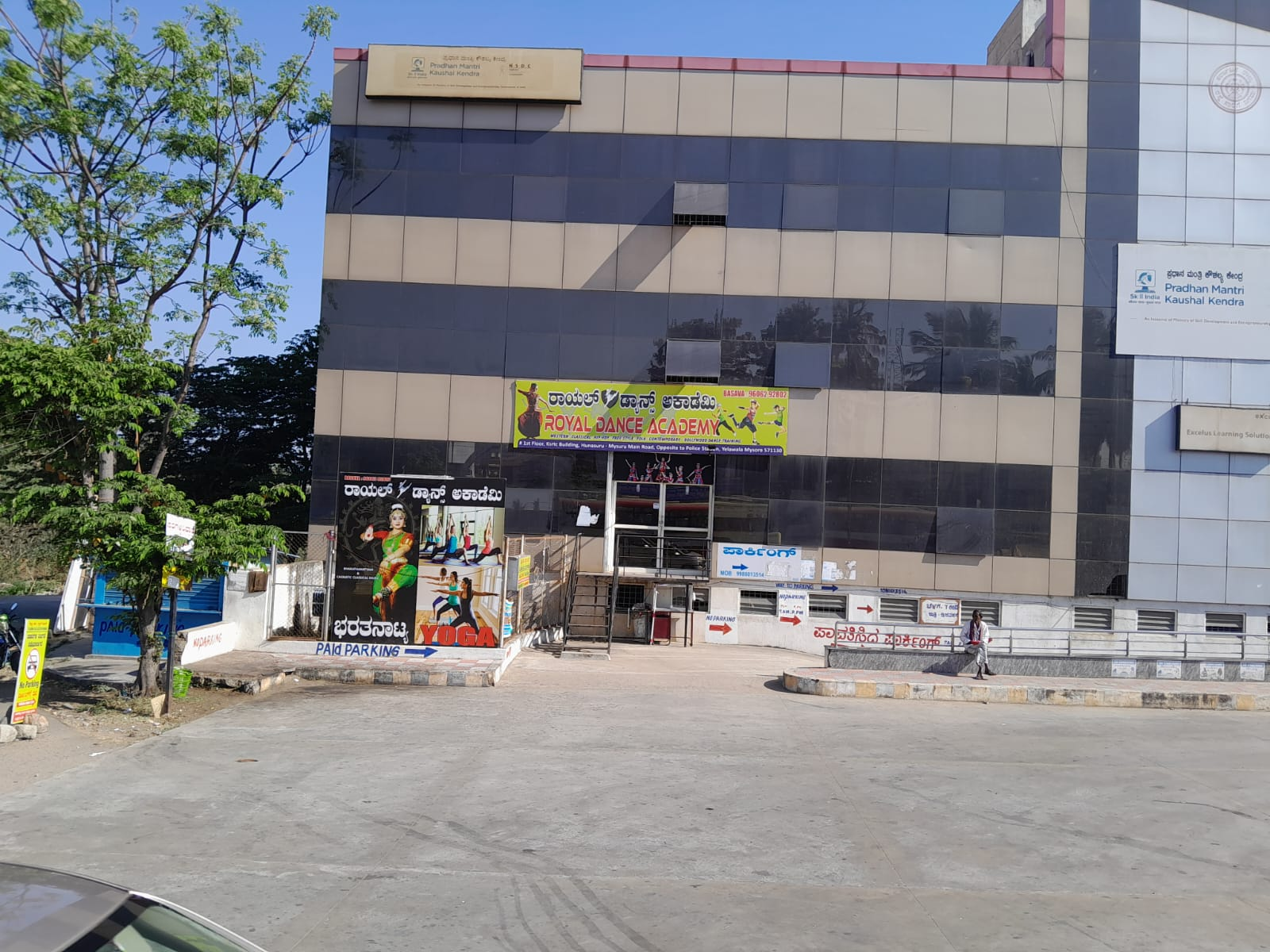
Yelwala Bus Station 2023

- Aloka Palace
- Aloka Tree Park
- St. Joseph Central School
- Sri Ramakrishna Mission
- Brahmakumaris
- Power Grid Corporation
- Yelwala Satellite Bus Stand
- Bhabha Atomic Research Centre
- Atomic Energy Central School
- Yelwala Lake

== Transport ==
Yelwala has a satellite bus stand that serves buses to Mysore City bus stand via Hootagalli. Nearest railway station is Mysore. Nearest Airport is Mysore Airport. NH275 Connecting Bangalore and Mangalore via Mysore passes through Yelwala. Yelwala-Shrirangapatna Road is another important road.

== Gallery ==
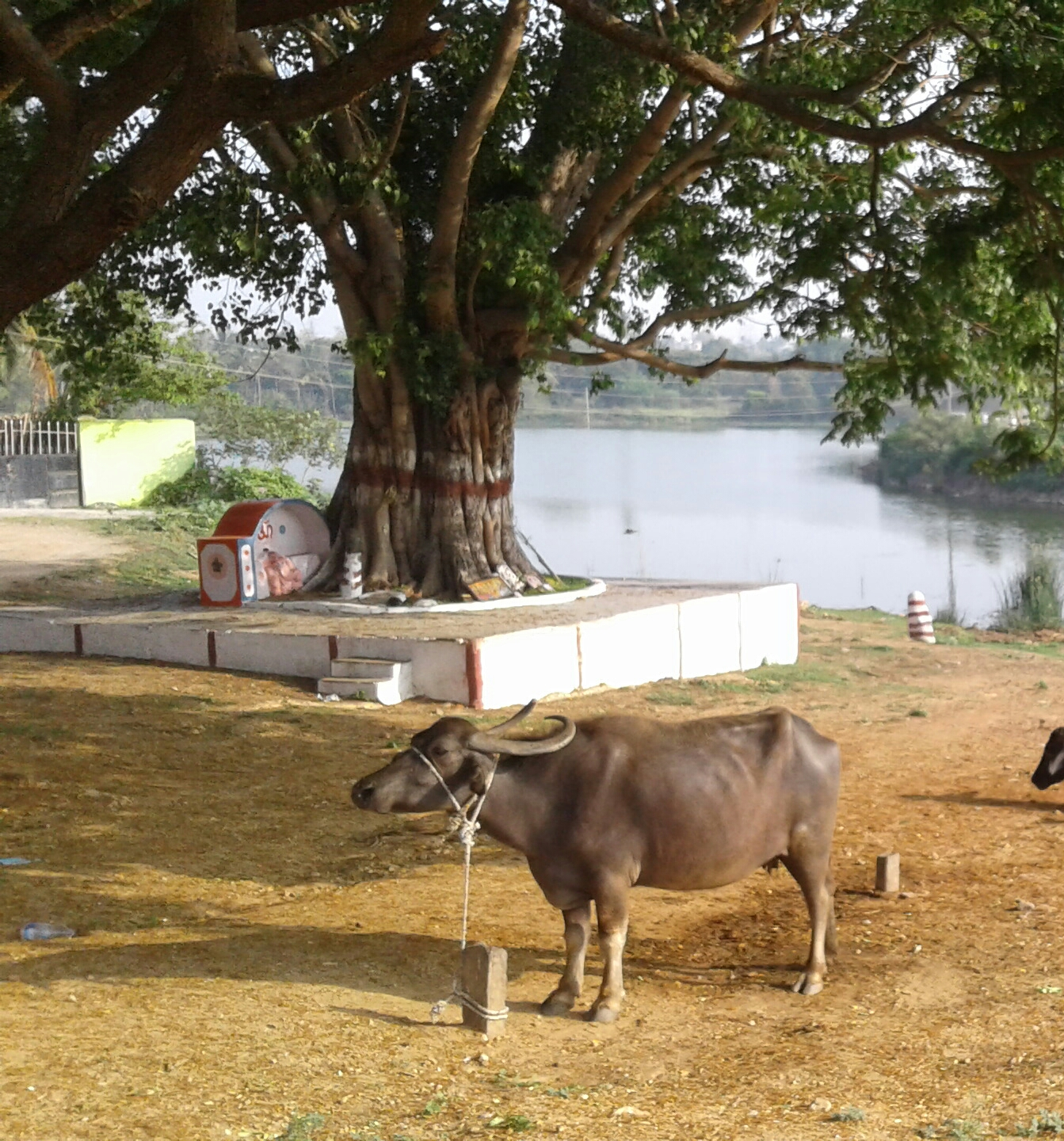

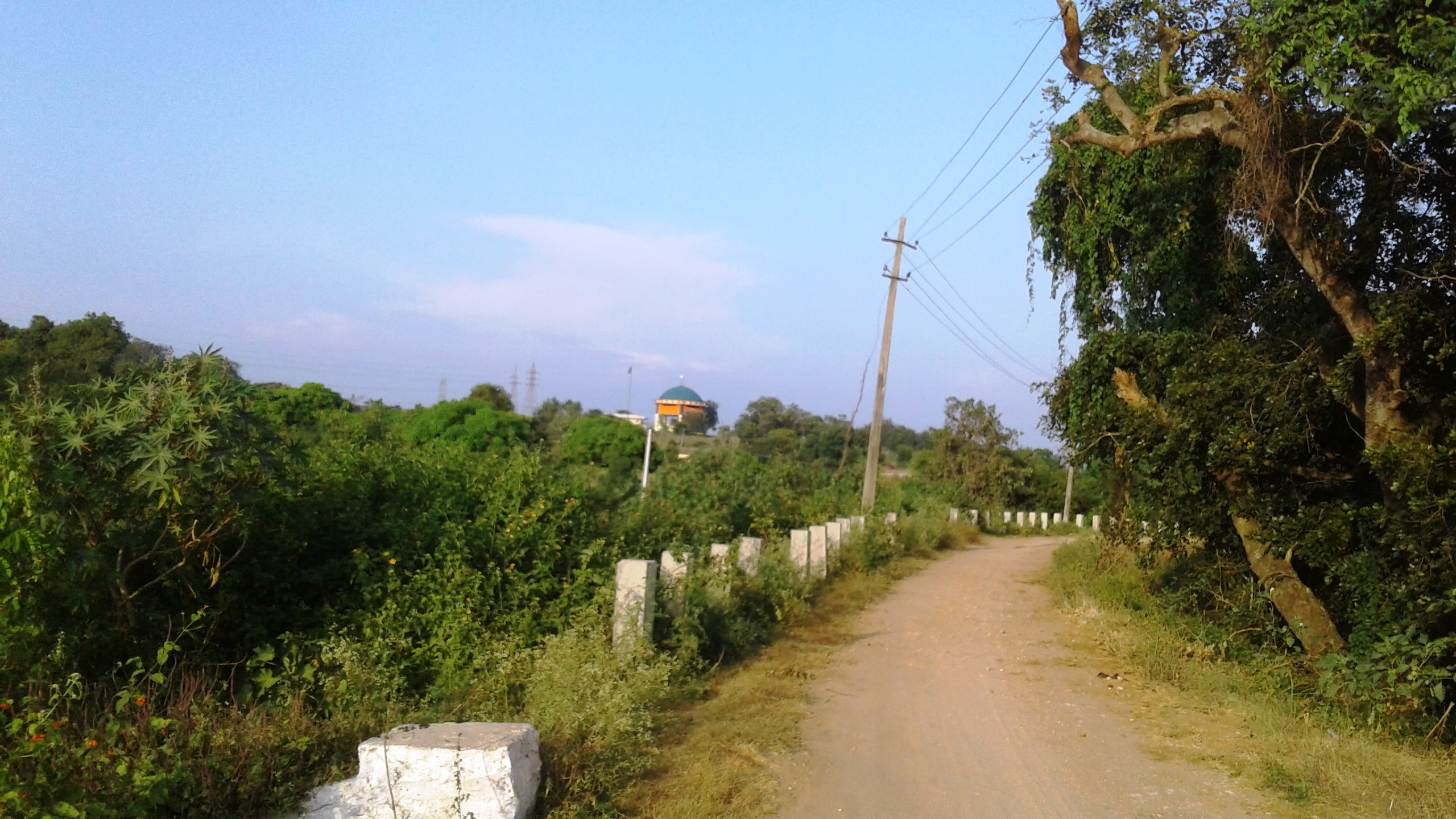

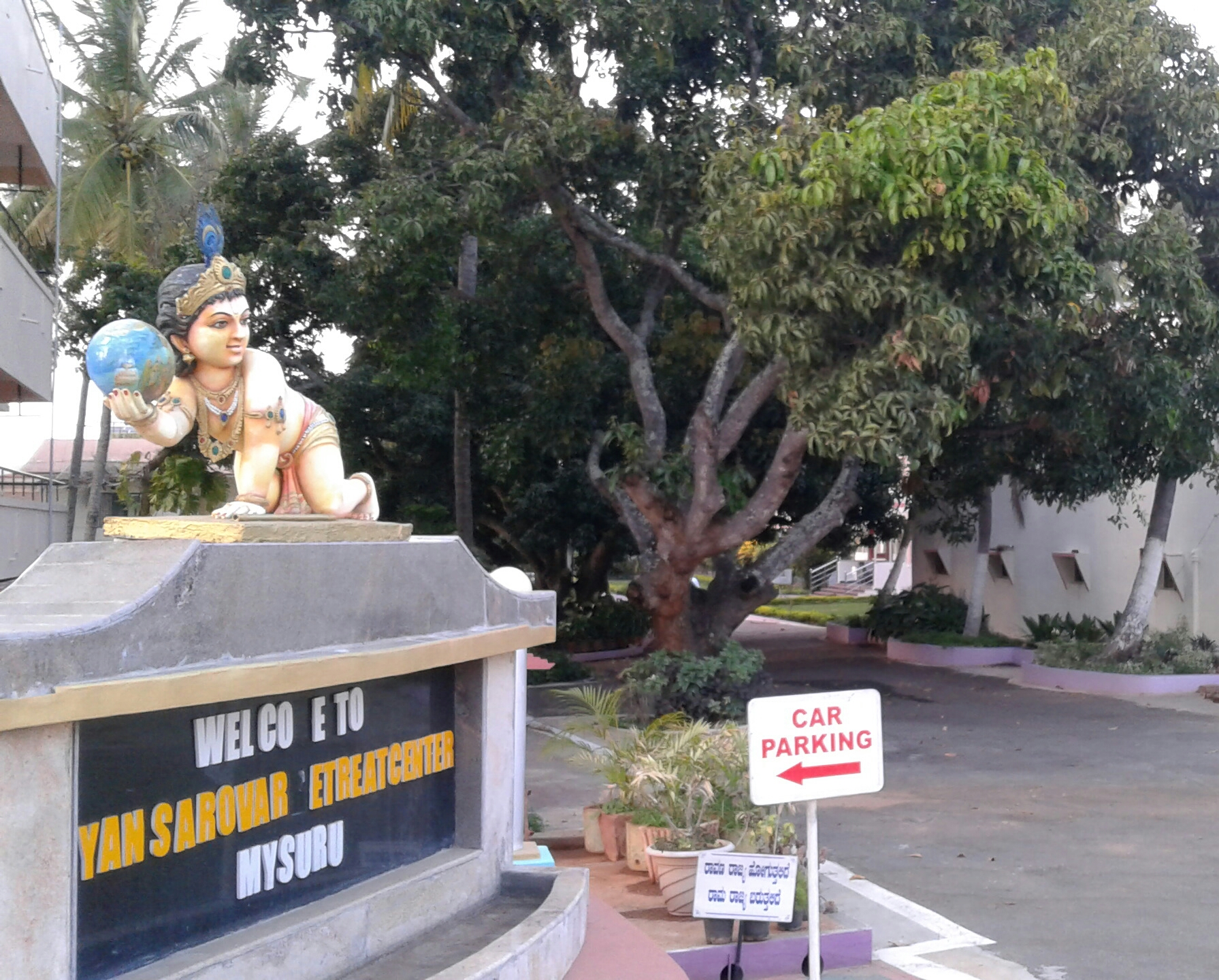

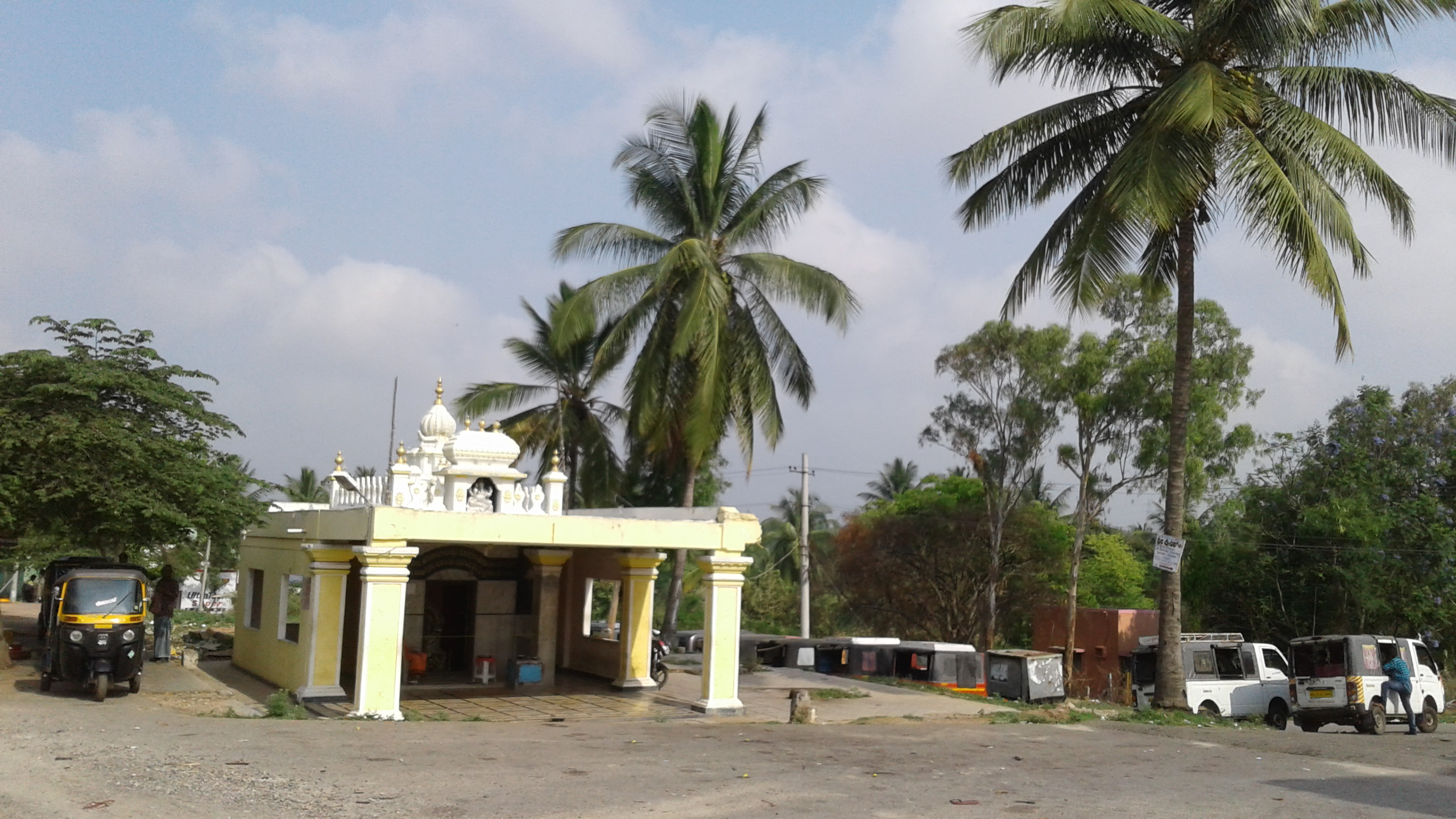

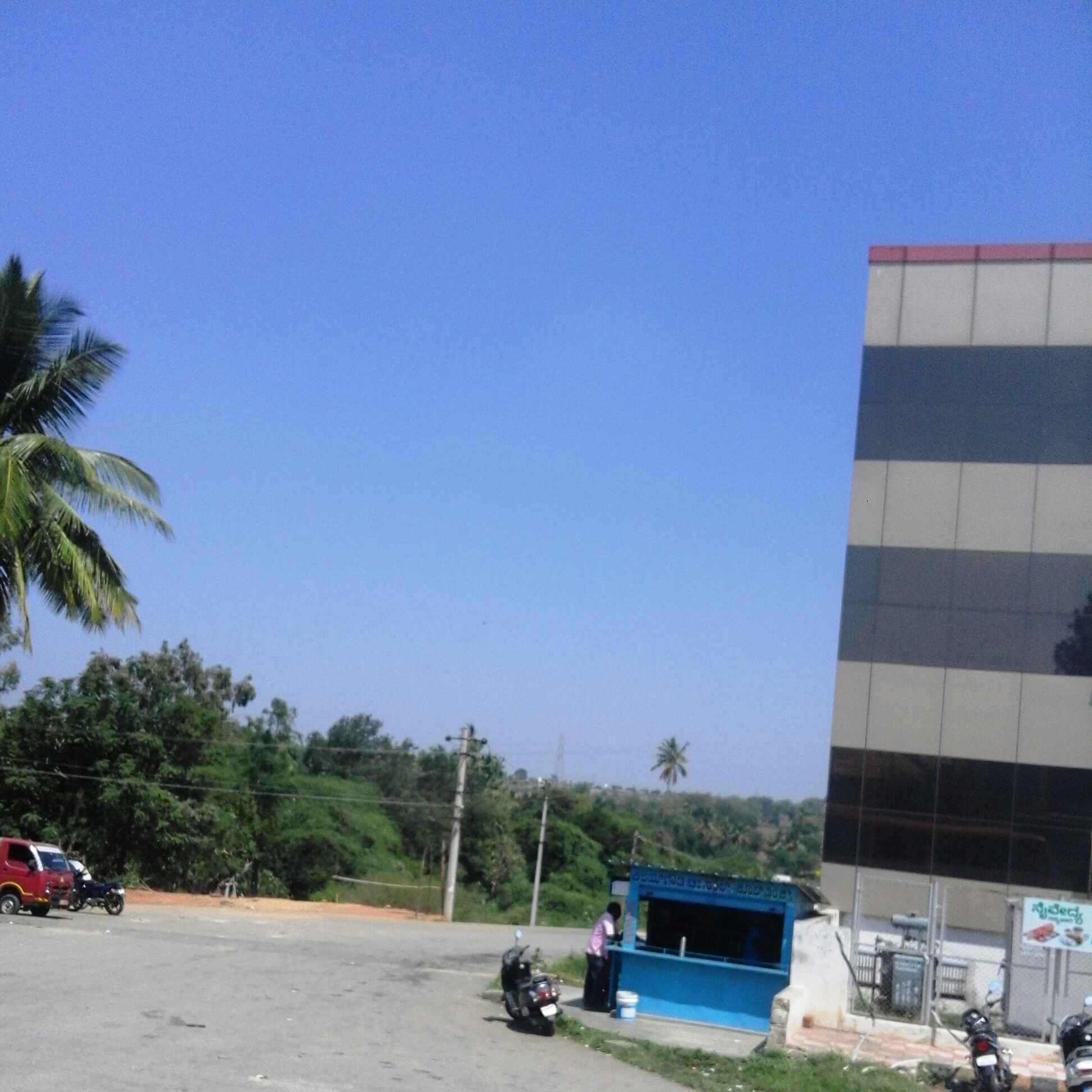

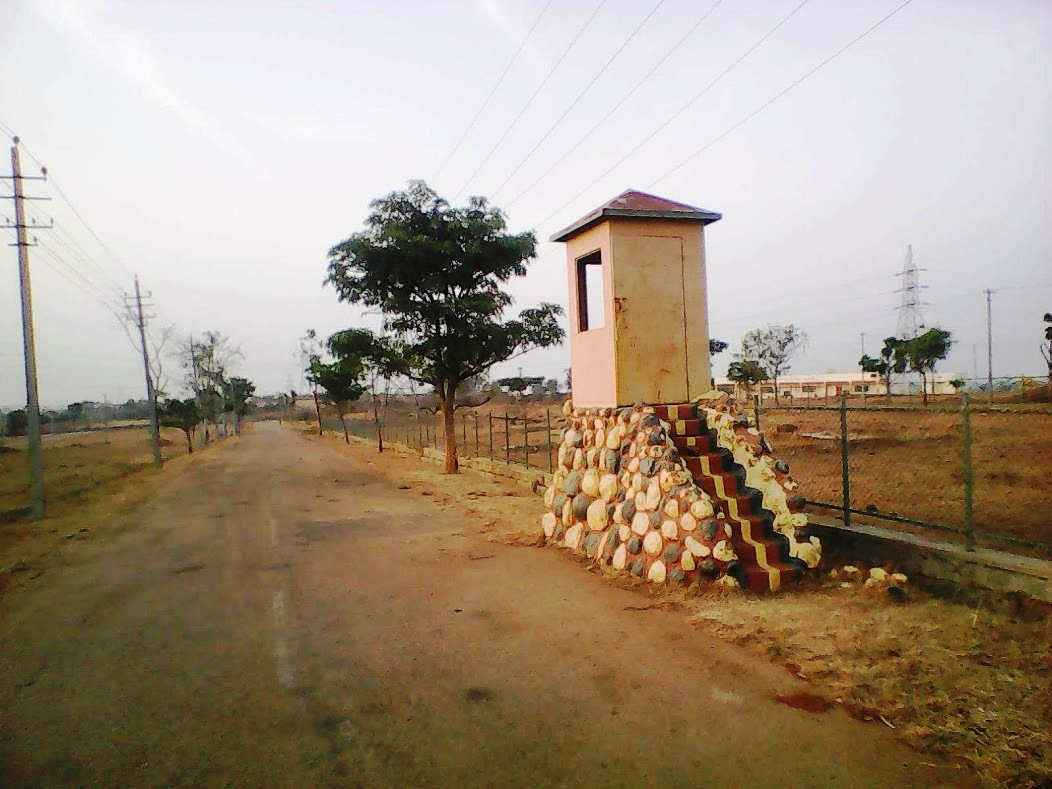

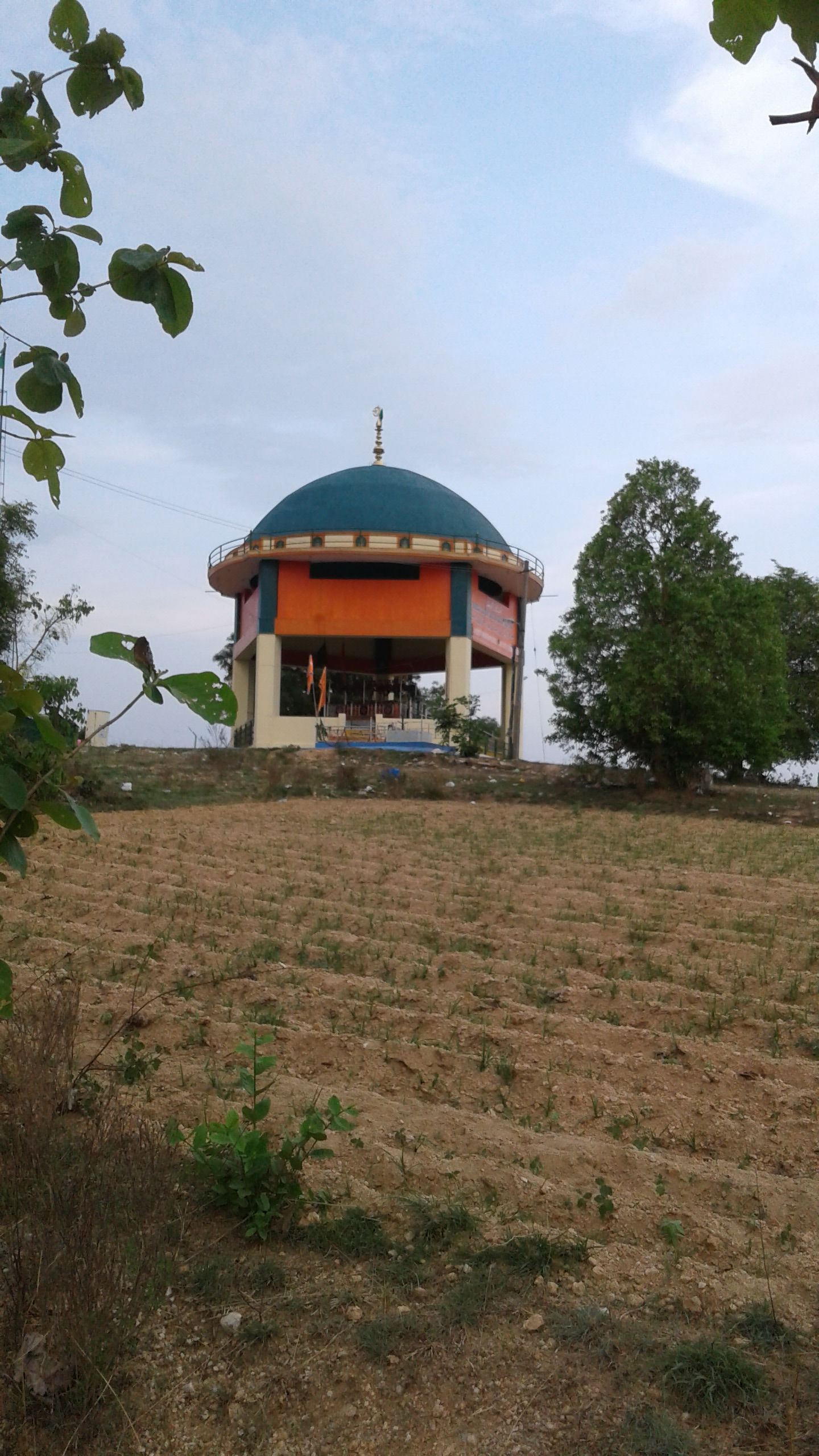

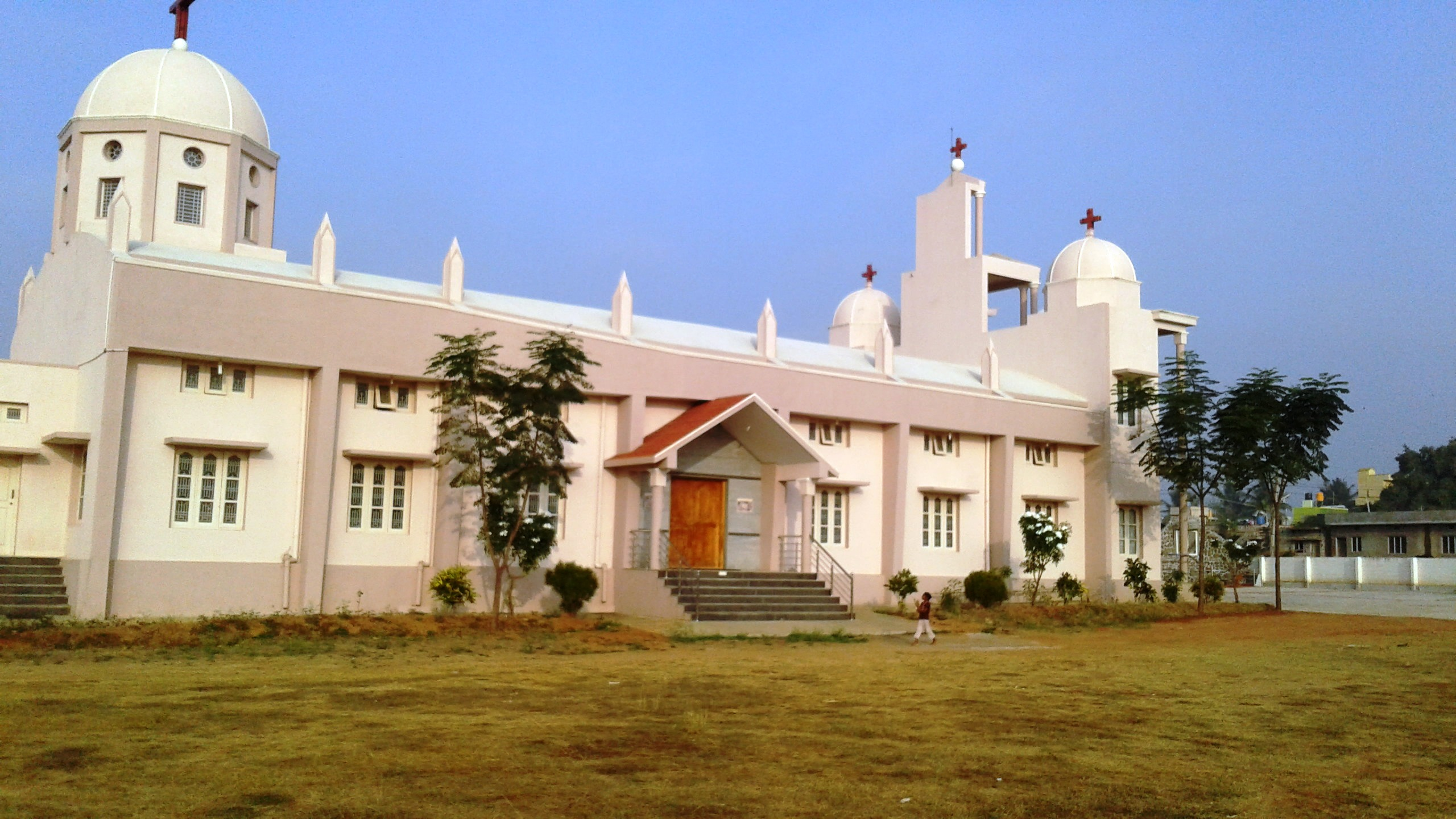

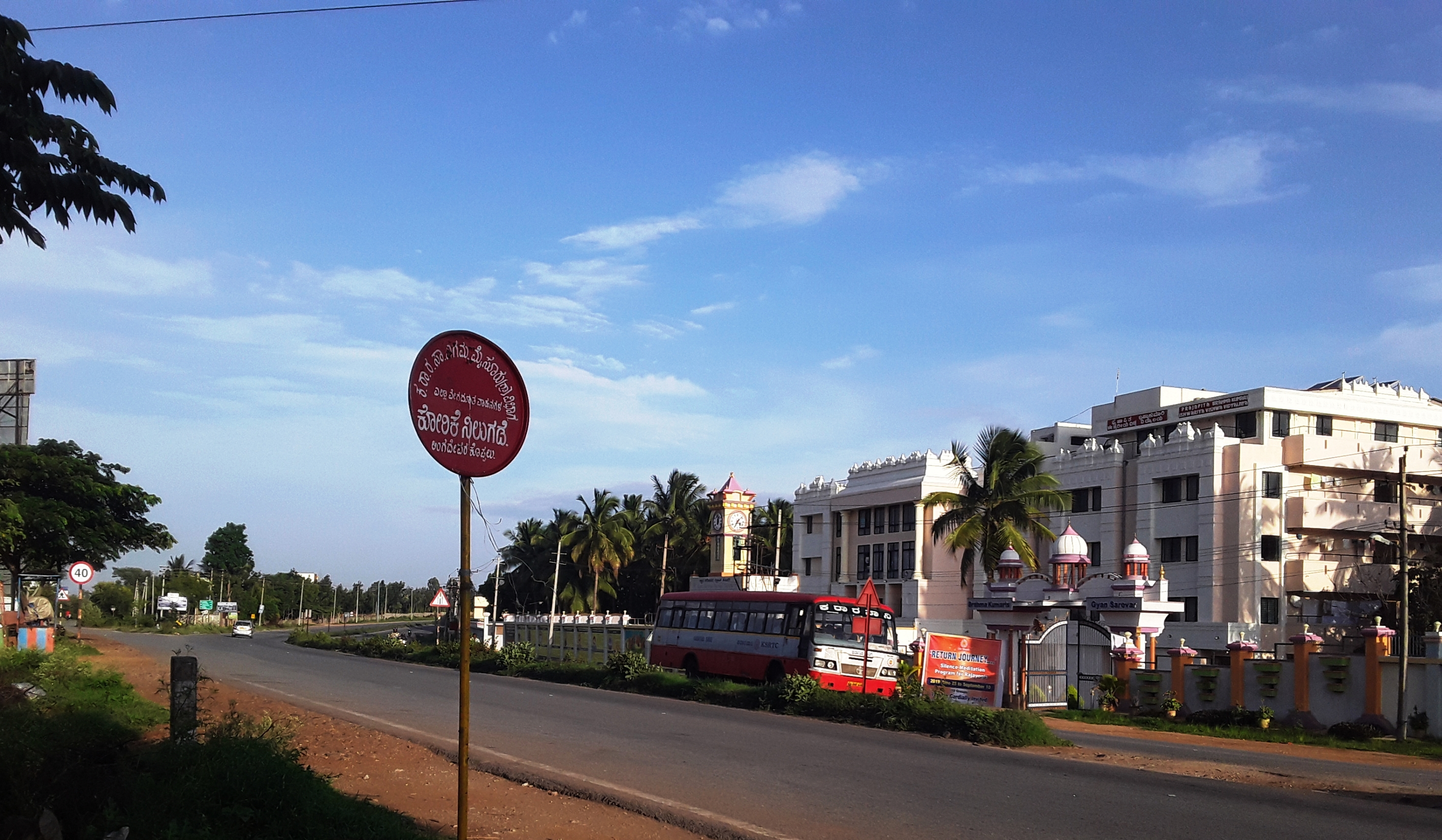

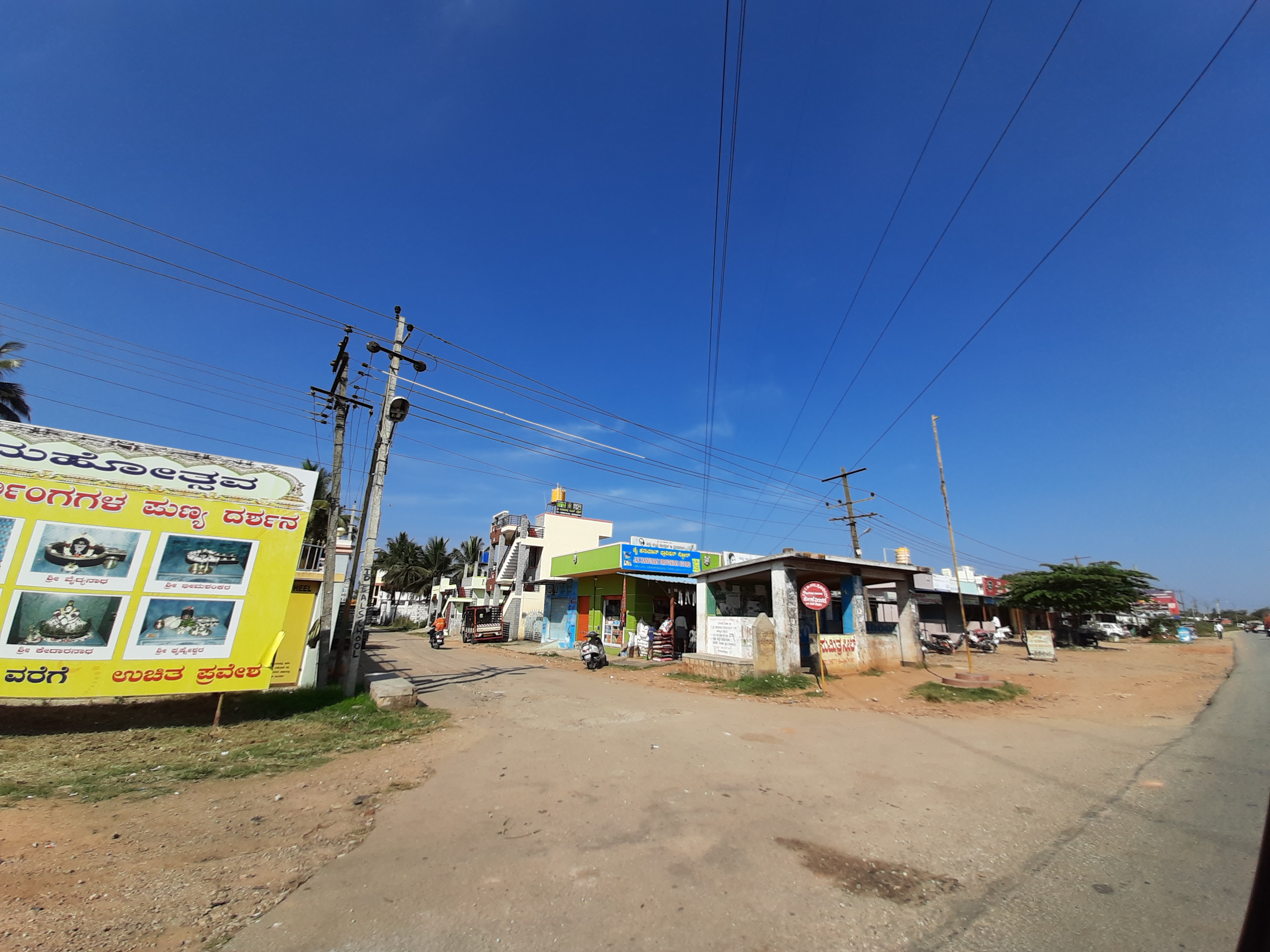

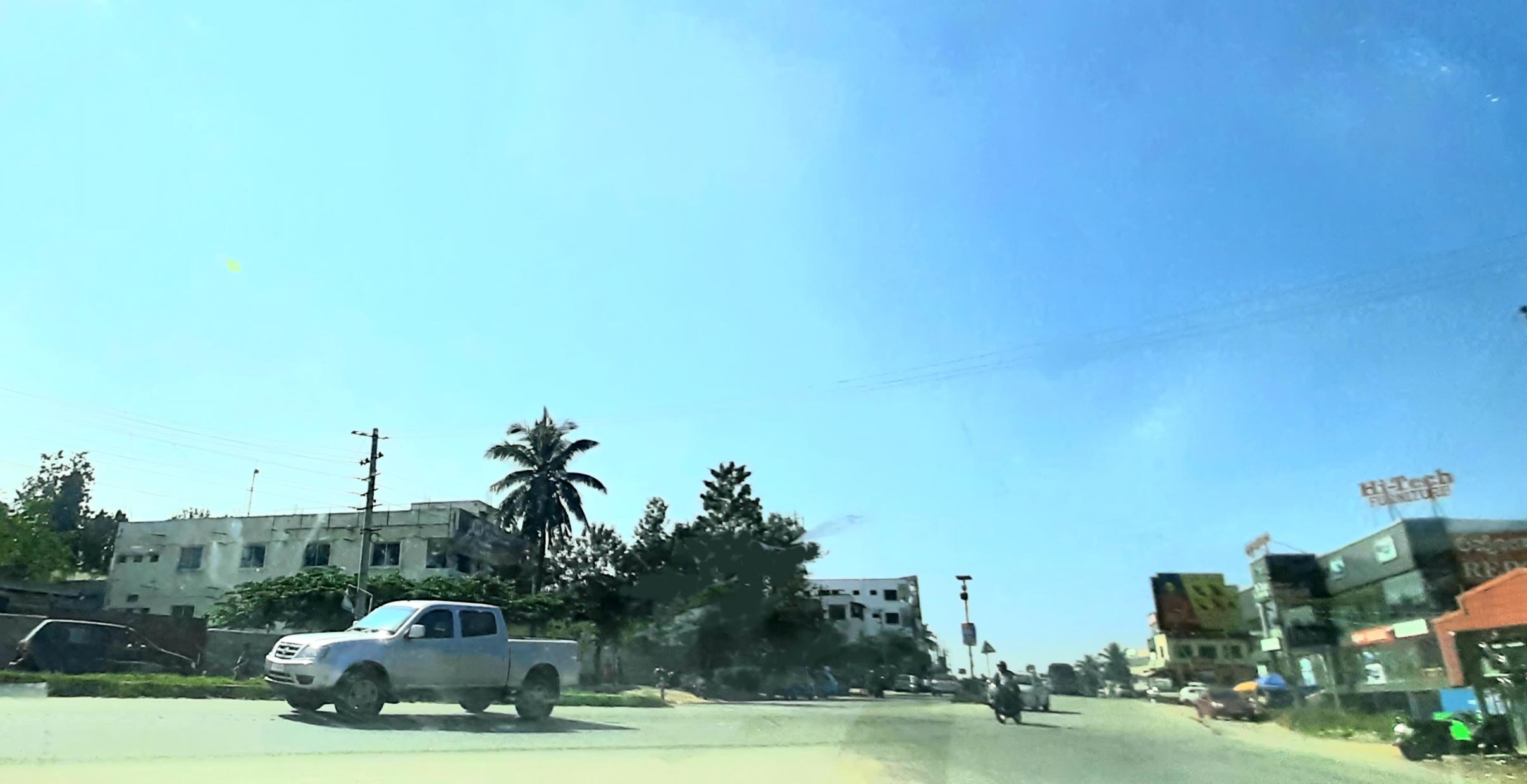

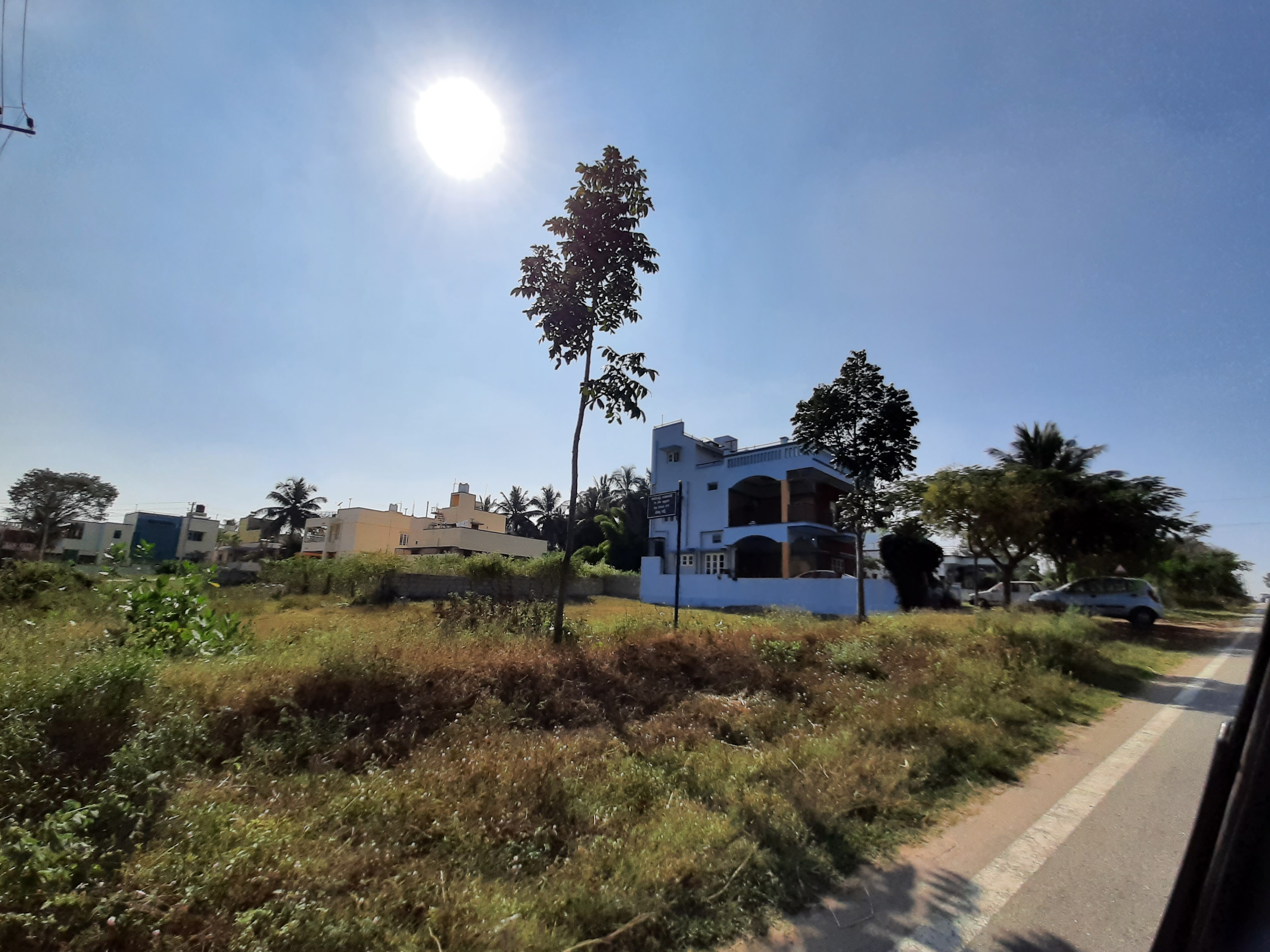
